= Liutold of Eppenstein =

- Duke of Carinthia
- Reign: 1077–1090
- Born: c. 1050
- Died: 12 May 1090
- Buried: Saint Lambert's Abbey
- Noble family: House of Eppenstein
- Father: Markwart of Eppenstein
- Mother: Liutbirg of Plain

Liutold of Eppenstein (c. 1050 – 12 May 1090) was Duke of Carinthia and Margrave of Verona from 1077 until his death.

== Biography ==
He was the second son of Markwart, Count of Eppenstein (d. 1076) and his wife Liutbirg, daughter of Count Liutold of Plain. His grandfather Adalbero of Eppenstein had already been Duke of Carinthia until he was deposed by Emperor Conrad II in 1035. Nevertheless, the Upper Styrian House of Eppenstein had remained powerful in the Carinthian lands, making it difficult for foreign rulers appointed by the emperor to prevail against the local nobility.

Liutold regained the ducal title, as his predecessor, the Zähringen duke Berthold II had supported the German antiking Rudolf of Rheinfelden during the Investiture Controversy and therefore was deposed by King Henry IV in 1077. The king, having returned from Canossa, appointed Liutold instead, who had given him safe conduct across Predil Pass and through his Carinthian possessions on his way back to Germany. The Eppenstein domains however were significantly narrowed, as Henry gave the Veronese Friuli and Istria region to the newly established Patria del Friuli (Patriarchate of Aquileia), while the Carinthian March of Styria remained under the rule of the Otakars.

Liutold later accompanied Henry IV to his coronation in Rome and also had Eppenstein Castle rebuilt. Although he had married twice, he died without issue. He was succeeded by his younger brother Henry. Liutold is buried at Saint Lambert's Abbey in Styria.

== Sources ==
- Dienst, Heide (1985). "Liutold" in Neue Deutsche Biographie (NDB) (in German). Berlin: Duncker & Humblot. p. 724. ISBN 3-428-00195-8.

Liutold of Eppenstein House of Eppenstein Born: c. 1050 Died: 12 May 1090
| Preceded by Berthold II | Duke of Carinthia; Margrave of Verona; 1077–1090 | Succeeded by Henry III |
