= Adalbero of Styria =

Adalbero (died about 1082/86), a member of the Otakar dynasty, was Margrave of Styria from 1075 until 1082.

== Biography ==
He was the eldest son of Margrave Ottokar I of Styria and his wife Willibirg of Eppenstein, possibly a daughter of Duke Adalbero of Carinthia. He succeeded as margrave upon the death of his father in 1075.

Like his father, Adalbero sided with Emperor Henry IV in the fierce Investiture Controversy, which led to a confrontation with his younger brother Ottokar II, an ally of Pope Gregory VII. In 1082 Adalbero finally was forced to resign in favour of his brother and was killed shortly afterwards.

Adalbero of Styria Otakars Died: 1082/86
Preceded by Ottokar I	Margrave of Styria; 1075–1082	Succeeded by Ottokar II
