= Henry IV of Carinthia =

Henry IV (c. 1065/70 – 14 December 1123) was Duke of Carinthia and Margrave of Verona from 1122 until his death. He was the first ruler of those territories from the Rhenish House of Sponheim.

Henry was the eldest son of Count Engelbert I of Sponheim (died 1096) and his wife, Hedwig, probably a Friulian countess from Mossa. Engelbert had been a supporter of Pope Gregory VII in the fierce Investiture Controversy and therefore had been divested of his county in the Bavarian Puster Valley by Emperor Henry IV in 1091.

After the death of his godfather, Duke Henry III of Carinthia, the last ruler from the House of Eppenstein, he was enfeoffed with the Carinthian duchy and the Veronese march by Emperor Henry V. He did, however, not inherit Henry's allodial lands, which passed to the Margrave Leopold of Styria, a member of the Traungau dynasty (Otakars). This resulted in the so-called provincia Graslupp, that is, the estates of Neumarkt and Sankt Lambrecht as well as the Murau region, which had previously belonged to the Carinthian county of Friesach, passing to the March of Styria.

Henry, like his predecessor, remained an opponent of Archbishop Conrad I of Salzburg. He died within a year of taking the rule over Carinthia and was succeeded by his younger brother, Engelbert.

== Sources ==
- Hausmann, Friedrich. "Die Grafen zu Ortenburg und ihre Vorfahren im Mannesstamm, die Spanheimer in Kärnten, Sachsen und Bayern, sowie deren Nebenlinien". Ostbairische Grenzmarken – Passauer Jahrbuch für Geschichte Kunst und Volkskunde 36 (1994): 9–62.
- Brunner, Walter. "Das Werden der Landesgrenze gegen Kärnten und Salzburg". Das Werden der Steiermark. Graz: Verlag Styria, 1980.
- Ortenburg-Tambach, Eberhard Graf zu. Geschichte des reichsständischen, herzoglichen und gräflichen Gesamthauses Ortenburg, vol. 1: Das herzogliche Haus in Kärnten. Vilshofen, 1931.

Henry IV of Carinthia House of Sponheim Born: c. 1065/70 Died: 14 December 1123
Preceded by Henry III	Duke of Carinthia; Margrave of Verona; 1122-1123	Succeeded by Engelbert
