= Ottokar I of Styria =

Ottokar I
- Margrave of Styria
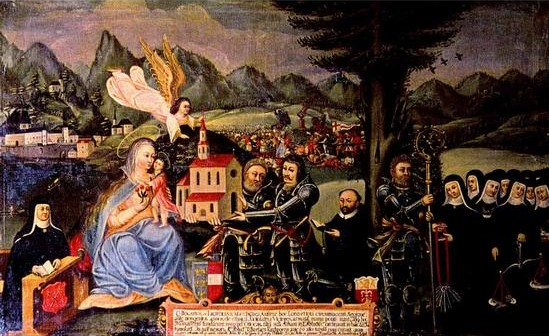
- Donor portrait of Margrave Ottokar and his sister Abbess Ata, Traunkirchen Abbey
- Died: 29 March 1075; Rome
- Noble family: Otakars
- Spouse: Willibirg of Eppenstein
- Father: Count Otakar V in the Chiemgau
- Mother: (?), Countess of Wels-Lambach

Ottokar I, also Otakar (died 29 March 1075) was count in the Bavarian Chiemgau and Margrave of Styria from 1056 until his death. He became progenitor of the dynasty of the Otakars.

== Biography ==
He was the son of Count Otakar V in the Chiemgau (died 1020) and his wife, a daughter of Count Arnold II of Wels-Lambach who had been appointed margrave upon the deposition of Duke Adalbero of Carinthia by Emperor Conrad II in 1035.

He married Willibirg of Eppenstein, possibly a daughter of Duke Adalbero of Carinthia. The later margraves Adalbero and Ottokar II were his sons. The elder Adalbero succeeded his father but fell out with his younger brother Ottokar II during the Investiture Controversy, was banned and finally murdered in 1082.

Ottokar is documented as a count in the eastern Chiemgau about 1048. By his mother he inherited extended allodial lands and the margravial title in the Traungau region around the fortress of Steyr. He also served a Vogt (reeve) of the Lambach, Traunkirchen, Obermünster, and Persenbeug monasteries and was co-founder of Admont Abbey.

From 1056, he appeared as margrave of the Carantanian march, later to be known as the March of Styria (German: Steiermark, after the town of Steyr, where Ottokar was count). In the rising Investiture Controversy he remained a loyal supporter of King Henry IV. Ottokar died in Rome, while on a pilgrimage to the Holy Land.

== Sources ==
- Brunner, Karl (1994). Herzogtümer und Marken. Vom Ungarnsturm bis ins 12. Jahrhundert (in German). Wien: Ueberreuter. pp. 907–1156. ISBN 3-8000-3532-4.

Ottokar I of Styria Otakars Died: 29 March 1075
Preceded by Arnold of Wels-Lambach	Margrave of Styria; 1056–1075	Succeeded by Adalbero
