= Burgruine Eppenstein =

Castle ruin in Styria, Austria

Coordinates: 47.131°N 14.737°E

- Eppenstein, Styria; Austria
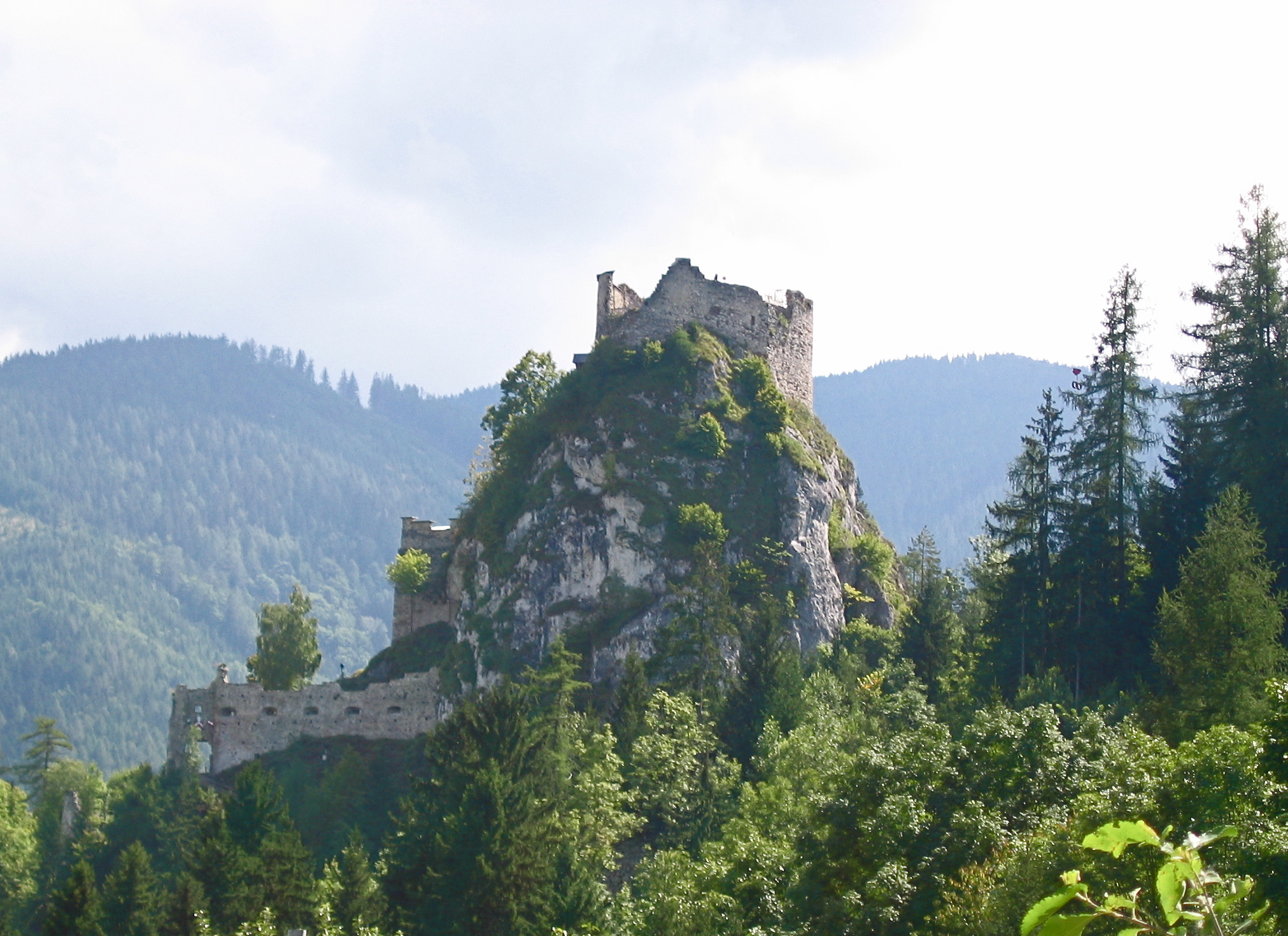

Site information
- Type: Spur castle
- Open to the public: Yes
- Condition: Ruin

Site history
- Built: c. 1000

Burgruine Eppenstein is a ruined medieval castle overlooking Eppenstein in the Austrian state of Styria. It was built about 1000 AD as the ancestral seat of the Eppenstein dynasty, whose members served as Margraves of Styria and were enfeoffed with the Duchy of Carinthia in the 11th and 12th century.

== History ==
The former spur castle is situated in the mountainous Upper Styria region, at a height of 736 metres (2,415 ft) aA. It stood above an important trade route running from the upper Mur valley across the Seetal Alps and Obdach Saddle down to the Carinthian Lavant valley.

The castrum was first mentioned in an 1160 deed, while the progenitors of the Bavarian Eppenstein family are documented as Styrian margraves since about 970. Margrave Adalbero was elevated as a Duke of Carinthia by King Henry II of Germany in 1012. When the Eppensteins became extinct upon the death of Duke Henry III of Carinthia in 1122, their allodial possessions were inherited by Margrave Ottokar II of Styria and his descendants.

Rebuilt and leased to Styrian ministeriales, the castle was seized by King Ottokar II of Bohemia who had campaigned the Styrian lands and ousted the Hungarian forces at the 1260 Battle of Kressenbrunn. Ottaker took the castle as ransom, along with two others, for the released of Herrand von Wildonie whom he held imprisoned at Veveří Castle for six months.

After Ottokar was defeated by King Rudolf I of Germany and killed in the 1278 Battle on the Marchfeld, the fortress passed through many hands over the centuries. Later held by Habsburg ministeriales like the von Graben family, it was rebuilt in a Gothic style around 1478. Rebuilt in a Gothic style and conquered by the forces of King Matthias Corvinus during the Austrian–Hungarian War in 1482, it gradually lost importance and decayed.

== See also ==
- List of castles in Austria
