= Patria del Friuli =

Constituent state of the Holy Roman Empire from 1077 to 1433

Patriarchal State of Aquileia Patria del Friuli (Italian) Patria Fori Iulii (Latin) Patrie dal Friûl (Friulian)
- 1077–1433
- Flag

- Patria del Friuli / the Patriarchal State of Aquileia (red) at the time of the Hohenstaufen Emperors (circa 1250). The pale highlighted area shows the March of Verona.
- Status: State of the Holy Roman Empire
- Capital: Aquileia; Cividale; Udine
- Official languages: Latin
- Religion: Roman Catholicism
- Government: Ecclesiastical principality
- Patriarch
  - 1068–1077: Sigehard
  - 1412–1420: Louis of Teck
- Legislature: ad hoc patriarchal councils (13th century); Parliament (14th century onwards)
- Historical era: Middle Ages
  - Duchy of Friuli incorporated into Francia as the March of Friuli: 774
  - Patriarch Sieghard of Beilstein invested with immediate comital rights: 3 April 1077
  - Territory secularised by Venice: 7 July 1420
  - Territory officially ceded to the Republic of Venice as an Imperial fief: 1433
  - Emperor Charles V renounces all Imperial feudal rights to the territory.: 1523
Preceded by	Succeeded by
March of Verona	Republic of Venice; County of Gorizia
- Today part of: Italy; Slovenia; Croatia

The Patria del Friuli (Latin: Patria Fori Iulii, Friulian: Patrie dal Friûl), also known as the Patriarchal State of Aquileia (Italian: Stato patriarcale di Aquileia), was the territory under the temporal (political) rule of the Patriarch of Aquileia, and one of the ecclesiastical states within the Holy Roman Empire. It was created in the second half of the 11th century, and existed up to the first half of the 15th century. As in the case of other ecclesiastical states, its territory was not identical with jurisdictional borders of the Patriarchate of Aquileia. In 1420, the Republic of Venice acquired and consequently annexed the territory, thus depriving the Patriarch of Aquileia of his temporal powers. Under Venetian rule, the region continued to be administered for some time under its own laws and customs.

== Foundation ==
The former Duchy of Friuli in the Italian Kingdom of the Lombards had been conquered by Charlemagne in 774 and incorporated into the Carolingian Empire. In 828, it was reorganized as the March of Friuli. In 952, King Otto I of Germany invaded Italy and added the Friulian territory to the March of Verona, ruled by the Dukes of Bavaria, and from 976 by the Dukes of Carinthia.

During the Investiture Controversy of 1077, King Henry IV of Germany deposed the Veronese margrave Berthold II, Duke of Carinthia, as he had sided with antiking Rudolf of Rheinfelden. On 3 April 1077 at Pavia Henry, on his way back from the Walk to Canossa, vested Aquileian Patriarch Sieghard of Beilstein with immediate comital rights in the Friulian lands, raising him to the status of a Prince-Bishop. The remaining parts of the March of Verona passed with the Carinthian duchy to Henry's vassal Liutold of Eppenstein.

Sieghard in turn safely conducted the king across the Alps. Back in Germany, King Henry in addition nominally assigned the suzerainty over the marches of Carniola and Istria to the patriarchs as ecclesiastical Princes of the Holy Roman Empire. The act, traditionally regarded as the birth of the ecclesiastical state of Aquileia, led to a long-running conflict with the rivaling margraves from the Carinthian House of Sponheim and the Andechs dukes of Merania.

== Expansion ==
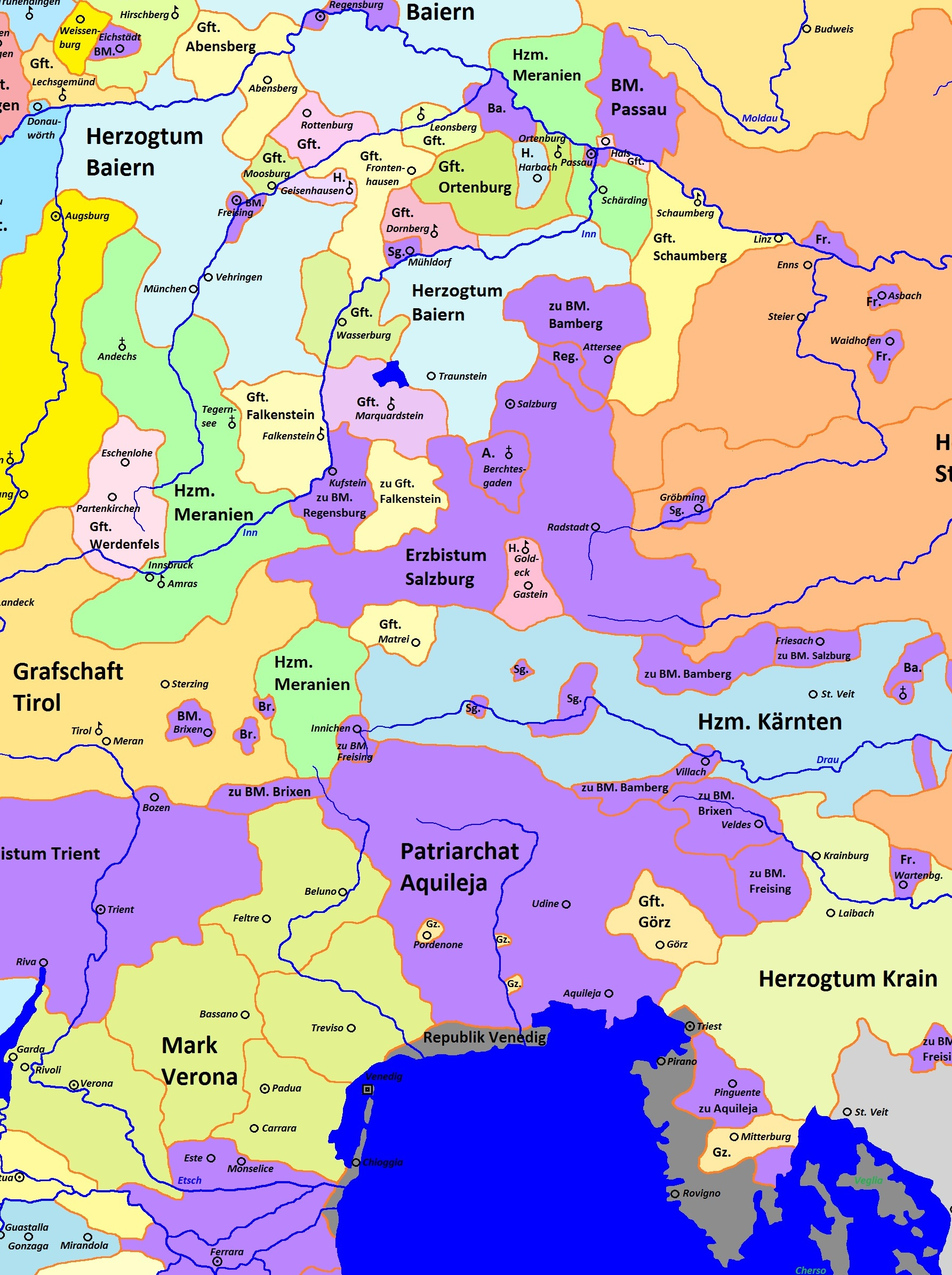
Patriarchal State of Aquileia, and neighboring feudal states in the 13th century

The Aquileian patriarchs subsequently extended their political control in the area: regions under Aquileian control in the following centuries included the Friulian lands up to Cadore, the city of Trieste and the central parts of the Istrian peninsula. At its maximum height, the Patriarchal State of Aquileia was one of the largest polities in Italy. Noblemen from the Patriarchal State were participants in the Crusades. In 1186 Patriarch Godfrey crowned Frederick Barbarossa's son, Henry VI, as King of Italy: in retaliation, Pope Urban III deposed him.

From 1127 the vogts at Gorizia from the Meinhardiner dynasty emerged from Aquileia, calling themselves Counts of Görz. Their autonomy was strengthened, when they inherited the Imperial County of Tyrol in 1253 and were elevated to Princes of the Holy Roman Empire by Emperor Charles IV in 1365.

In the early 13th century, particularly under Volchero (1204–1218) and Berthold (1218–1251), the Patriarchal State had a flourishing economy and cultural life, supported by a good road network. Damaged by earthquakes and other calamities, and reduced to a few hundred inhabitants, Aquileia was nearly abandoned in the 14th century. The capital of the state was moved first to Cividale and then, from 1238, to Udine in central Friuli, which had been a favourite residence of the patriarch since the 13th century and soon became a large city.

== Rivalry with Venice ==
The patriarchs had regained the rule of the Istrian march from the Dukes of Merania in 1209. However, they had to cope with the rising naval power of the Republic of Venice: in the late 13th century it had occupied the western Istrian coast from Capodistria (Koper) down to Rovigno (Rovinj). In 1291 a peace was made in Treviso, whereupon the western coast of the peninsula fell to Venice. In the later centuries the Patriarchal State had to face the increasing rivalry with Venice, as well as the inner strifes between its vassals, and also became entangled in the endless wars between Guelphs and Ghibellines. In 1331 Venice also incorporated Pola (Pula) in the south. A certain recovery occurred during the rule of patriarch Bertrand (1334–1350), a successful administrator and military leader. He was killed in 1350 in a plot, at the age of ninety.

The Counts of Görz had retained some interior Istrian lands around Pazin (Mitterburg), which they bequeathed to the Austrian House of Habsburg in 1374. In view of the Venetian threat, the city of Trieste submitted to the Habsburgs in 1382.

== Fall of the Patriarchal State ==
Since the transfer of the patriarchal residence to Udine, the Venetians had never lived in peace with Aquileian patriarchs, of whose Imperial favour and tendencies they were jealous. From about 1400, Venice under the doge Michele Steno and his successor Tommaso Mocenigo began to enlarge its dogado by gradually occupying the Aquileian hinterlands. At the same time, the Patriarchal State suffered internal conflicts between the citizens of Cividale and Udine.

In 1411, those conflicts turned into a war which was to mark the end of the Patriarchal State. Cividale received support from most of the Friulian communes, the Carraresi of Padua, king Sigismund of Germany, while Udine was backed by the Venetians. In the December of that year an Imperial army captured Udine, and in January 1412 Louis of Teck was enthroned as patriarch in the city's cathedral. On 23 July 1419 the Venetians conquered Cividale, and then continued to advance further. Udine fell to Venetians on 7 June 1420 after a long siege. Soon afterwards Gemona, San Daniele, Venzone and Tolmezzo followed. In the same time, Aquileian possessions in Istria, including Muggia, Labin and Plomin, surrendered to Venice in 1420.

Thus, the core territories of the Patriarchal State were captured by the Venetians, and the temporal authority of the patriarch was lost on 7 July 1420 when its territories were secularised by Venice. The former Patriarchal State was thus incorporated into the Venetian Republic with the name of Patria del Friuli, and ruled by a General Proveditor or a Luogotenente residing in Udine. Unwilling to accept such outcome, patriarch Louis of Teck retreated to Cilli, refusing to recognize Venetian annexation of his lands. In April 1422, he attempted to invade Friuli, but was pushed back by the Venetians. Another attempt was repeated in September of the same year, but also failed. Louis' final attempt was repelled in 1431 by the Venetians.

In 1433, Venetian doge Francesco Foscari signed an agreement with emperor Sigismund, whereby the Empire ceded the Domini di Terraferma, stretching from the Adriatic Sea to the Alps, to the Republic, then officially as an Imperial fief. The territory around Gorizia and Aquileia proper was retained by the Counts of Görz; the last Count Leonhard in 1500 bequeathed his lands to Archduke Maximilian I of Austria, who also annexed the city of Gradisca in 1511. The former Görz territories were incorporated into the Inner Austrian possessions of the Habsburgs.

In 1445, after new patriarch Ludovico Trevisan at the Council of Florence had acquiesced in the loss of his ancient temporal estate in return for an annual salary of 5,000 ducats allowed him from the Venetian treasury, the conflict could be considered as finally over. Henceforth only Venetians were allowed to hold the office of the Patriarch of Aquileia.

In 1469, the Emperor Frederick III confirmed Venetian possessions in Friuli, and in 1523 emperor Charles V ultimately renounced any Imperial feudal rights to the territories of the former Patriarchal State of Aquileia.

== Parliament ==
The Friulian parliament evolved out of ad hoc patriarchal councils of increasingly greater size, convoked in the 13th century to obtain the financial and military support of the Friulian barons in the near continual wars of patriarchs with their neighbours. By the century's end, the institution had become regularized and in the early 14th century it spoke of itself as acting "in the name of the whole population of Friuli" (nomine totius universitatis Foriiulii). During the entire period of patriarchal rule the parliament's primary function was military. Barons, ecclesiastics and towns participated according to their military responsibilities as listed in the talea militiae. These responsibilities were fixed and periodically changed by the parliament. The patriarchal demesne itself owed service according to the talea. The patriarch's chief influence over the parliament lay in his appointment of gastalds in the towns, by which means he could influence the choice of representatives the towns sent to parliament.

The parliament met up to ten times a year, and was especially important during vacancies in the patriarchal office, which were frequent. Plenary sessions never lasted more than one day, and the main work of the parliament was done by committees (consigli, singular consiglio), of which just two were regular. The first was composed of sixteen men—two churchmen, two barons, eight ministeriales and four representatives of the towns—and any appointees the patriarch chose. This committee met for one or two days immediately after a plenary session to apply its decisions. The second committee consisted of three representatives each from the three estates of the realm elected by the plenary session and six appointees of the patriarch. The patriarch was eventually restricted in his selections to the members of parliament. This second committee sat for six months, becoming in essence a permanent committee.

The parliament had original jurisdiction in cases of feudal law, conspiracy and rebellion, and in civil actions against the patriarch. It was also the court of last resort in almost all cases. In March 1355 the parliament codified a constitution for Friuli, the Constitutiones Patriae Foriiulii. This was amended in 1366, 1368 and 1380 and confirmed by Venice in 1429. It remained the fundamental law of the Patria del Friuli until the fall of Venice in 1797.

The parliament cooperated with the patriarch in treating with foreign powers, but it had no role in the Venetian conquest and incorporation of Friuli into the Domini di Terraferma in 1420. Nonetheless, it continued to function in the same relation to a lieutenant (luogotenente) appointed by the Venetian Senate as it had had with the patriarch. Udine and Cividale ceased to participate and the parliament was divided into two assemblies for the regions east and west of the Tagliamento. In the mid-16th century, a separate body—the corpo della contadinanza—representing the rural districts was created. A 16th-century antiquary, Count Girolamo di Porcia, remarked nostalgically that Friuli under the patriarchs had "more the form of a republic than of a principality" (più a forma di repubblica che di principato).

== Sources ==
- Banić, Josip (2019). "The Venetian Takeover of the Margraviate of Istria (1411-1421): The Modality of a Passage (with Eight Previously Unedited Documents in the Appendix)". History in Flux. 1: 41–77.
- Borzacconi, Angela (2020). "Sulle tracce del Patriarcato" (PDF). Sulle tracce dello Stato Patriarcale di Aquileia. Trieste: DotArt. pp. 13–27.
- Dursteler, Eric, ed. (2013). A Companion to Venetian History, 1400-1797. Leiden-Boston: Brill.
- Luthar, Oto, ed. (2008). The Land Between: A History of Slovenia. Frankfurt am Main: Peter Lang.
- Reuter, Timothy (2013) [1991]. Germany in the Early Middle Ages c. 800–1056. London and New York: Routledge.
- Štih, Peter (2010). The Middle Ages between the Eastern Alps and the Northern Adriatic: Select Papers on Slovene Historiography and Medieval History. Leiden-Boston: Brill.
- Wickham, Chris (1981). Early Medieval Italy: Central Power and Local Society, 400-1000. Totowa, NJ: Barnes & Noble.
- Wilson, Peter (2016). Heart of Europe: A History of the Holy Roman Empire. Cambridge: Harvard University Press.
