= Ottokar II =

Ottokar II may refer to:

- Ottokar II, Margrave of Styria (died 1122)
- Ottokar II of Bohemia (c. 1230–1278), called the Iron and Golden King
