= Ottokar I =

Ottokar I may refer to:

- Ottokar I of Bohemia, king of Bohemia (1198–1230)
- Ottokar I of Styria (?–1075)
