= Conrad III of Carinthia =

Conrad III
- Duke of Carinthia
- Reign: 1056–1061
- Died: 1061
- Noble family: Ezzonids
- Spouse: Judith of Bohemia
- Father: Hezzelin of Zülpich

Conrad III (died 1061), a member of the Ezzonid dynasty, was Duke of Carinthia and Margrave of Verona from 1056 until his death.

== Life ==
He was son of Hezzelin I, count in the Zülpichgau, and brother of Count palatine Henry I of Lotharingia. His mother possibly was a daughter of the late Salian duke Conrad I of Carinthia.

In 1055 he had joined the rebellion of his Ezzonid cousin Duke Conrad I of Bavaria and Duke Welf of Carinthia against Emperor Henry III. Nevertheless, upon Henry's death in 1056, he was pardoned by his widow Agnes of Poitou and enfeoffed with the Carinthian duchy. Conrad, however, did not succeed in imposing his authority on the powerful native aristocracy. He died five years later, having possibly never entered Carinthia. He was succeeded by the Zähringen duke Berthold II.

== Sources ==
- Jackman, Donald C. (2012). The Kleeberg Fragment of the Gleiberg County. Editions Enplage.
- Robinson, I. S. (1999). Henry IV of Germany 1056-1106. Cambridge University Press.

Conrad III of Carinthia Ezzonids Died: 1061
Preceded by Welf	Duke of Carinthia; Margrave of Verona; 1055–1061	Succeeded by Berthold II
