= Berthold II of Carinthia =

Duke of Carinthia from 1061 to 1077

Berthold II
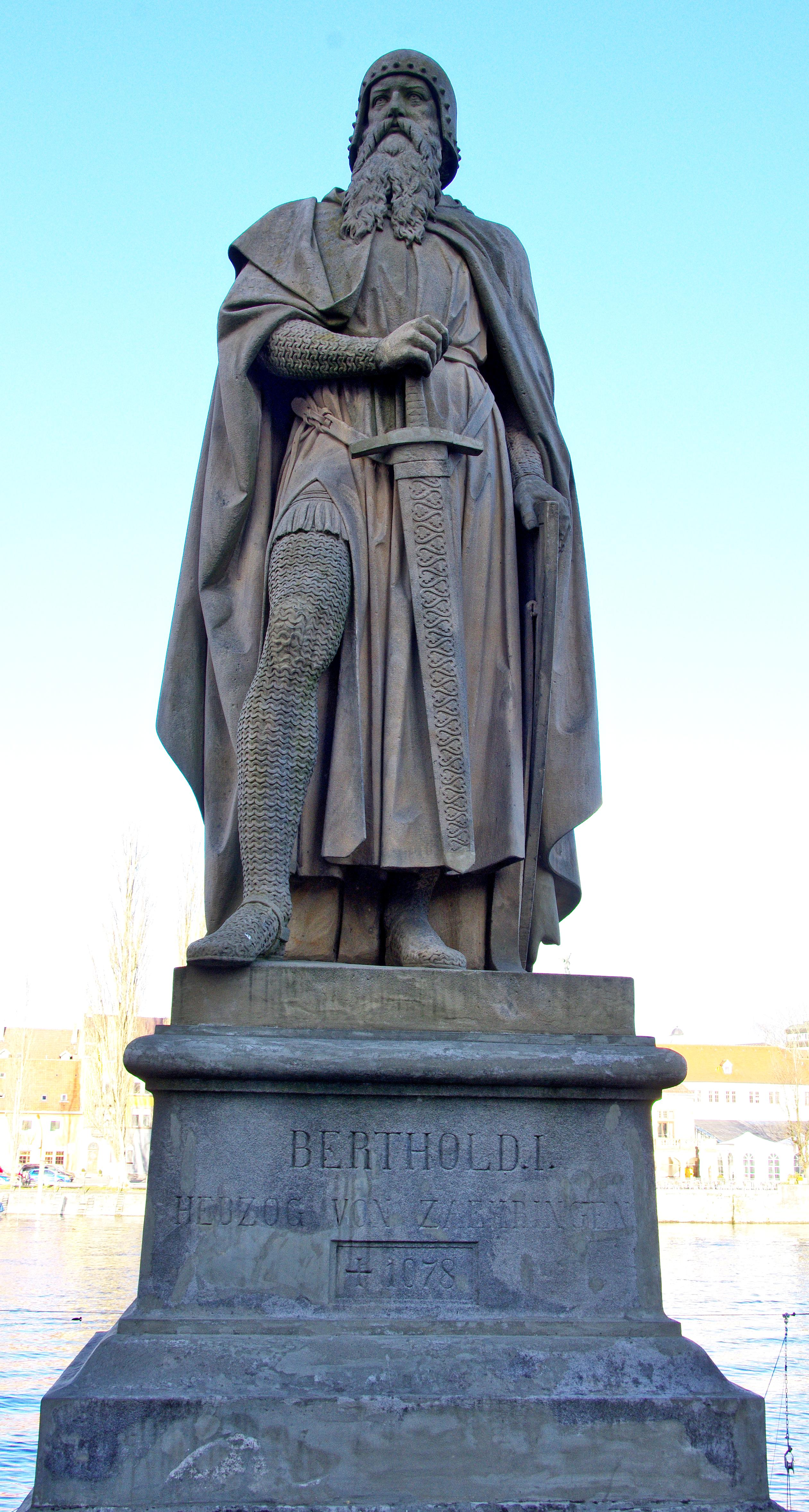
- 19th-century statue of Berthold in Constance

Duke of Carinthia
- Reign: 1061–1077
- Predecessor: Conrad III
- Successor: Liutold
- Born: c. 1000
- Died: 6 November 1078; Limburg Castle, Weilheim, Swabia
- Buried: Hirsau Abbey
- Noble family: House of Zähringen
- Spouses: Richwara of Kärnten; Beatrice of Montbéliard
- Issue: Herman I of Baden; Berthold II of Zähringen; Gebhard III of Constance

Berthold (c. 1000 – 6 November 1078), duke of Carinthia, was the founder of the Swabian House of Zähringen. From 1061 until 1077, he was the Duke of Carinthia and Margrave of Verona.

== Life ==
Berthold quickly rose to be one of the most powerful counts in Swabia, and the Salian emperor Henry III even promised his party-follower the title of Duke of Swabia, then held by Otto of Schweinfurt. However, upon Otto's death in 1057, Henry's widow Agnes of Poitou gave the Duchy of Swabia in fief to Count Rudolf of Rheinfelden. Berthold received, as compensation for the abandonment of his claim, the Duchy of Carinthia and the March of Verona, after the death of the Ezzonid duke Conrad III in 1061.

Berthold was the only Carinthian duke from the Zähringer dynasty. Both in Carinthia and Verona, like his Ezzonid predecessor, he was considered a foreign ruler and was never really accepted by the local nobles. According to a contemporary chronicler, Lambert of Hersfeld, he was even temporarily declared deposed in 1072/1073.

Moreover, Berthold had a falling out with King Henry IV during the fierce Investiture Controversy when, together with Duke Welf I of Bavaria, he supported the election of his former rival Rudolf of Rheinfelden as antiking, after King Henry's Walk to Canossa in 1077. In turn, the king convened the Imperial Diet at Ulm, where he seized the duchy and gave Carinthia to Liutold of Eppenstein, whose grandfather Adalbero had held it until 1035.

Berthold then retired to his Swabian home territory, where he had to ward off constant attacks by King Henry's forces. He died in 1078 at Limburg Castle and was buried in Hirsau Abbey, where he had backed the construction of the monastery church under Abbot William.

== Marriages and children ==
Berthold and his first wife, Richwara, had the following children:

- Herman I (c. 1040 – 1074), who used the Veronese margravial title and founded the line of the margraves of Baden
- Berthold II (c. 1050 – 1111), who was Duke of Swabia in opposition to Frederick of Hohenstaufen from 1092 to 1098, then Duke of Zähringen
- Gebhard (c. 1050 – 1110), who was Bishop of Constance from 1084
- Liutgard (d. about 1119), who married the Nordgau margrave Diepold of Vohburg
- Richinza, who married Count Rudolf of Frickingen, then secondly married Louis of Sigmaringen, a relative of the House of Helfenstein

In his second marriage, Berthold was married to Beatrice of Montbéliard, a daughter of Count Louis of Montbéliard and his wife Sophie, Countess of Bar.

== Legacy ==
In the end, the Zähringer were able to maintain their position, and around 1098, Berthold's son Berthold II reached an agreement with the Hohenstaufen duke Frederick I of Swabia, retaining the title of "Duke of Zähringen". From 1112, Herman II, son of Herman I, ruled as margrave of Baden.

== Sources ==
- Barraclough, Geoffrey, ed. (1961). Medieval Germany, 911-1250. Vol. II:Essays. Basil Blackwell.
- Beach, Alison I.; Sutherland, Samuel S.; Li, Shannon M. T., eds. (2020). Monastic Experience in Twelfth-century Germany: The Chronicle of Petershausen in Translation. Manchester University Press. ISBN 9781526143297.
- Fautrier, Pascale (2018). Hildegarde de Bingen: Un secret de naissance (in French). Albin Michel. ISBN 9782226431981.
- Robinson, I.S. (1999). Henry IV of Germany 1056-1106. Cambridge University Press.
- Robinson, I.S. (2013). Eleventh-century Germany: The Swabian Chronicles. Manchester University Press. ISBN 9781526112828.
- Völkl, Martin (2010). "Germany: Narrative (1024-1125)". In Rogers, Clifford J. (ed.). The Oxford Encyclopedia of Medieval Warfare and Military Techinology. Vol. 2. Oxford University Press. pp. 171–176. ISBN 978-0-19-533403-6.

Berthold II of Carinthia House of Zähringen Born: c. 1000 Died: 6 November 1078
Preceded by Conrad III	Duke of Carinthia; Margrave of Verona; 1061–1077	Succeeded by Liutold
