= Henry of Eppenstein =

Duke of Carinthia and Margrave of Verona (died 1122)

- Duke of Carinthia
- Duke: 1090–1122
- Predecessor: Liutold of Eppenstein
- Successor: Henry of Sponheim
- Born: c. 1050
- Died: 4 December 1122
- Noble family: House of Eppenstein
- Spouses: Sophia Babenburg von Österreich, daughter of Leopold II, Margrave of Austria
- Father: Markwart of Eppenstein
- Mother: Liutbirg of Plain

Henry of Eppenstein (usually numbered Henry III; c. 1050 – 4 December 1122) was Duke of Carinthia and Margrave of Verona from 1090 to 1122. He was the last duke from the House of Eppenstein.

He was the son of Count Markwart of Eppenstein (d. 1076) and his wife Liutbirg of Plain, and he was the younger brother of Liutold of Eppenstein, who was enfeoffed with the Carinthian duchy after the deposition of the Zähringen duke Berthold by King Henry IV of Germany in 1077. Both brothers had been loyal allies of the king during the fierce Investiture Controversy and the Walk to Canossa. When the princes elected Rudolf of Rheinfelden anti-king, the Eppensteins ensured King Henry's safe passage back to Germany.

In or shortly after 1077, Henry IV granted the marches of Carniola and Istria to Henry of Eppenstein. When Duke Liutold died childless in 1090, Henry IV vested him with Carinthia and the Veronese march, but transferred Carniola to the Patriarchate of Aquileia and Istria to Poppo of Weimar-Orlamümde. Duke Henry served as Vogt (bailiff) of the patriarchate under his brother Patriarch Ulrich I. With Ulrich he backed King Henry V of Germany when he enforced the abdication of his father Emperor Henry IV in 1105. In the course of the ongoing Investiture Controversy he entered into an armed conflict with Prince-Archbishop Conrad I of Salzburg in 1121.

With Henry's death in 1122, the Eppenstein line became extinct. The Carinthian duchy was taken over by his godson Henry from the rising House of Sponheim.

Henry of Eppenstein House of Eppenstein Born: c. 1050 Died: 4 December 1122
Preceded by Liutold	Duke of Carinthia; Margrave of Verona; 1090-1122	Succeeded by Henry IV
