= Limburg (Weilheim an der Teck) =

Mountain in Baden-Württemberg, Germany

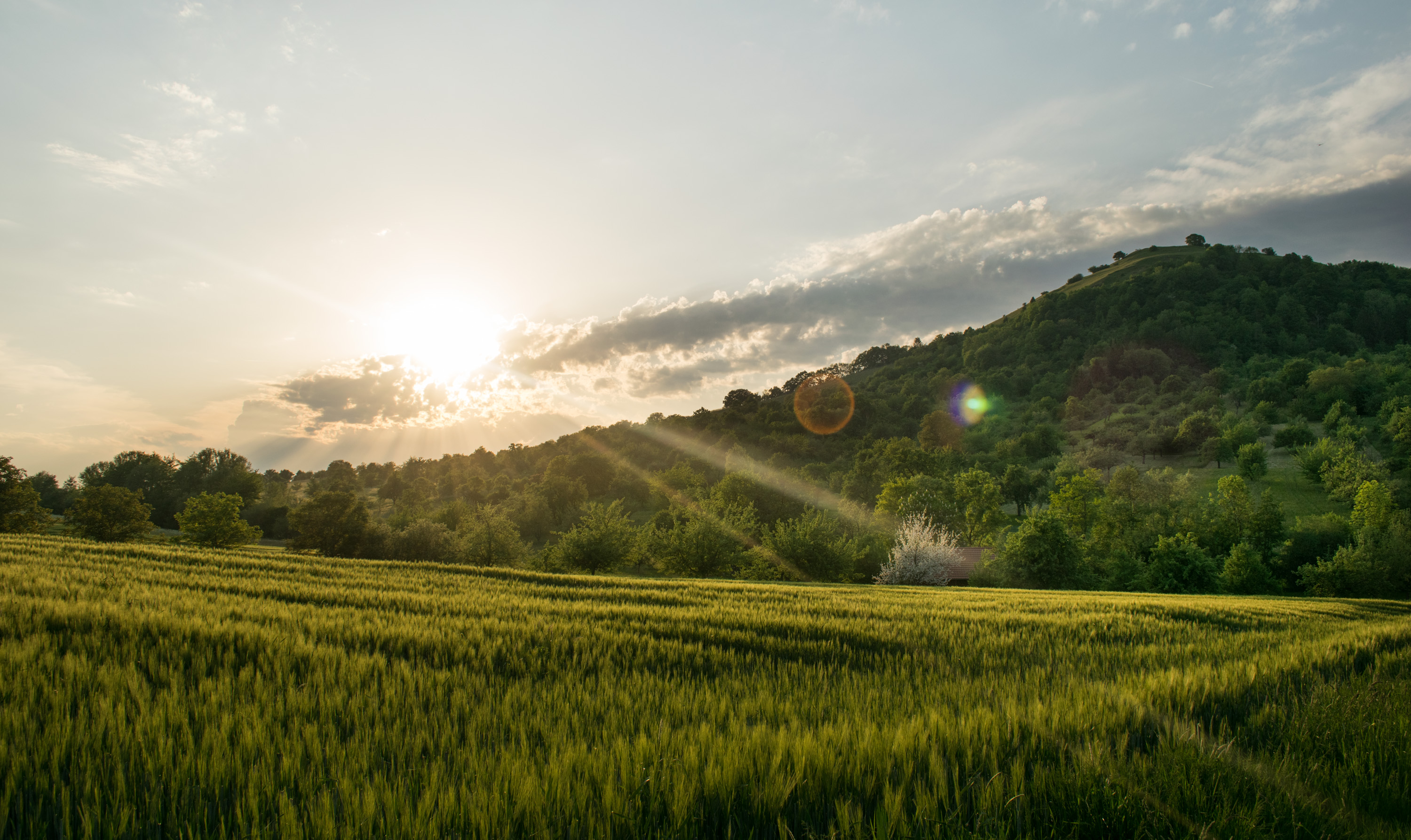

Highest point
- Elevation: 597 m (1,959 ft)
- Coordinates: 48°36′15″N 9°32′11″E

Geography
- Location: Baden-Württemberg, Germany

Limburg (Weilheim an der Teck) is a mountain of Baden-Württemberg, Germany. Striking is the breakdown of vegetation: the summit is covered with lean lawn and some solitary Tilia. Below this is a zone of scrub forest on the southern slope with vineyards, and on the lower slopes of extensive orchards.

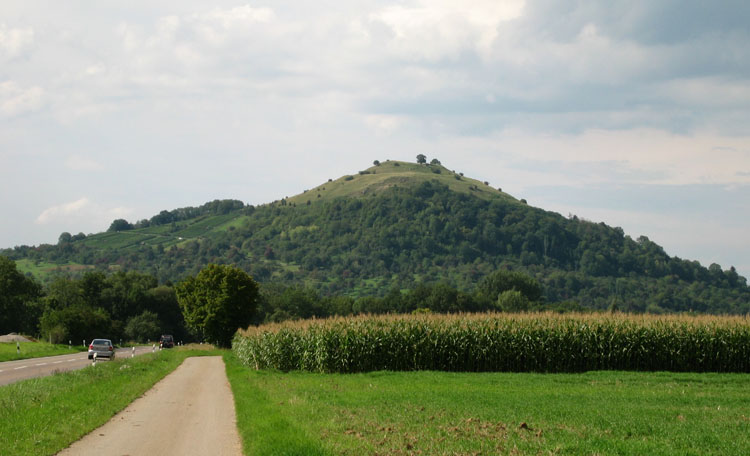
Limburg, view from the east

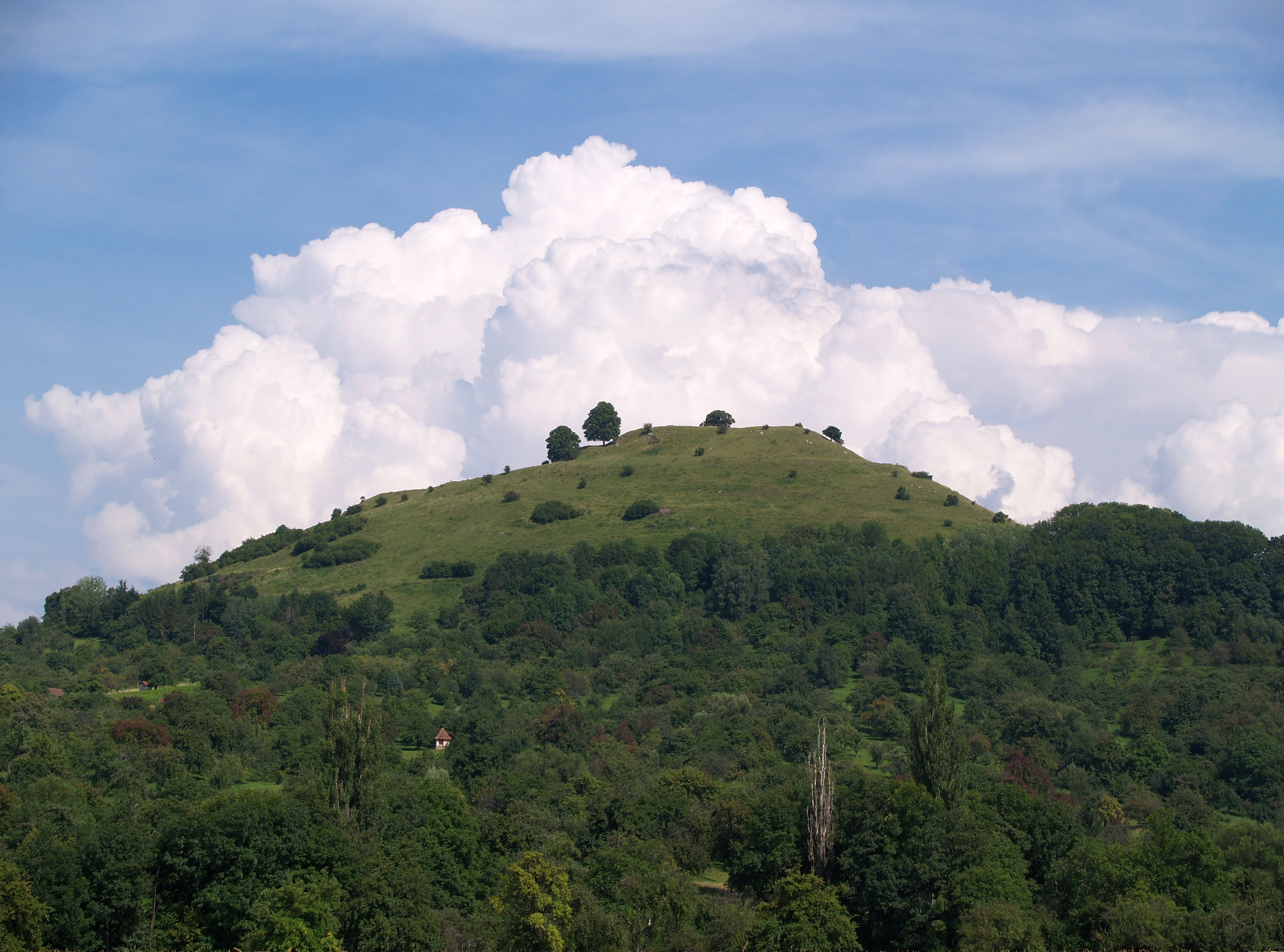
Limburg, view from the west

== Geology ==
The Limburg is a mountain of volcanic origin, more precisely a formerly active volcanic vent of the Swabian Jura. However, it does not correspond, despite its striking cone shape the Ashes volcanoes on the type of Etna or Vesuvius. Before about 17 million years ago there came here to massive gas and dust explosions when percolating water met in the columns of the Jura on a magma bubble that had formed in the depths. The up broken rocks fell back into the crater and solidified over time to basaltic. Here no molten lava came to the surface. She remained rather stuck in the volcanic vent and froze there to Basalt. In the following year, millions the Jurassic layers were eroded more and more. The Basalttuffpfropf was more resistant than the surrounding limestone and remained as the northern slope of the Swabian Alb mountain upstream cone stand and testified that this formerly extended further to the north.
