= March of Verona =

Frontier territory of the Holy Roman Empire in northeast Italy (952–1167)

March of Verona and Aquileia Markgrafschaft Verona (German) Marca de Verona (Venetian)
- March of Holy Roman Empire: Duchy of Bavaria (952–976); Duchy of Carinthia (976–1151); Margraviate of Baden (1151–1167)
- 952–1167
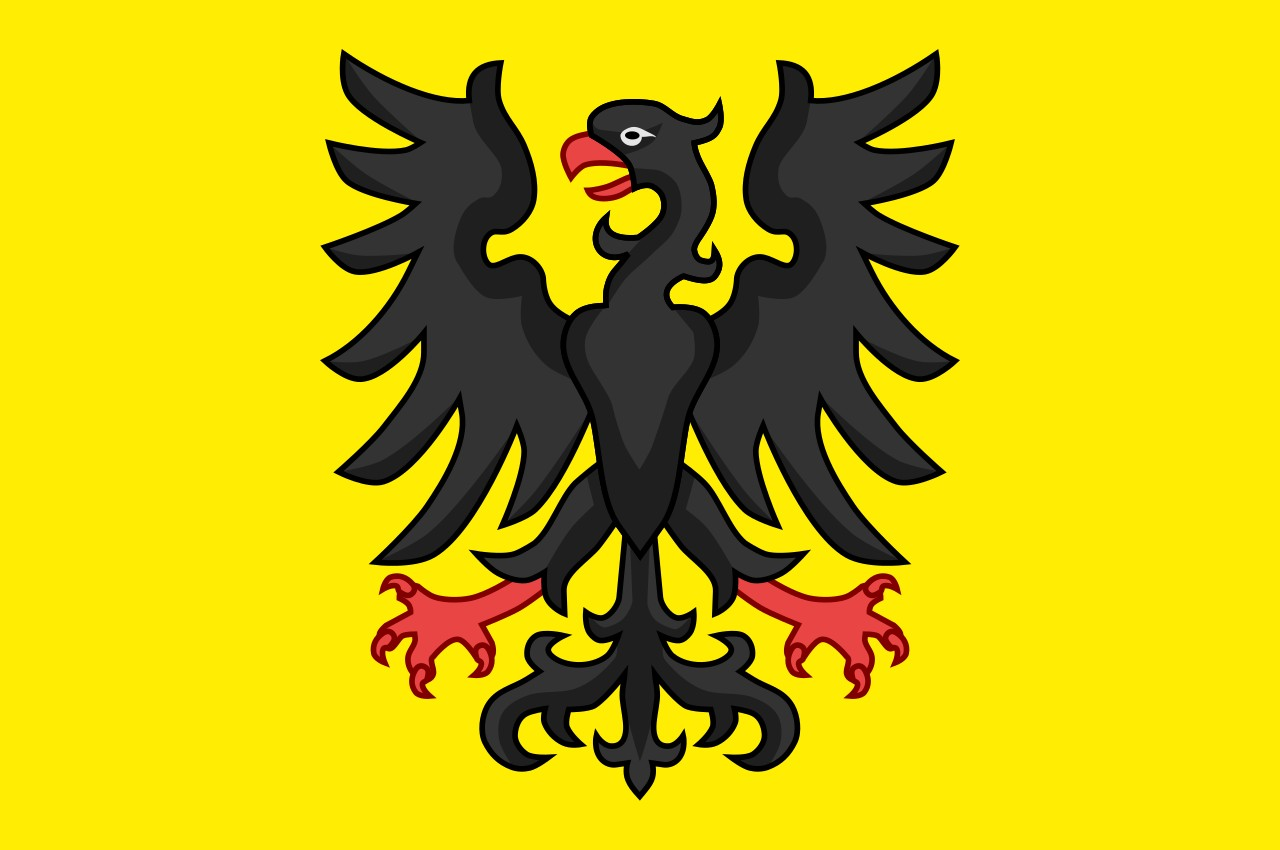
- Flag of the March of Verona

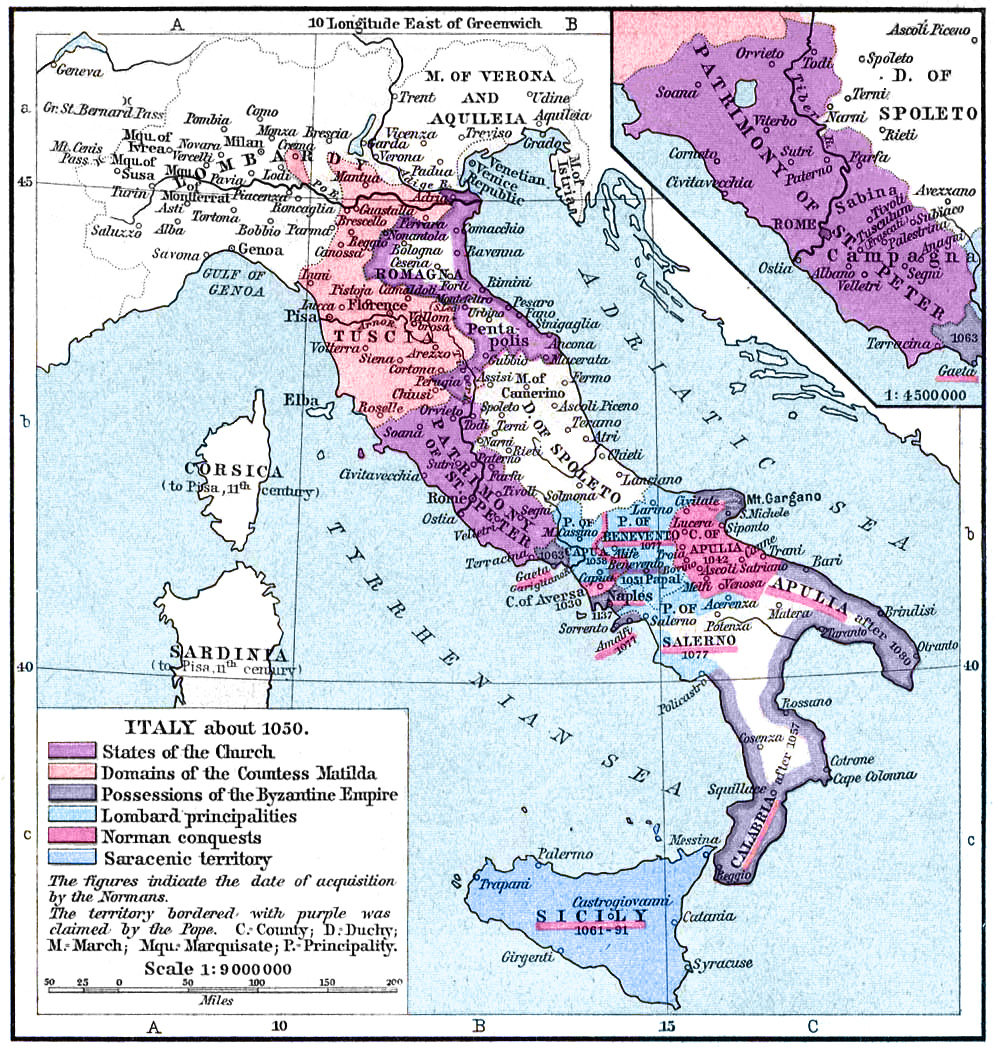
- Italy about 1050, with the Veronese march in the northeast
- Capital: Verona
- Historical era: Medieval Europe
  - Established: 952
  - Formation of the Lombard League: 1167
Preceded by	Succeeded by
Duchy of Friuli	Patria del Friuli; Lombard League
- Today part of: Italy; Slovenia

The March of Verona and Aquileia was a vast march (frontier district) of the Holy Roman Empire in the northeastern Italian region during the Middle Ages, centered on the cities of Verona and Aquileia. Seized by King Otto I of Germany in 952, it was held by the Dukes of Bavaria; from 976 in personal union with the Duchy of Carinthia. The margravial regime ended with the advent of the Lombard League in 1167.

== Geography ==
The march roughly comprised the historic Friuli and Veneto regions from the border with Lombardy and the Chiese River in the west to the Tagliamento and the Isonzo (Soča) in the east, the upper Soča valley within the Julian Alps is today part of the Slovenian Goriška region. Initially it also included present-day Trentino uphill to the Adige river in the northwest. Except for the lagoons controlled by Venice, it stretched from the Adriatic Sea to the crest of the Dolomites and the Carnic Alps in the north, where the mountainous Carnia region borders with Carinthia. The western lands around Verona comprised the Po Valley, the Euganean and Berici Hills, the Venetian Prealps and Lake Garda.

Beside the capital Verona near the southwestern border with Tuscany, the march included the episcopal seat of Aquileia, the historic Friulian capital Udine with nearby Cividale and the port of Grado in the east, as well as the major cities of Vicenza, Treviso, and Padua, which played a vital role in forming the Lombard League. The March of Verona was a strategically important province, which governed the southern approaches to the Alpine passes leading to Germany, and significant in the—ultimately failed—attempts of the Holy Roman Emperors to maintain the rule over Italy.

== History ==
The Marca Veronensis et Aquileiensis was created by King Berengar I of Friuli about 890 as part of a general restructuring of his realm, when it replaced the former Carolingian March of Friuli last held by Berengar's liensman Walfred. It was separated from the Italian kingdom after the German king Otto I had campaigned against King Berengar II of Italy in 951. At the Reichstag meeting at Augsburg in the next year, Berengar II retained Italy, but had to renounce the Veronese march, which was attached to the stem duchy of Bavaria under Otto's brother Duke Henry I. At that time the March of Istria was attached to Verona as a county. From 952 to 975, both Carinthia and Verona were under the control of the dukes of Bavaria, forming a massive Italian, German, and Slavic fief ruled by relatives of the Saxon Ottonian dynasty.

After several revolts led by his Bavarian cousins, Emperor Otto II in 976 deposed Duke Henry II of Bavaria and established the Duchy of Carinthia under the loyal Luitpolding vassal Henry the Younger on the southeastern territories. He also received Verona as a Carinthian march and from that time on, it was under the control of the Carinthian dukes and at other times not. Already in 975, a commune had been chartered in the capital city, when Otto II ceded to Verona the powers of the marquisate. From this time Verona and several other cities in the march gradually developed into independent city-states, and in turn the title Margrave of Verona became an essentially empty hereditary honour in the ducal houses of Bavaria and Carinthia. Henceforth the Holy Roman Emperors began to appoint vicars to represent them, instead of margraves, in Verona.

From 1004 King Henry II of Germany, having conquered the Kingdom of Italy, allotted several Veronese territories in the Adige Valley around Trento (Trient) to the Bishops of Trent. His Salian successor, Emperor Conrad II, upon his coronation in 1027 separated these lands from the Italian kingdom and gave the Trent bishops immediate authority, elevating them to the rank of Imperial Prince-Bishops. Trentino remained under episcopal rule—contested by the Counts of Tyrol—until its secularisation in 1803.

In 1061 Empress Agnes enfeoffed the Swabian count Berthold from the House of Zähringen with Carinthia and Verona. Though he could not prevail, neither as Carinthian duke nor as Veronese margrave, he bequested the title to his descendants from the House of Baden, who went on to rule their Swabian territories as a "Margraviate". At that time in 1070, Istria was resurrected into a march again and detached from Verona, while in the course of the Investiture Controversy in 1077 the territories of Friuli in the east, around the episcopal city of Aquileia were separated from the March to provide an ecclesiastical Patriarchate of Aquileia, like Trent an immediate vassal of King Henry IV of Germany.

In 1151 the Hohenstaufen King Conrad III of Germany finally divested Duke Henry V of Carinthia of the remaining Veronese march and enfeoffed Margrave Herman III of Baden. However, in 1164, the most important cities formed the Veronese League, a Städtebund association aimed at protecting their independence against the Italian policies of Conrad's nephew Emperor Frederick Barbarossa. The League was led by Venice; other members were Verona, Padua, Vicenza, and Treviso. In 1167, the Veronese cities joined the Lombard League; this constituted the de facto end of the march, confirmed by the Lombard victory at the 1176 Battle of Legnano. The Emperors continued to name vicars, though by then the office was purely nominal, as from the 13th century onwards the actual lords of Verona were the podestàs from the Scaliger (della Scala) dynasty. In 1405 the Veronese citizens submitted to Venice, which until about 1420 conquered most of the territory of the former march and incorporated it into the Domini di Terraferma.

== List of Margraves of Verona ==
=== Dukes of Bavaria ===
- 951 – 955 Henry I, also margrave of Friuli and Istria

- 953 – 955 Milo, count from 930 or 931, ruled as margrave under Henry

- 955 – 975 Henry II the Wrangler, son, deposed

=== Dukes of Carinthia ===
Carinthian panther of the dukes of Carinthia

- 976 – 978 Henry III the Younger, deposed
- 978 – 985 Otto I
- 985 – 989 Henry III the Younger, again
- 989 – 995 Henry II the Wrangler, again
- 995 – 1004 Otto I, again
- 1004 – 1011 Conrad I
- 1011 – 1035 Adalbero of Eppenstein
- 1035 – 1039 Conrad II, son of Conrad I
  - 1039 – 1047 vacant, directly ruled by King Henry III
- 1047 – 1055 Welf
- 1056 – 1061 Conrad III
- 1061 – 1077 Berthold I
- 1077 – 1090 Liutold of Eppenstein
- 1090 – 1122 Henry IV
- 1122 – 1123 Henry V
- 1123 – 1135 Engelbert
- 1135 – 1144 Ulrich I
- 1144 – 1151 Henry VI

=== Margraves of Baden ===
- 1151 – 1160 Herman III, son
- 1160 – 1190 Herman IV, son
- 1190 – 1243 Herman V, son
  - 1223 – 1233 Ezzelino
- 1243 – 1250 Herman VI, son of Herman V
- 1250 – 1268 Frederick I, son, beheaded
