= Adalbero of Carinthia =

Duke of Carinthia

Adalbero of Eppenstein
- Duke of Carinthia
- Duke: 1011/12–1035
- Predecessor: Conrad I
- Successor: Conrad the Younger
- Born: c. 980
- Died: 28 November 1039; Ebersberg, Bavaria
- Buried: Geisenfeld Abbey
- Noble family: House of Eppenstein
- Spouse: Beatrix of Swabia
- Father: Markward of Eppenstein
- Mother: Hadmud of Ebersberg

Adalbero of Eppenstein (c. 980 – 28 November 1039) was Duke of Carinthia and Margrave of Verona from 1011 or 1012 until 1035.

== Biography ==
Adalbero was the son of the Bavarian count Markward of Eppenstein, who around 970 had married Hadmud, a daughter of Count Adalbero of Ebersberg and ruled as Margrave of Styria. About 1000 Adalbero succeeded his father as Styrian margrave. He was married to Beatrix, probably a daughter of Duke Herman II of Swabia from the Conradine dynasty and sister-in-law of the later Salian emperor Conrad II.

Upon the death of the Salian duke Conrad I in 1011, the German king Henry II enfeoffed Adalbero with Carinthia. Adalbero's Carinthian dominions then included the March of Carniola, the Windic March and the rule over the vast March of Verona stretching from the Trentino up to the Isonzo River. Late Duke Conrad's son and heir, Conrad the Younger was a minor when his father died and therefore was not taken into account, becoming a bitter rival.

The tide began to turn when the Ottonian dynasty became extinct with the death of Emperor Henry II in 1024 and the Salian scion Conrad II was elected his successor. Initially Adalbero sought a good relationship, he even acted as the emperor's swordsman at a 1027 synod in Frankfurt and during the coronation of Conrad's son Henry III as King of the Romans in Aachen at Easter 1028. However, after the court diet on 18 May 1035 Duke Adalbero was forced to renounce all his offices and fiefdoms.

Nevertheless, the Freising bishop Egilbert, a councillor to Conrad's son King Henry III, advised the Princes and Henry himself to not recognise the deposition. Despite this, Adalbert lost his duchy and the march of Carantania, though the duchy would remain vacant until 2 February 1036. Furious, he began a bloody revenge campaign against the Salian liensmen in Carinthia, thereby killing Count William of Friesach, the husband of Saint Hemma of Gurk. Finally he had to retire to the Bavarian estates of his mother in Ebersberg, where he died in 1039.

The large Eppenstein estates in Carinthia were held by his eldest son Markward IV, whose sons Liutold and Henry went on to rule over the duchy from 1077 to 1122.

== Marriage and children ==
Adalbero married to Beatrix of Swabia (died February 23 after 1025), probably a daughter of the Conradine duke Herman II. Among their children were:

- Markward IV of Eppenstein (d. 1076), father of Liutold of Eppenstein, Duke of Carinthia from 1077 to 1090, and Henry of Eppenstein, Duke of Carinthia from 1090 to 1122
- Adalbero of Eppenstein, Bishop of Bamberg from 1053 to 1057
- Willibirg (?), married Margrave Ottokar I of Styria

== Sources ==
- Wolfram, Herwig (2006). Conrad II, 990-1039: Emperor of Three Kingdoms. Translated by Kaiser, Denise A. Pennsylvania University Press.

Adalbero of Carinthia House of Eppenstein Born: c. 980 Died: 1039
Preceded by Conrad I	Duke of Carinthia; 1011–1035	Succeeded by Conrad II
