= Lambach Abbey =

Coordinates: 48°05′27″N 13°52′38″E

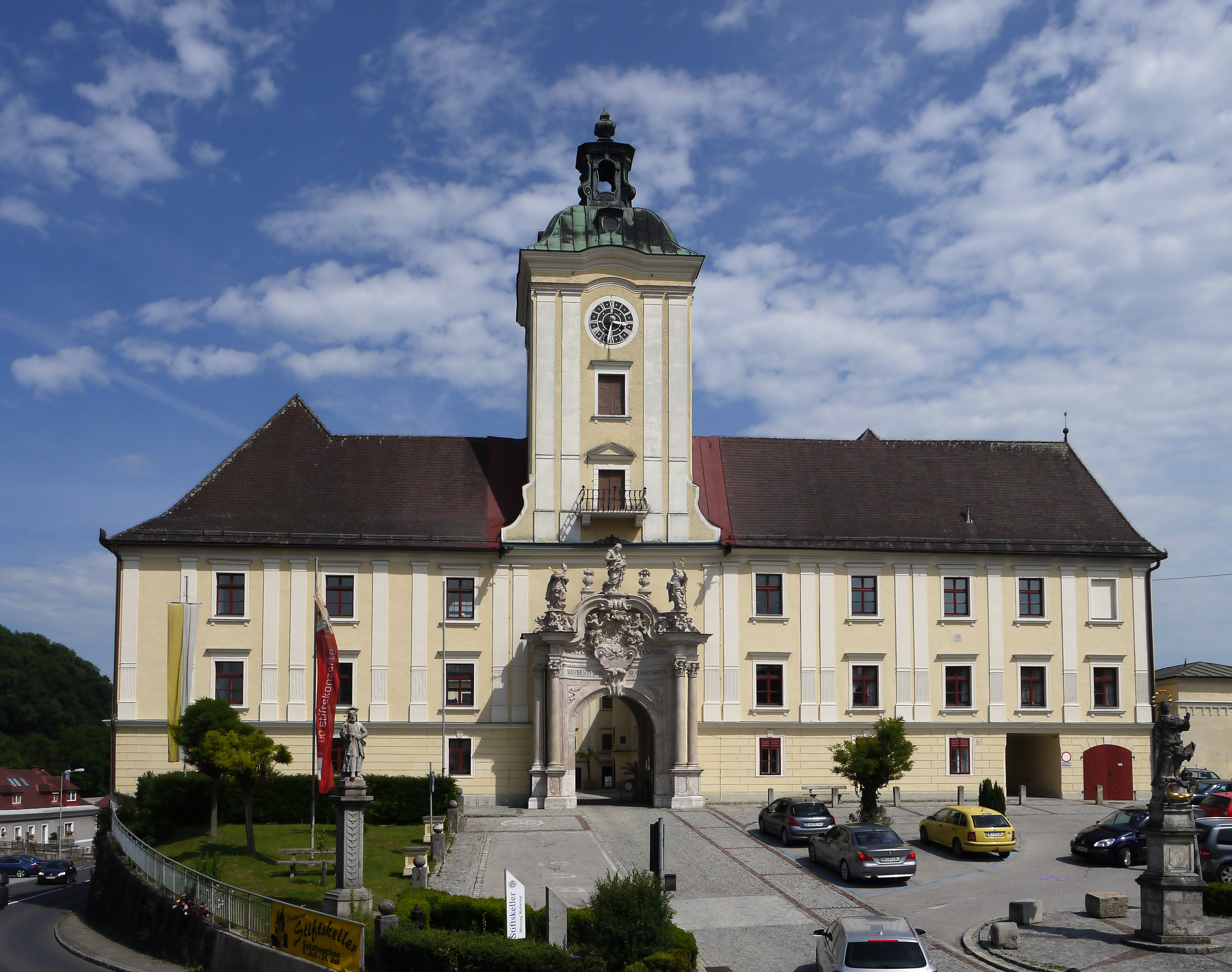
Lambach Abbey

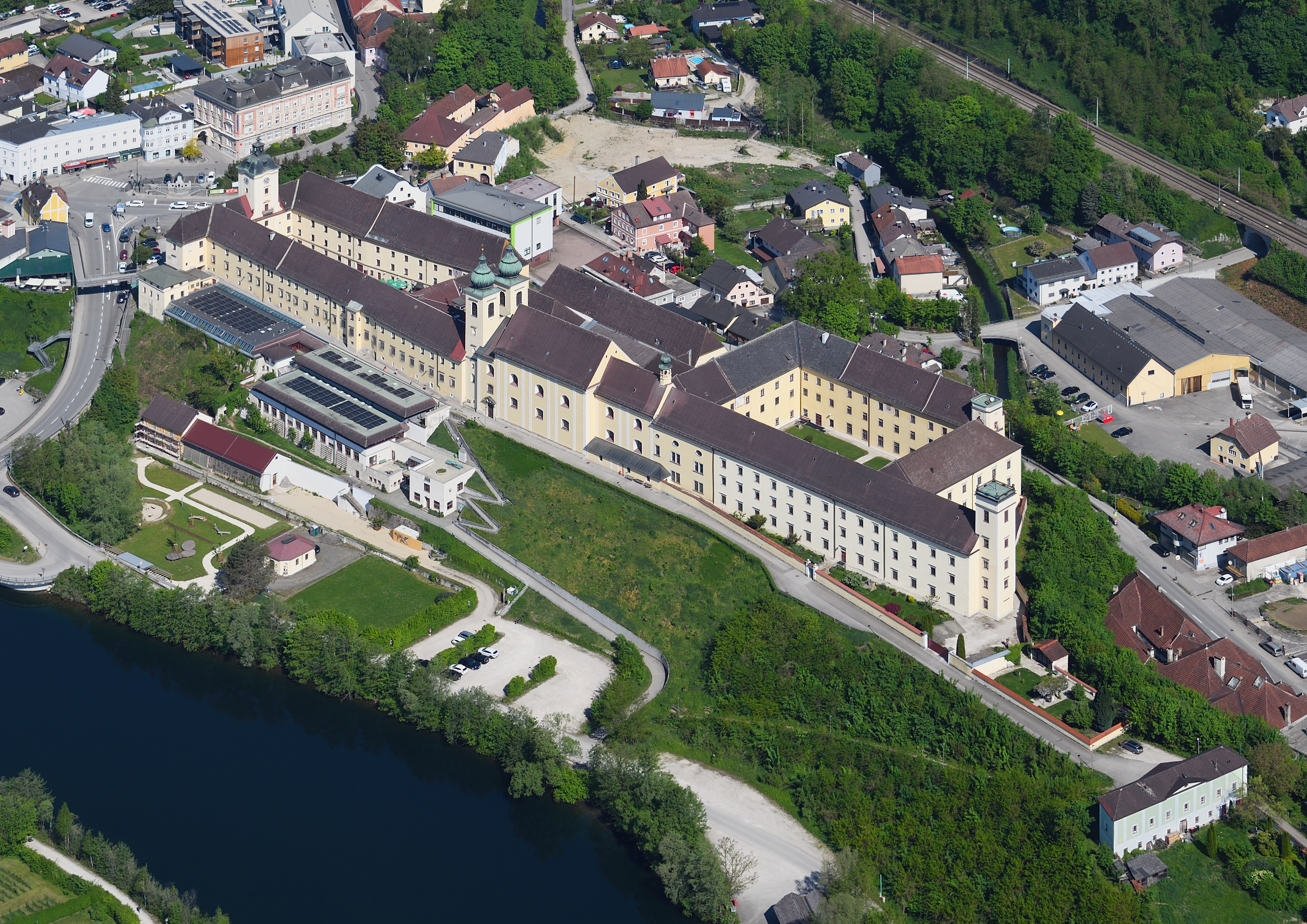
Aerial view of Lambach Abbey

Lambach Abbey (German: Stift Lambach) is a Benedictine monastery in Lambach in the Wels-Land district of Upper Austria, Austria.

== History ==
A monastery was founded in Lambach in about 1040 by Count Arnold II of Lambach-Wels. His son, Bishop Adalbero of Würzburg (later canonised), changed the monastery into a Benedictine abbey in 1056, which it has been since. During the 17th and 18th centuries a great deal of work in the Baroque style was carried out, much of it by the Carlone family. Lambach escaped the dissolution of the monasteries of Emperor Joseph II in the 1780s.

In 1897/98, Adolf Hitler lived in the town of Lambach with his parents and attended the monastery school, where he saw the hakenkreuz used in decorative carving on the stone and woodwork of the building. He later used it as a symbol for the Nazi Party, placing it in a white circle with a red background for use as a flag.

== Cultural features ==
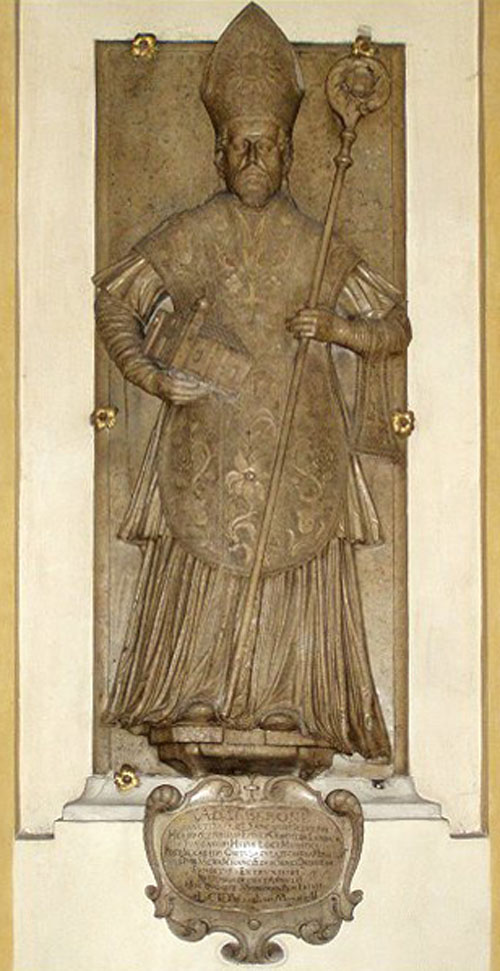
Bishop Adalbero

Between Easter Sunday and 31 October guided tours are offered every day at 14:00. The tour includes entrance to the Romanesque frescoes, the Baroque theatre, the library and the Baroque church.

The abbey has preserved much of cultural interest. It contains the oldest extant Romanesque frescoes in Southern Germany and Austria, and the former abbey tavern, now a pharmacy, with a beautiful Baroque façade. The abbey's Baroque theatre has also been restored to working order and the summer refectory from the early 18th century by Carlo Antonio Carlone has been converted into a concert hall. The ambulatory by Diego Carlone from the same period is of great magnificence. An unexpected feature is the set of Baroque dwarves in the monastery garden (see also Gleink Abbey).

The abbey church was also refurbished in the Baroque style, with an organ by Christoph Egedacher and contains the tomb of Saint Adelbero. The abbey also possesses the medieval St. Adelbero's Chalice, although it is rarely on view to the public, besides a large collection of sacred art. The library was constructed about 1691 and contains approximately 50,000 volumes as well as archive material.

Since 1625 the abbey has belonged to the Austrian Congregation, which since 1893 forms part of the Benedictine Confederation.
