= Duchy of Carinthia =

976–1918 state of the Holy Roman Empire and later Austrian Empire

Duchy of Carinthia Herzogtum Kärnten (German) Ducatus Carinthiae (Latin) Vojvodina Koroška (Slovene)
- 976–1918
- Flag Coat of arms

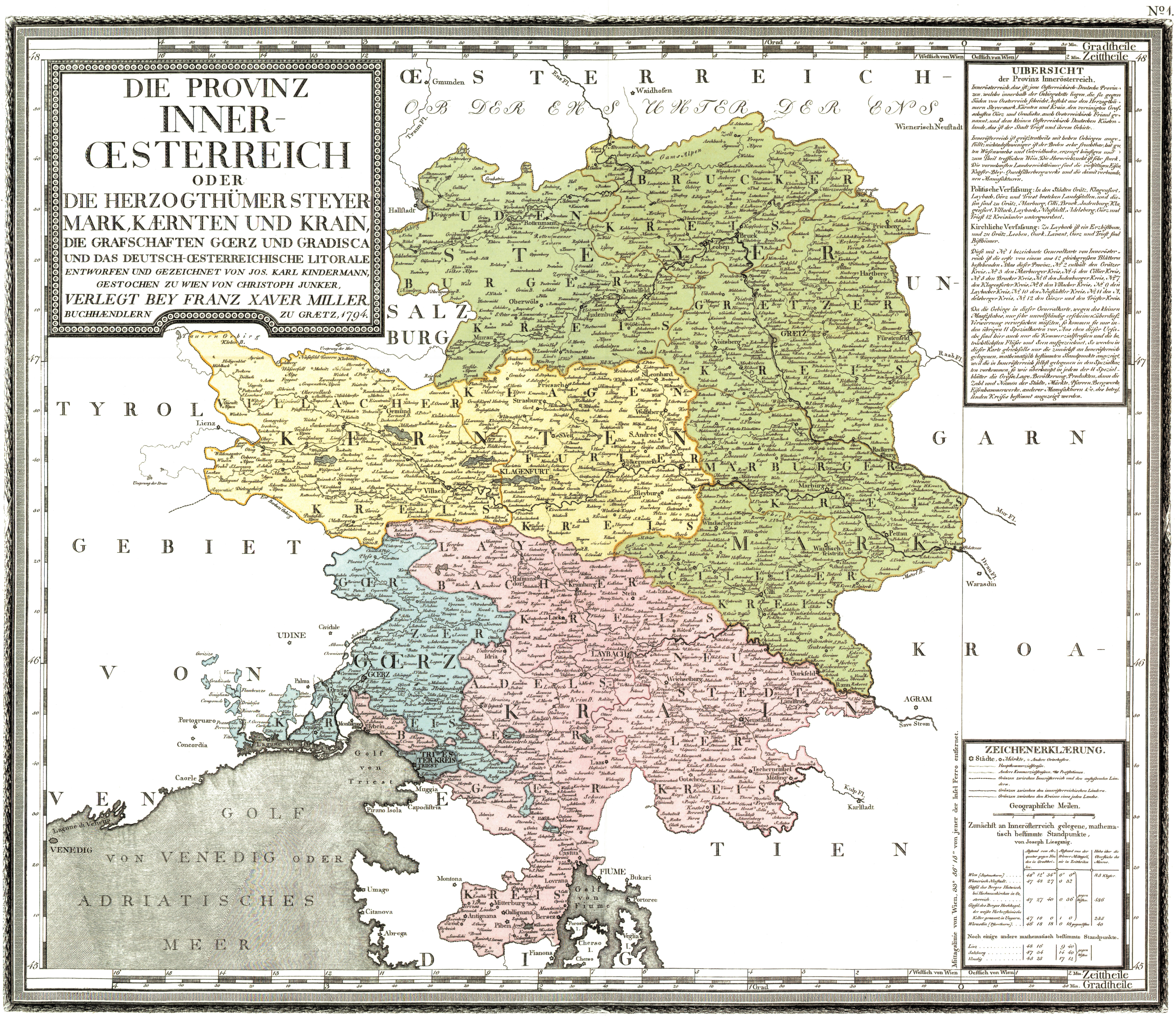
- Carinthia (yellow) within Inner Austria, c. 1790
- Status: State of the Holy Roman Empire (until 1806), Part of the Habsburg monarchy (from 1526), constituent land of the Austrian Empire (1804–67), Cisleithanian crown land of Austria-Hungary (from 1867)
- Capital: Sankt Veit an der Glan (Šentvid ob Glini) until 1518, then Klagenfurt (Celovec)
- Common languages: Southern Bavarian; Latin; Carinthian Slovene
- Government: Duchy
- Duke
  - 976–978: Henry I (first)
  - 1916–1918: Charles I (last)
- Historical era: Middle Ages
  - Created Duchy: 976
  - To Habsburg dukes of Austria: 1335
  - Incorporated into Inner Austria: 1379
  - Joined Austrian Circle: 1512
  - Upper Carinthia ceded to Illyrian Provinces: 1809
  - Restored to Austrian Empire: 1815
  - Disestablished: 1918
  - Carinthian Plebiscite: 1920
Preceded by
| March of Carinthia |
Succeeded by
| Republic of German-Austria |
| Kingdom of Serbs, Croats and Slovenes |
| Kingdom of Italy |
- Today part of: Austria; Italy; Slovenia

The Duchy of Carinthia (Latin: Ducatus Carinthiae; German: Herzogtum Kärnten; Slovene: Vojvodina Koroška) was a duchy located in southern Austria and parts of northern Slovenia. It was separated from the Duchy of Bavaria in 976, and was the first newly created Imperial State after the original German stem duchies.

Carinthia remained a State of the Holy Roman Empire until its dissolution in 1806, though from 1335 it was ruled within the Austrian dominions of the Habsburg dynasty. A constituent part of the Habsburg monarchy and of the Austrian Empire, it remained a Cisleithanian crown land of Austria-Hungary until 1918. By the 1920 Carinthian plebiscite in October 1920, the main area of the duchy formed the Austrian state of Carinthia.

== History ==
In the seventh century the area was part of the Slavic principality of Carantania, which fell under the suzerainty of Duke Odilo of Bavaria in about 743. The Bavarian stem duchy was incorporated into the Carolingian Empire when Charlemagne deposed Odilo's son Duke Tassilo III in 788. In the 843 partition by the Treaty of Verdun, Carinthia became part of East Francia under King Louis the German. From 889 to 976 it was the Carinthian March of the renewed Bavarian duchy, though in 927 the local Count Berthold of the Luitpolding dynasty was vested with ducal rights by the German king Henry the Fowler. After Berthold became Duke of Bavaria in 938, both territories were ruled by him. Upon his death in 948 the Luitpoldings, though heirs of the royal Ottonian dynasty, were not able to retain their possessions, as King Otto I bought the loyalty of his younger brother Henry I with the Bavarian lands.

=== Establishment ===
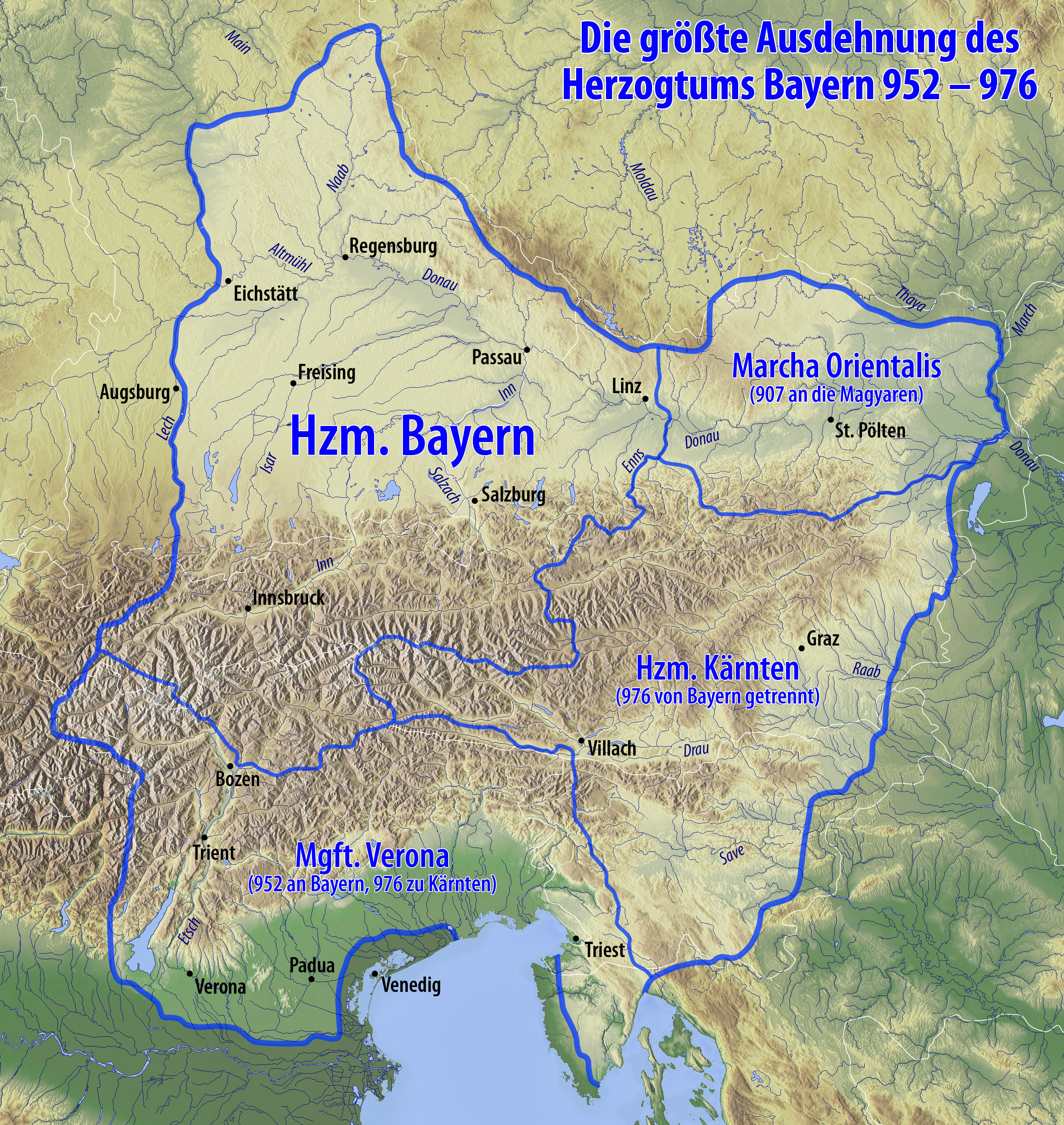
Carinthia with the Bavarian Duchy in the mid-late 10th century.

Duke Henry's son Henry II "the Quarreller" from 974 onwards, revolted against his cousin Emperor Otto II, whereupon he was deposed as Duke of Bavaria in favour of Otto's nephew Duke Otto I of Swabia. At the same time Emperor Otto II created a sixth duchy in addition to the original stem duchies, the new Duchy of Carinthia. He reverted the possession of the territories to the Luitpoldings, when he split Carinthia from the Bavarian lands and installed the former Duke Berthold's son Henry the Younger as duke in 976.

Over the centuries, the name 'Carinthia' (Kärnten) gradually replaced former 'Carantania'. The realm of the Carinthian dukes initially comprised a vast territory including the marches of Styria (marchia Carantana), Carniola and Istria; they also ruled over the Italian March of Verona in the south. Nevertheless, Henry the Younger was the first and also the last Luitpolding duke; as he chose to join the unsuccessful War of the Three Henries against Emperor Otto II, he lost Carinthia two years later and was succeeded by the Emperor's nephew Otto I, a scion of the Salian dynasty. Though Henry once again managed to regain the ducal title in 985, Carinthia upon his death in 989 fell back to the Imperial Ottonian dynasty in Bavaria.

=== Eppensteins and Sponheims ===
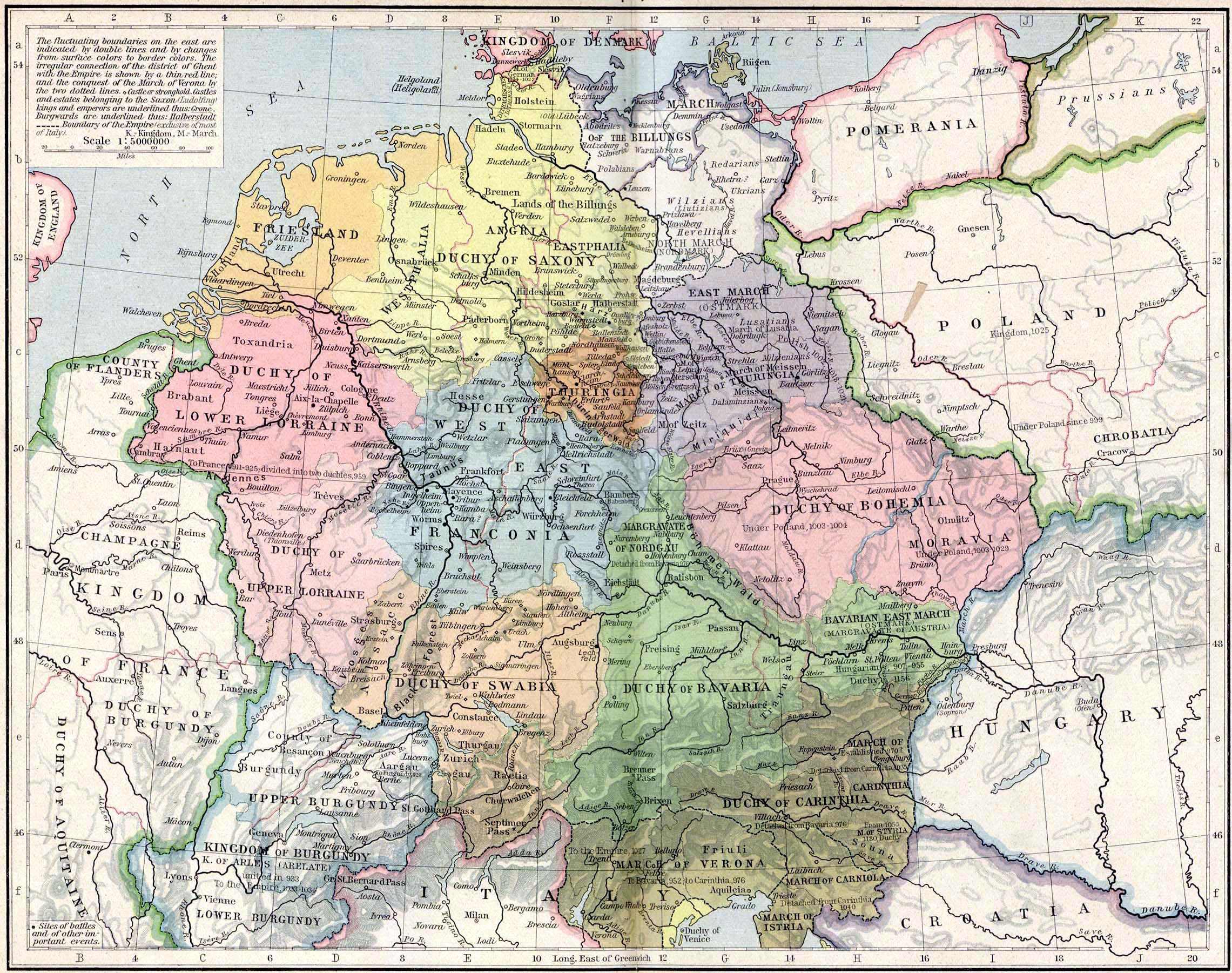
The Duchy of Carinthia within the Holy Roman Empire at its maximum expansion

Carinthia, however, remained a separate entity, and in 1012 Count Adalbero I of Eppenstein, Margrave of the Carinthian March (later Styria) since about 1000, was vested with the duchy by the last Ottonian emperor Henry II, while the Istrian march was separated and given to Count Poppo of Weimar. Adalbero was removed from office in 1035 after he had fallen out of favour with the Salian Emperor Conrad II. In 1039 Carinthia was inherited by Emperor Henry III himself, who split off the Carniolan march the following year and granted it to Margrave Poppo of Istria. In 1077, the duchy was given to Luitpold, again a member of the Eppensteiner family, which, however, became extinct with the death of Luitpold's younger brother Henry III of Carinthia in 1122. Upon his death the duchy was further reduced in area: a large part of the Eppenstein lands in what is today Upper Styria passed to Margrave Ottokar II of Styria.

The remainder of Carinthia passed from Duke Henry III to his godchild Henry from the House of Sponheim, who ruled as Henry IV, from 1122 to his early death the following year. The most outstanding of the Spanheim dukes was Bernhard, the first Carinthian duke who was actually described and honoured in documents as "prince of the land". The last Spanheim duke was Ulrich III; he signed an inheritance treaty with his brother Archbishop Philip of Spanheim of Salzburg, who, however, could not prevail against the Bohemian king Ottokar II Přemysl. In spite of being supported by the Habsburg king Rudolf I of Germany, who defeated Ottokar II at the Battle on the Marchfeld in 1278, Philip never gained actual power. The duchy was seized by Rudolph and Philip died a year later in 1279.

=== Habsburgs ===
Rudolf, after being elected King of the Romans and defeating King Ottokar II, at first gave Carinthia to Count Meinhard II of Gorizia-Tyrol. In 1335, after the death of Henry, the last male of this line, Emperor Louis the Bavarian gave Carinthia and the southern part of the Tyrol as an imperial fief to the Habsburg family on 2 May in Linz. The Habsburgs would continue to rule Carinthia until 1918. As with the other component parts of the Habsburg monarchy, Carinthia remained a semi-autonomous state with its own constitutional structure for a long time. The Habsburgs divided up their territories within the family twice, according to the 1379 Treaty of Neuberg and again in 1564. Each time, the Duchy of Carinthia became part of Inner Austria and was ruled jointly with the adjacent duchies of Styria and Carniola.

Carinthia saw five Turkish incursions into its territory between 1473 and 1483, with much plundering and killing at the hands of Ottoman cavalry. These raids led to the Carinthian Peasant Revolt of 1478, as peasants, left unprotected by the nobility, tried to defend themselves and formed a peasants' league to organize their own defense. The raids also prompted the construction of defensive structures like fortified churches and castles (tabor).

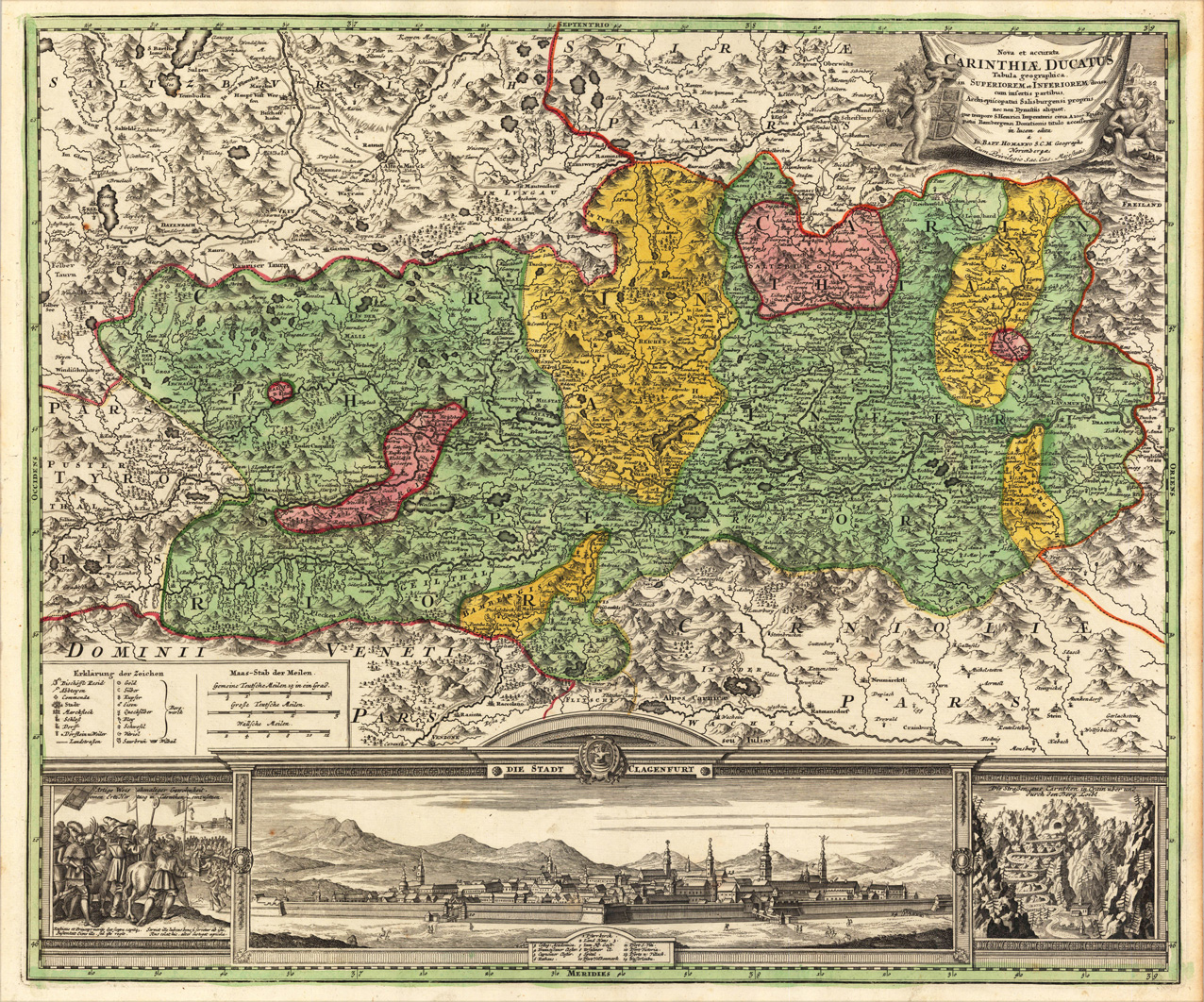
Early 18th century map of Carinthia showing fiefs owned by Salzburg (in pink) and Bamberg (in yellow)

Empress Maria Theresa of Austria and her son Joseph II attempted to create a more unitary Habsburg state, and in 1804 Carinthia was integrated into the newly established Austrian Empire under Francis II/I. According to the 1809 Treaty of Schönbrunn, the Upper Carinthian territories around Villach formed part of the short-lived Napoleonic Illyrian Provinces; Carinthia as a whole remained a part of the Habsburg Kingdom of Illyria until its dissolution in 1849.

In 1867, the duchy became a crown land of Cisleithania, the western part of Austria-Hungary (see History of Austria).

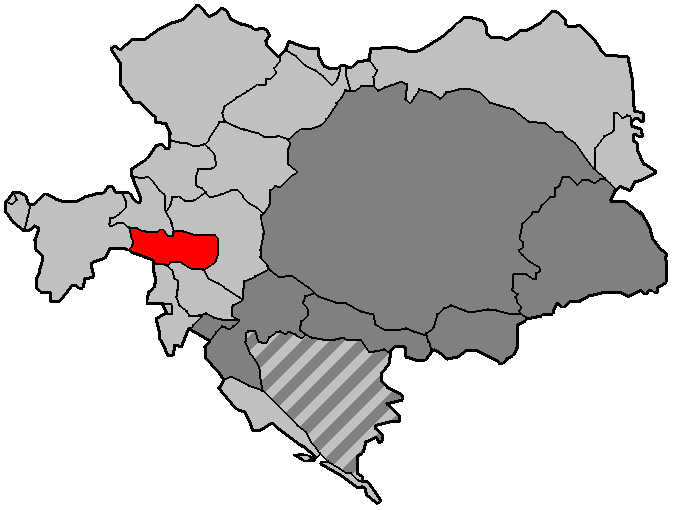
The Cisleithanian crown land of Carinthia within Austria-Hungary

Over the centuries, the German language, which carried more prestige, expanded at the expense of Slovene, but the fact that in the 16th century the Estates of Carinthia could still point out that Carinthia was "a Windic Archduchy", i.e. a sovereign Slovene principality, shows that the Carinthian people were aware of their ancient and pre-German roots.

=== World War I and Carinthian Plebiscite ===
During World War I, Carinthia experienced a relatively high number of war deaths: thirty-seven for every 1,000 inhabitants. This was higher than in most other German-speaking areas of Austria-Hungary (except German South Moravia).

Following the end of the war and the dissolution of Austria-Hungary, the 1919 Treaty of Saint-Germain stipulated the Carinthian Canal Valley stretching from Tarvisio as far as Pontafel (187 square miles) go to Italy and that the Slovene-speaking areas of the Meža Valley, the Drava Valley area around Unterdrauburg, which was afterwards renamed Dravograd, and the Jezersko area (128 square miles of territory) be ceded to the new SHS State. The Kingdom of Serbs, Croats and Slovenes, however, was not satisfied with these parts of the former duchy and also occupied land north of the Karawanks mountain range, including the capital city of Klagenfurt. The Entente powers decided on a two-stage referendum, of which the first stage, the Carinthian Plebiscite was held on 10 October 1920 to determine the fate of Carinthia. The outcome in favour of Austria did not change the borders as decided upon in the Treaty of Saint-Germain.

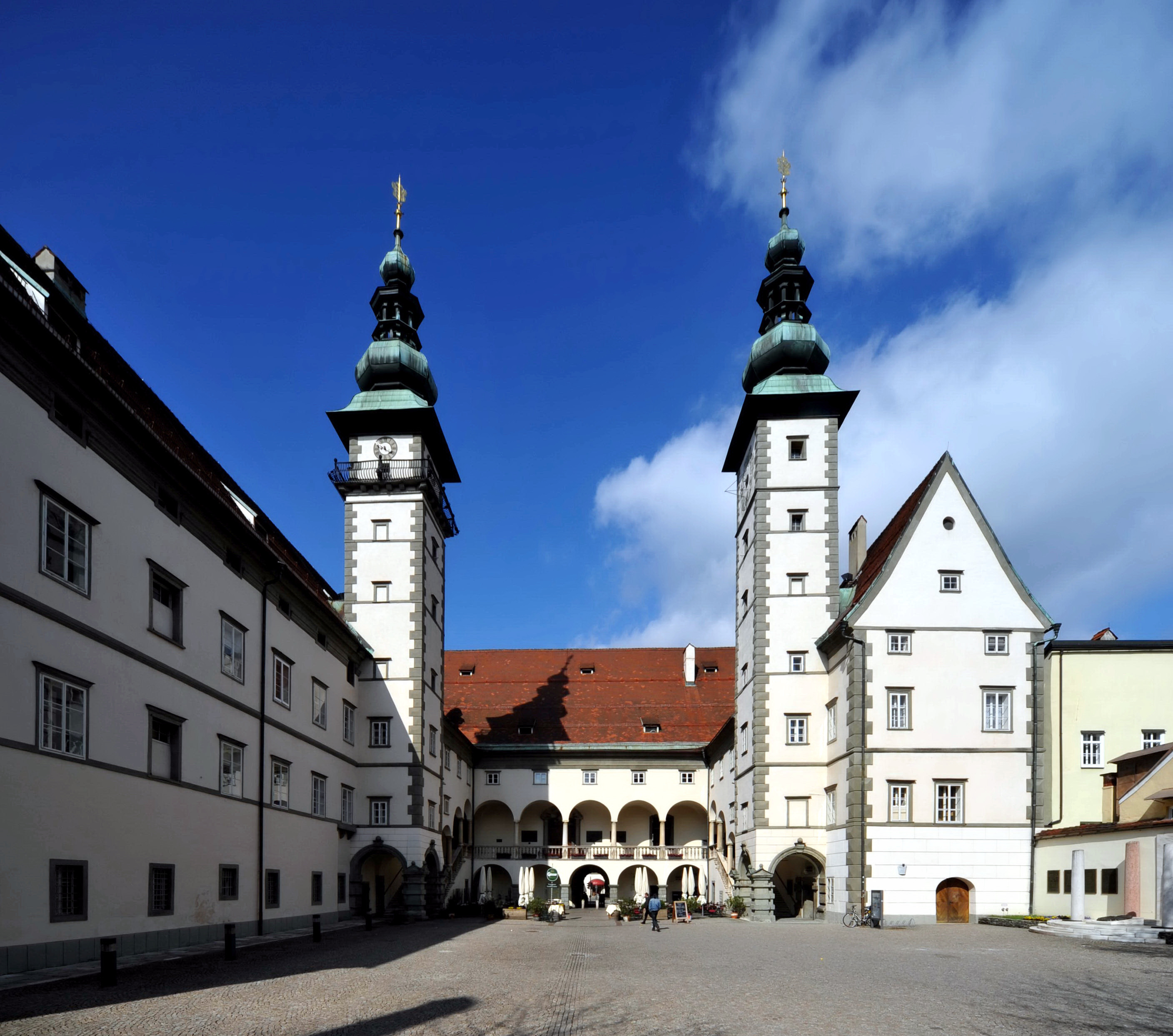
Klagenfurt Landhaus

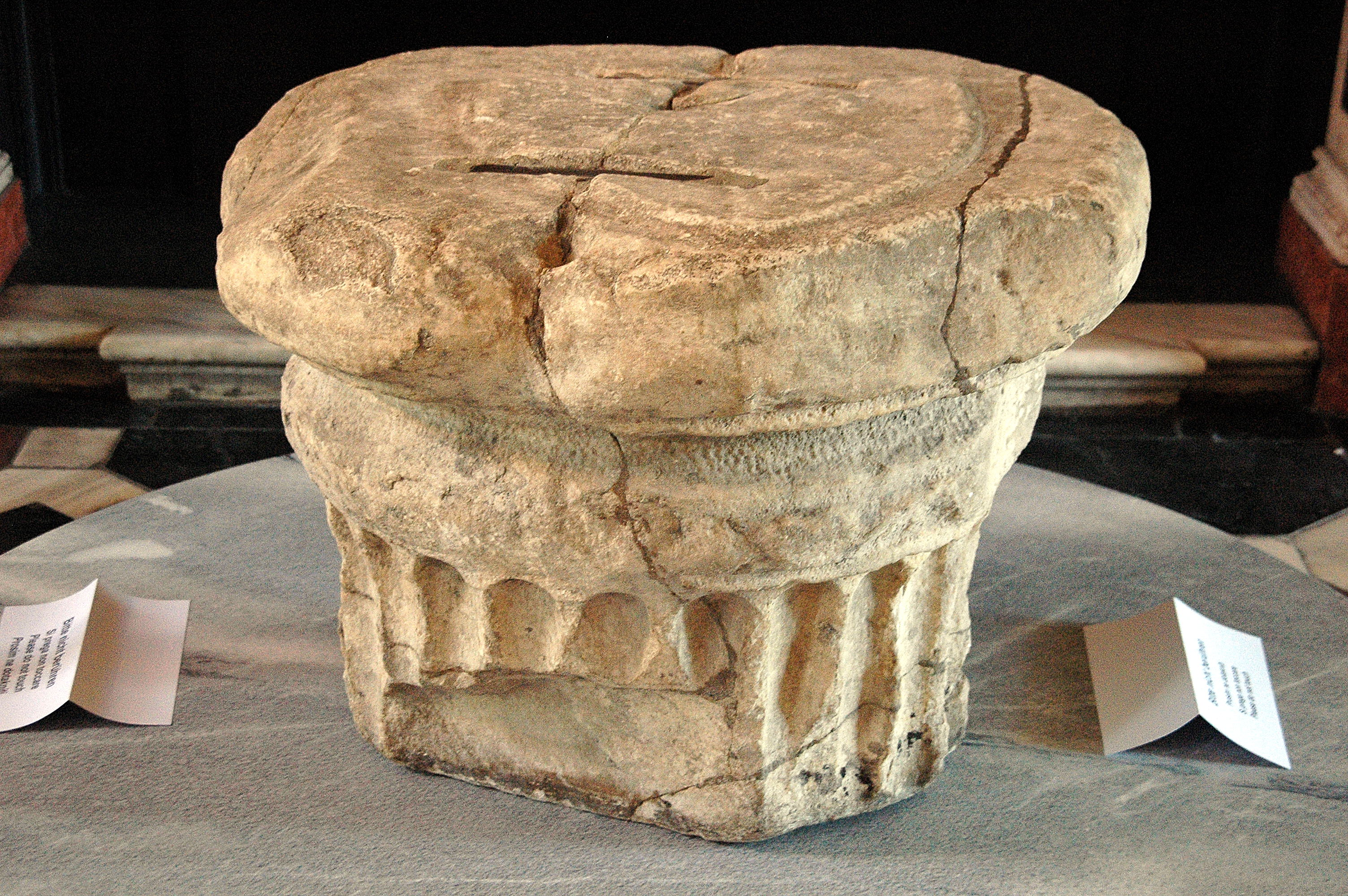
Prince's Stone (Knežji kamen)

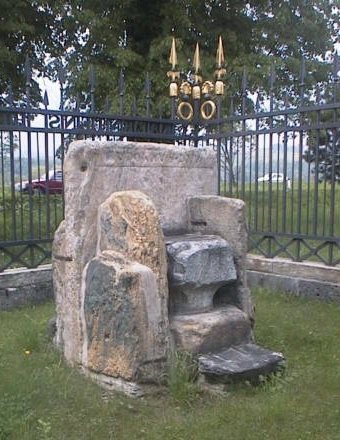
Duke's Chair (Vojvodski prestol)

The Austrian part of the former duchy today forms the federal state of Carinthia (German: Land Kärnten), while the area that was ceded to Italy as a part of the claimed "Julian March" belongs to the autonomous region of Friuli-Venezia Giulia. Most of the area awarded to Yugoslavia (cf. Slovenian Carinthia) now forms part of the larger Carinthia Statistical Region in Slovenia.

== Area and population ==
Area:

- Total: 10,327 km^{2} (3,987 sq mi)

Population (1910 Census):

- Total: 396,228

=== Linguistic composition ===
According to the last Austrian Imperial census of 1910, the Duchy of Carinthia was composed of the following linguistic communities:

Total: 396,228

- German: 304,315 (76.80%)
- Slovene: 82,212 (20.75%)
- Italian: 82 (0.02%)
- Other languages or foreigners: 9,619 (2.43%)

The Austrian censuses did not count ethnic groups, nor the mother tongue, but the "language of daily interaction" (Umgangssprache).

=== Religious composition ===
Total: 396,228

- Roman Catholics: 371,361 (93.72%)
- Protestants: 24,299 (6.13%)
- Jewish: 341 (0.09%)
- Other religions or unknown: 227 (0.06%)

== Dukes of Carinthia ==
=== Various dynasties ===
Luitpoldings

- Berthold I (927–938)
- Henry I (976–978)

Salian dynasty

- Otto I (978–985)

Luitpoldings

- Henry I (985–989), again, Duke of Bavaria 983–985

Ottonian dynasty

- Henry II, Duke of Bavaria (989–995), also Duke of Bavaria 985–995
- Henry II, Holy Roman Emperor (995–1002), also Duke of Bavaria 995–1005

Salian dynasty

- Otto I (1002–1004), again
- Conrad I (1004–1011)

House of Eppenstein

- Adalbero/Albert I (1011–1035)

Salian dynasty

- Conrad II (1036–1039)
- Henry III, Holy Roman Emperor (1039–1047), also Duke of Bavaria 1026–1041 and Holy Roman Emperor 1046–1056

Elder House of Welf

- Welf (1047–1055)

Ezzonids

- Conrad III (1056–1061)

House of Zähringen

- Berthold II (1061–1077)

House of Eppenstein

- Luitpold (1077–1090)
- Henry III (1090–1122)

=== House of Sponheim ===
The Carinthian ducal coat of arms until 1246

The Carinthian coat of arms from 1246

- Henry IV (1122–1123)
- Engelbert (1123–1134)
- Ulrich I (1134–1144)
- Henry V (1144–1161)
- Herman (1161–1181)
- Ulrich II (1181–1201)
- Bernhard (regent from 1199, duke 1202–1256)
- Ulrich III (1256–1269)

=== Various dynasties ===
Přemyslid dynasty

- Otakar/Otto II (1269–1276), also King of Bohemia 1253–1278

House of Habsburg

- Rudolph I (1276–1286), also King of Germany 1273–1291

=== Gorizia-Tyrol ===
- Meinhard (1286–1295)
- Henry VI (1295–1335), also King of Bohemia 1306/1307–1310, jointly with his brothers
  - Louis (1295–1305)
  - Otto III (1295–1310)

=== House of Habsburg ===
- Otto IV (1335–1339), jointly with his brother
  - Albert II (1335–1358)
- Frederick Ι (1358–1362), jointly with his brother
  - Rudolph II (1358–1365)
- Albert III (1365–1379)

==== Leopoldian line ====
  - Leopold (1379–1386)
  - William (1386–1406)
- Ernest (1406–1424)
- Frederick ΙΙ (1424–1493)

==== Habsburg territories reunified in 1458 ====
- Maximilian (1493–1519), also Holy Roman Emperor 1508–1519
- Charles I (1519–1558), also Holy Roman Emperor 1519–1556
- Ferdinand I (1521–1564), also Holy Roman Emperor 1558–1564

==== Inner Austrian Habsburgs ====
- Charles II (1564–1590)
- Ferdinand II (1590–1637), also Holy Roman Emperor 1619–1637

Carinthia was unified with the rest of the Habsburg territories again in 1619. See List of rulers of Austria

== See also ==
- Carantania
- Carantanians
- Carinthian Slovenes
- History of Austria
- History of Slovenia
- Black panther (symbol)

== Notes and references ==
- Kärnten (Religious population data is inaccurate)
