= Otakars =

Ruling dynasty of the March (later Duchy) of Styria from 1056 to 1192

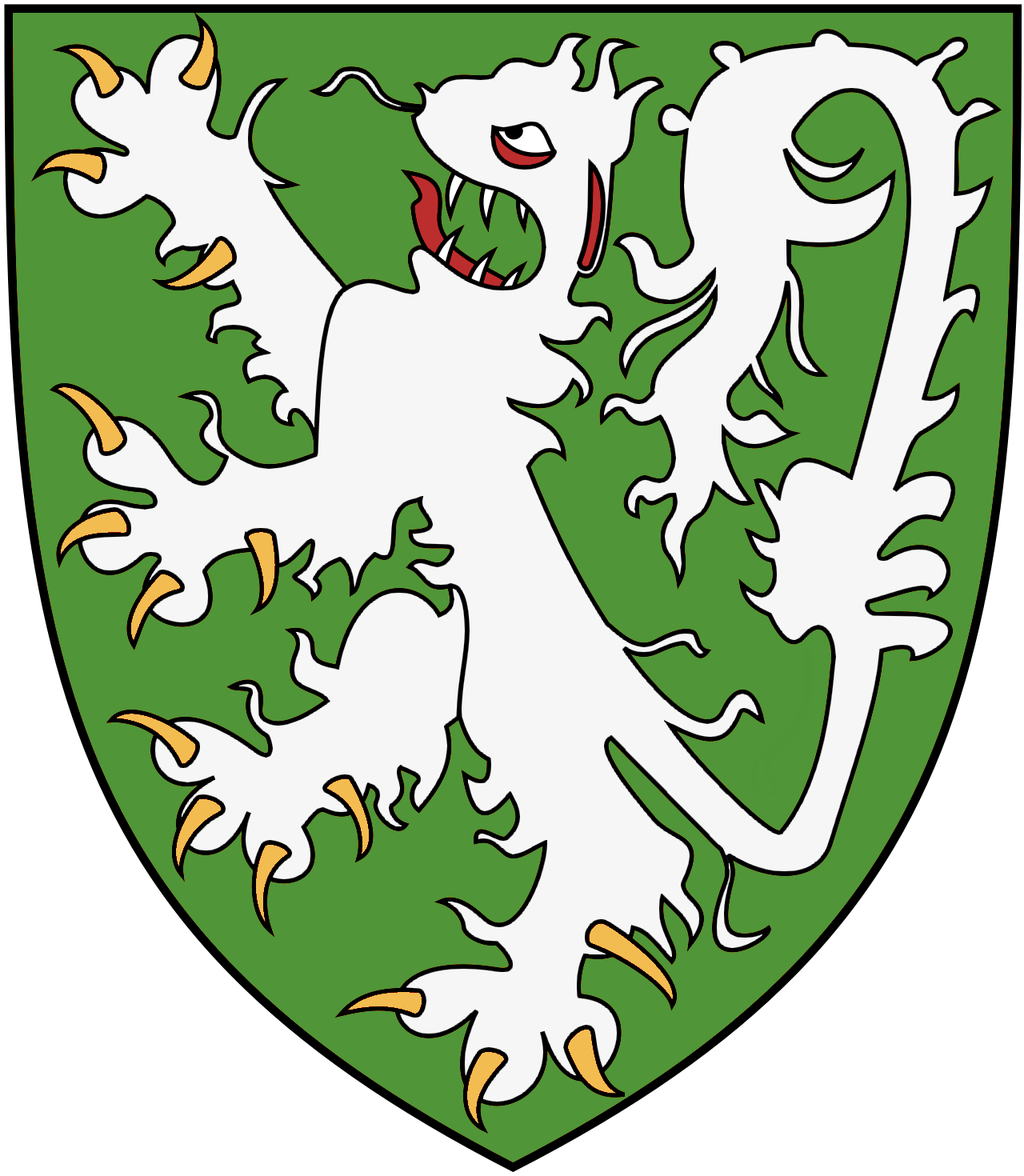
Coat of Arms of the Otakar dynasty

The Otakars (or von Traungaus, or Traungauer) were a medieval dynasty ruling the Imperial March of Styria (later the Duchy of Styria) from 1056 to 1192.

== History ==
The dynasty began with Otakar I, probably a son or son-in-law of Aribo (c. 850 – 909), margrave in Pannonia under King Arnulf. Otakar was Count of Steyr in the Traungau, in what is today Upper Austria. Together with Margrave Luitpold, he may have been killed at the 907 Battle of Pressburg. His descendant Ottokar I (died 1064), Count in the Chiemgau, became ruler of the Carantanian march in 1056.

The Carantanian march, then subject to the Duchy of Carinthia, was subsequently named March of Styria (German: Steiermark) after the dynasty's original seat at Steyr. In 1180 Margrave Ottokar IV gained the ducal title from Emperor Frederick I Barbarossa, thereby establishing the Duchy of Styria. The reign of the Otakars however ended with the extinction of the line upon Duke Ottokar's death in 1192. In the Georgenberg Pact of 1186 he had agreed that his lands should pass to Leopold V, the Babenberg duke of Austria.

== See also ==
- March of Styria
- Ottokar (disambiguation)
