= Ottokar II of Styria =

Margrave of Styria

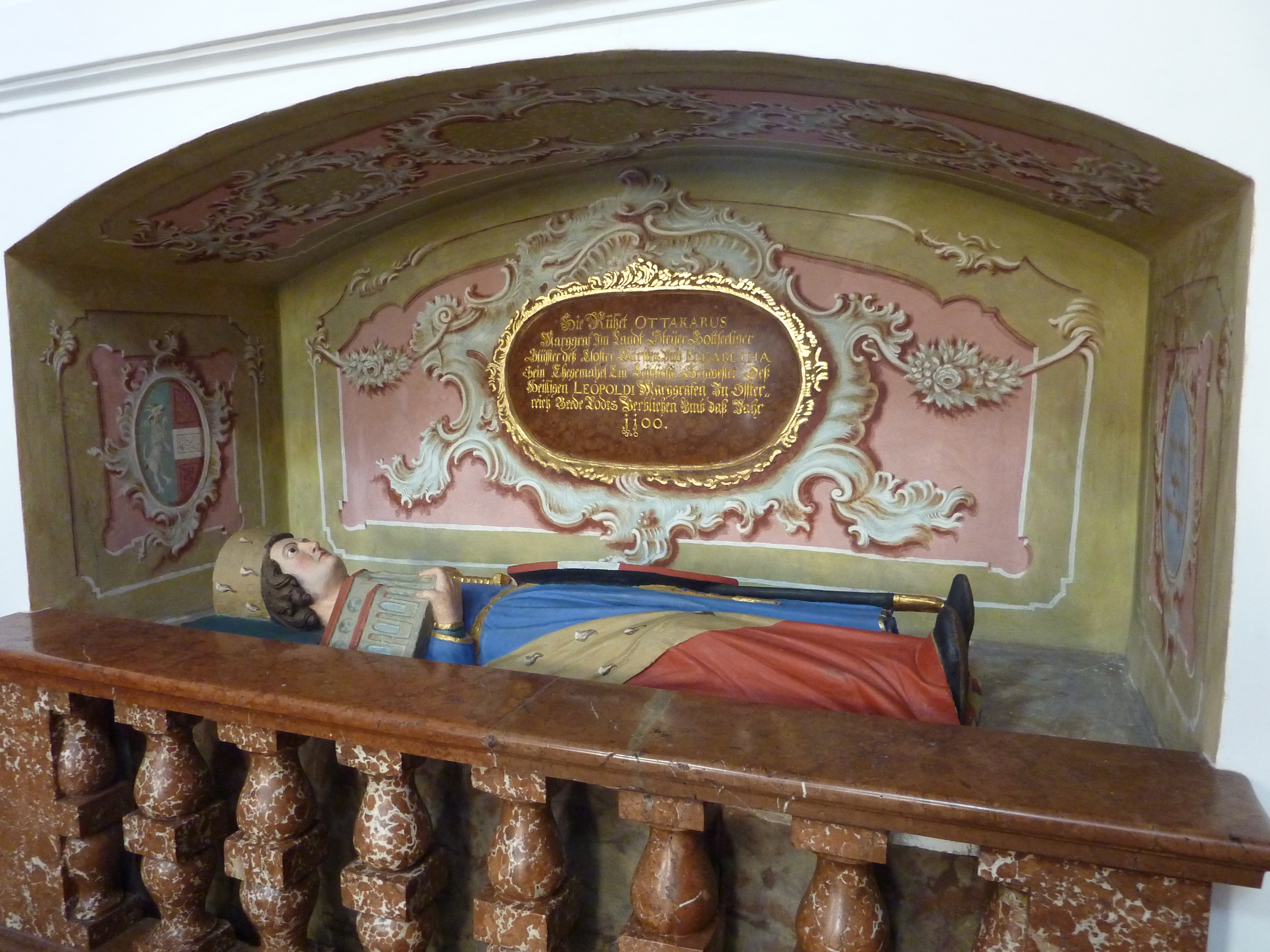
Statue of Ottokar II in Garsten Abbey, (Austria)

Ottokar II (died 28 November 1122) was Margrave of Styria.

He was the son of Ottokar I and grandfather of Ottokar III, from the dynasty of the Otakars. In the investiture dispute, he sided with the pope, which resulted in a battle with his brother Adalbero, who sided with the emperor, but died in 1086 or 1087. After the Eppensteiner dynasty went extinct, Ottokar inherited their possessions in the Mur and Mürz valleys. He founded the Benedictine monastery in Garsten (Upper Austria) in 1108.

== Family and children ==
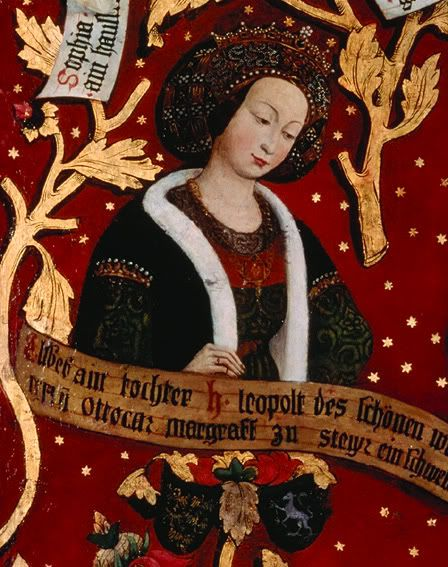
Elisabeth of Austria, Margravine of Styria

Ottokar II was married in 1090 to Elisabeth, daughter of Leopold II of Austria and Ida of Formbach-Ratelnberg. They had:

1. Leopold the Strong.
2. Kunigunde (died 28 July 1161), married to Bernhard, Count of Sponheim-Marburg.
3. Willibirg (died 18 January 1145), married to Ekbert II, Count of Formbach-Pitten.

== Sources ==
- Rainer, Johann (1981). Storia e vita culturale in Austria (in Italian). Bulzoni.

| Preceded by Adalbero | Margrave of Styria; 1082–1122 | Succeeded by Leopold the Strong |
