= Eppenstein =

Location in Styria, Austria

- Former municipality
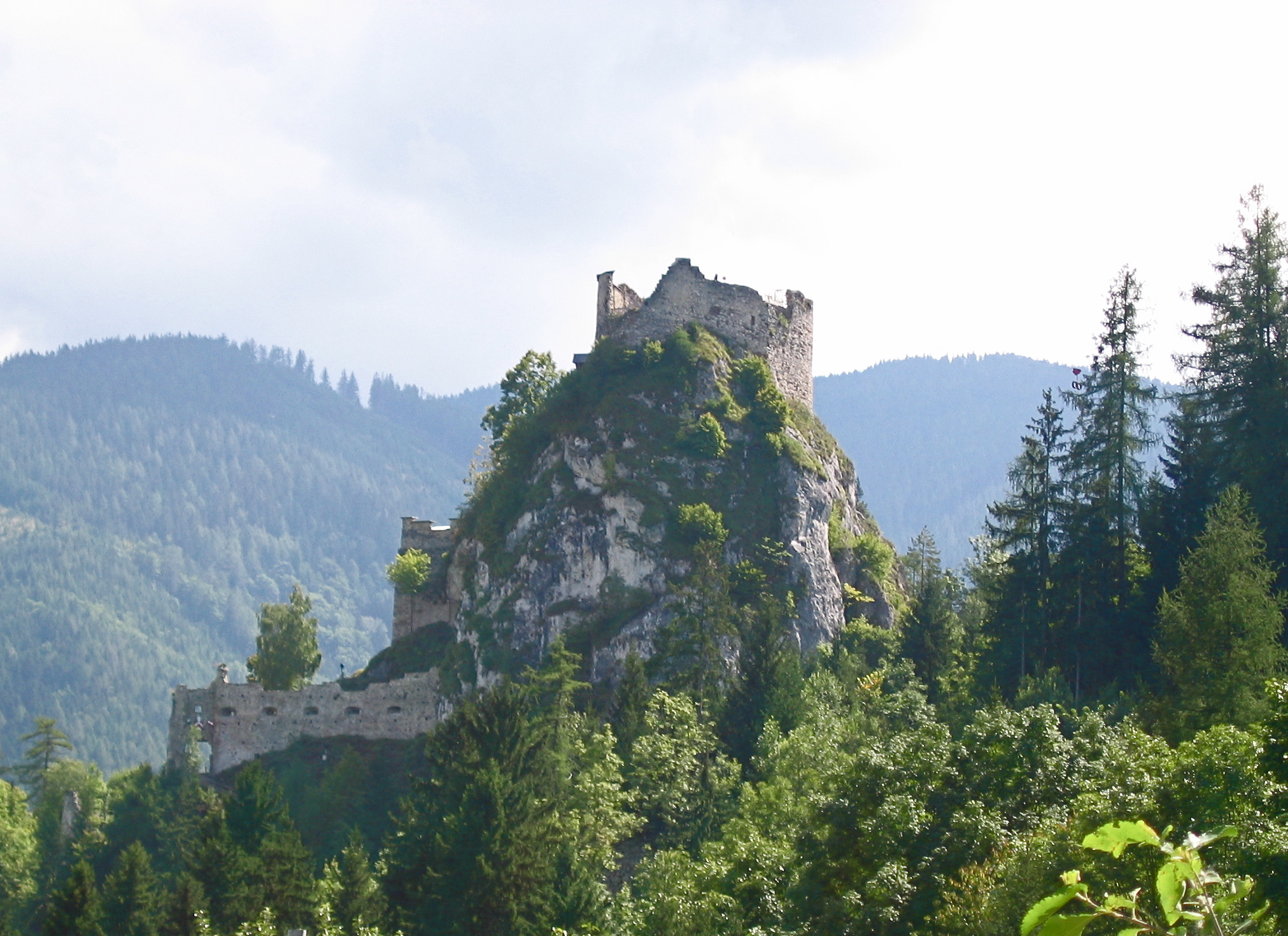
- Eppenstein Castle

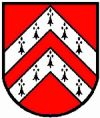
- Coat of arms

- Location within Austria
- Coordinates: 47°07′51″N 14°44′22″E
- Country: Austria
- State: Styria
- District: Murtal

Area
  - Total: 57.53 km^{2} (22.21 sq mi)
- Elevation: 736 m (2,415 ft)

Population (1 January 2016)
  - Total: 1,217
  - Density: 21.15/km^{2} (54.79/sq mi)
- Time zone: UTC+1 (CET)
  - Summer (DST): UTC+2 (CEST)
- Postal code: 8741
- Area code: 0 35 77
- Vehicle registration: JU
- Website: www.eppenstein. steiermark.at

Eppenstein is a former municipality in the district of Murtal in the Austrian state of Styria. Since the 2015 Styria municipal structural reform, it is part of the municipality Weißkirchen in Steiermark.

== Geography ==
Eppenstein lies in the Lavanttal Alps stretching along the narrow valley of the Granitzenbach creek, which runs from the Upper Mur valley in the north up to the Obdach Saddle pass and the Lavant Valley valley in Carinthia. The former municipal area comprised the cadastral communities of Mühldorf, Schoberegg, and Schwarzenbach.

== History ==
Eppenstein is known for the medieval Eppenstein Castle, built about 1000 AD by the Eppenstein margravial dynasty, who temporarily ruled as Dukes of Carinthia in the 11th and 12th centuries. Later held by Habsburg ministeriales like the Graben von Stein family, it was rebuilt in a Gothic style around 1478. Today only ruins remain.
