= Ulrich II of Carinthia =

Ulrich II of Spanheim
- Duke of Carinthia
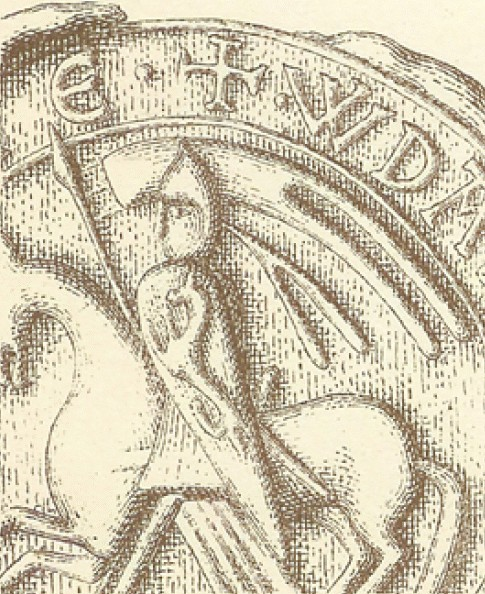
- Seal of Duke Ulrich II of Carinthia
- Duke: 1181–1202
- Predecessor: Herman, Duke of Carinthia
- Successor: Bernhard von Spanheim
- Born: c. 1176
- Died: 10 August 1202
- Noble family: House of Sponheim
- Father: Herman, Duke of Carinthia
- Mother: Agnes of Austria

Ulrich II (r. 1181 – 10 August 1202), a member of the House of Sponheim, was duke of Carinthia from 1181 until his death. He was one of the noble Germans who took part in the Crusade of 1197.

== Life ==
Ulrich II was the eldest son of Duke Herman of Carinthia and Agnes of Austria, a former queen of Hungary. Still a minor when his father died in 1181, he initially was under guardianship of his maternal uncle Duke Leopold V of Austria. Therefore, he had to stand back when the Otakar rulers of Styria became extinct and Leopold concluded the 1186 Georgenberg Pact with Ottokar IV in order to reserve the right of succession for the Austrian House of Babenberg. His paternal uncle was Pellegrino of Ortenburg-Spanheim, who ruled as patriarch of Aquileia from 1195 to 1204. In 1192 he made a donation to St. Paul's Abbey.

Ulrich II came of age to rule independently from 1194 and, like his father, remained a loyal supporter of the Imperial Hohenstaufen dynasty. When Emperor Henry VI called for the German Crusade in 1195, the Carinthian duke was among the many nobles who undertook to go, even though he had scarcely reached adulthood. Starting in March 1197 these nobles with their troops left from the south of Italy and Sicily. The main fleet reached Acre in September 1197. The crusade ended after the fall of Sidon and Beirut. Henry VI died of a fever in Messina in October 1197. When they heard the news many of the higher-ranking nobles returning to Germany to protect their interests in the forthcoming Imperial election.

Having returned to Germany, Ulrich participated in the election of Philip of Swabia in 1198. However, he fell ill shortly afterwards and became incapable of ruling, whereafter his younger brother Bernhard acted as regent. There is a record of the duke making another donation to Saint George's Abbey on 31 March 1199. According to the necrology of Seckau Abbey, Ulrich died on 12 August 1202.

Ulrich II of Carinthia House of Sponheim Born: c. 1176 Died: 10 August 1202
Preceded by Herman	Duke of Carinthia; 1181-1202	Succeeded by Bernhard
