= Herman II of Carinthia =

Duke of Carinthia

Herman II of Spanheim
- Duke of Carinthia
- Duke: 1161–1181
- Predecessor: Henry V, Duke of Carinthia
- Successor: Ulrich II, Duke of Carinthia
- Died: 4 October 1181
- Buried: Saint Paul's Abbey, Lavanttal
- Noble family: House of Sponheim
- Spouse: Agnes of Austria
- Issue: Ulrich II, Duke of Carinthia; Bernhard, Duke of Carinthia
- Father: Ulrich I, Duke of Carinthia
- Mother: Judith of Baden

Herman II of Spanheim (died 4 October 1181), a scion of the Rhenish House of Sponheim, was Duke of Carinthia from 1161 until his death.

== Family ==
He was the second son of Duke Ulrich I of Carinthia (d. 1144) and his wife Judith of Zähringen, daughter of Margrave Herman II of Baden.

== Rule ==
In April 1144 Duke Ulrich I died, Herman's elder brother Henry V succeeded him. He married Elizabeth, a daughter of Margrave Leopold of Styria, and died childless on 12 October 1161, whereafter Herman succeeded him as Carinthian duke.

Herman reached the confirmation of his rule by Emperor Frederick Barbarossa. In December 1161 he was solemnly enthroned on the Duke's Chair in the Zollfeld plain, in the presence of Archbishop Eberhard of Salzburg and Patriarch Ulrich II of Aquileia. In 1162 he accompanied the emperor on his campaign to Italy and the failed meeting with King Louis VII of France.

With varying degrees of success he tried to consolidate his position in Carinthia by achieving the office of a Vogt protector over the Diocese of Gurk as well as over the Carinthian possessions of the Bishopric of Bamberg and the Patriarchate of Aquileia. Like his brother, he was stuck in territorial disputes with the Otakar margraves of Styria and local nobles like the counts of Heunburg and Ortenburg. Upon the death of his uncle Margrave Engelbert III of Istria in 1173, Herman could not assume the margravial title, but inherited his personal possessions around the town of Sankt Veit which emerged as ducal residence.

About 1173, Herman married Agnes of Babenberg, daughter of Duke Henry II of Austria and widow of King Stephen III of Hungary. They had two known sons:

- Ulrich II, Duke of Carinthia (c. 1181–1202)
- Bernhard, Duke of Carinthia (c. 1181–1256).

Herman was the first Sponheim duke to be buried in St. Paul's Abbey in the Lavanttal, established by his great-grandfather Count Engelbert of Spanheim in 1091. He was succeeded by his eldest son Ulrich II.

== Notes ==
Herman II of Carinthia House of Sponheim Died: 4 October 1181
Preceded by Henry V	Duke of Carinthia; 1161-1181	Succeeded by Ulrich II
