= St. Veit an der Glan =

- Municipality
- Market place

- Coat of arms

- Location within Austria
- Coordinates: 46°46′N 14°22′E
- Country: Austria
- State: Carinthia
- District: Sankt Veit an der Glan

Government
  - Mayor: Gerhard Mock (SPÖ)

Area
  - Total: 50.79 km^{2} (19.61 sq mi)
- Elevation: 482 m (1,581 ft)

Population (2025) (Statistik Austria)
  - Total: 12,234
  - Density: 240.9/km^{2} (623.9/sq mi)
- Time zone: UTC+1 (CET)
  - Summer (DST): UTC+2 (CEST)
- Postal code: 9300
- Area code: 04212
- Website: www.stveit.carinthia.at

St. Veit an der Glan (Austrian German: [saŋkt ˈfaɪt an deːɐ̯ ˈɡlaːn]) is a town in the Austrian state of Carinthia, the administrative centre of the St. Veit an der Glan District. It served as the capital of the Duchy of Carinthia until 1518. The famous chef Wolfgang Puck was born there in 1949.

== Geography ==
=== Location ===
The town is situated in the valley of the Glan River within the Gurktal Alps. Here the Glan reaches the Central Carinthian Zollfeld plain and flows southwards to Maria Saal and the state capital Klagenfurt am Wörthersee.

=== Municipal arrangement ===
St. Veit consists of six Katastralgemeinden: Galling, Hörzendorf, Niederdorf, Projern, Sankt Donat and Tanzenberg. It is further divided into the following districts, with population figures at right:

- Affelsdorf (36)
- Aich (12)
- Altglandorf (105)
- Arndorf (15)
- Baardorf (12)
- Baiersdorf (20)
- Beintratten (16)
- Blintendorf (16)
- Dellach (44)
- Draschelbach (4)
- Eberdorf (10)
- Galling (4)
- Gersdorf (23)
- Höffern (0)
- Hörzendorf (371)
- Holz (6)
- Karlsberg (10)
- Karnberg (45)
- Laasdorf (7)
- Lebmach (1)
- Mairist (30)
- Milbersdorf (18)
- Muraunberg (65)
- Niederdorf (13)
- Pörtschach am Berg (30)
- Pflugern (19)
- Preilitz (17)
- Projern (56)
- Radweg (18)
- Raggasaal (8)
- Ritzendorf (12)
- St. Andrä (17)
- St. Donat (263)
- St. Veit an der Glan (11.220)
- Streimberg (5)
- Tanzenberg (17)
- Ulrichsberg (25)
- Unterbergen (106)
- Untermühlbach (100)
- Unterwuhr (35)
- Wainz (8)
- Zwischenbergen (0)

== History ==
Several archaeologic findings suggest a settlement in the area already in Carolingian times. According to legend, a 901 battle of Bavarian forces against invading Magyars instigated the founding of the town. As first mentioned in an 1131 deed, a Saint Vitus Church of the Roman Catholic Diocese of Gurk was located here within the Duchy of Carinthia. According to an 1137 agreement, it was "repurchased" by the Bishopric of Bamberg.

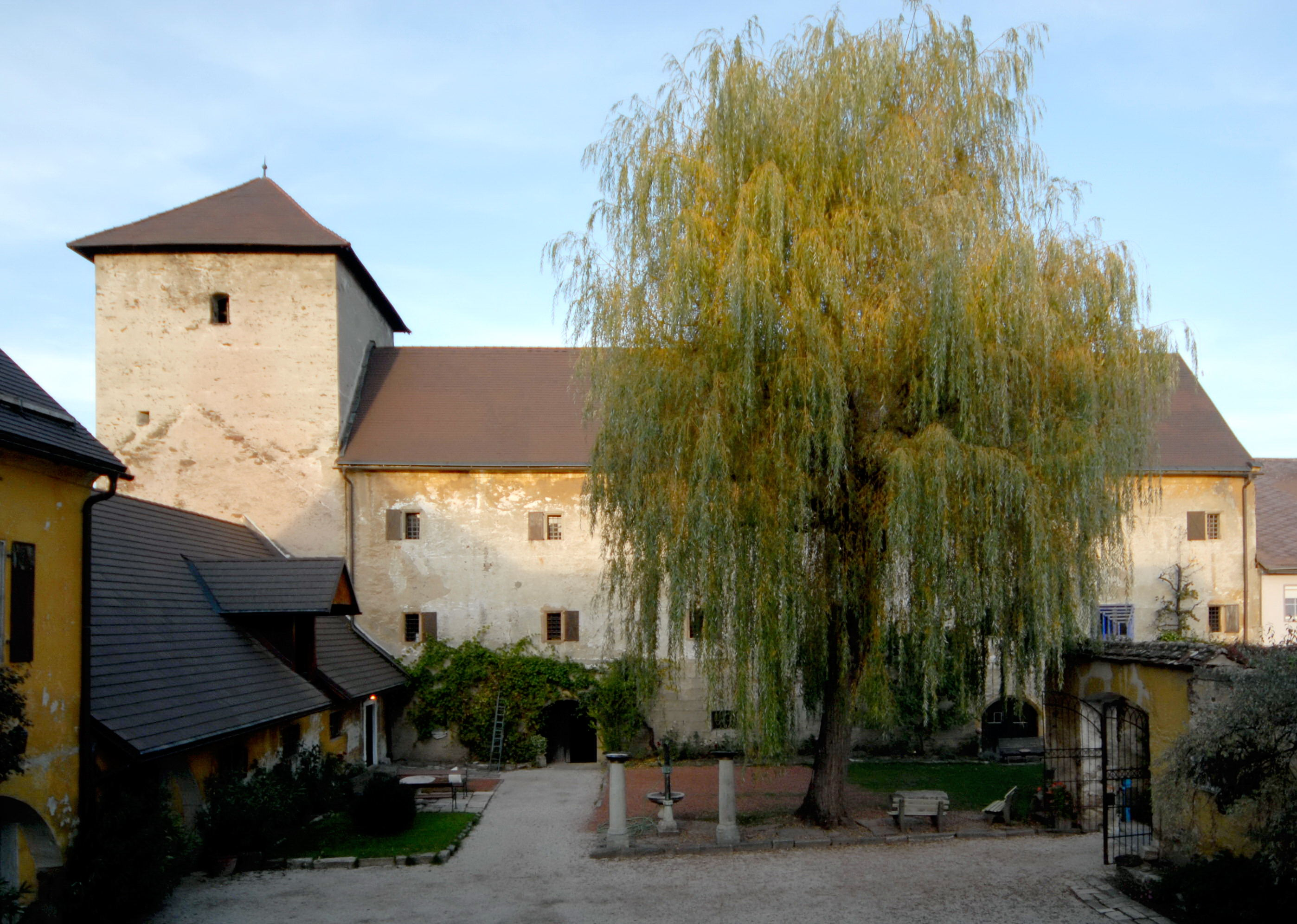
Ducal castle

However, already in 1149 it served as a residence of the Sponheim duke Heinrich V of Carinthia, where he received King Konrad III of Germany on his way back from the Second Crusade. He was succeeded by his brother Duke Hermann II of Carinthia, who became Vogt protector of the church in 1176 and subsequently the Sponheimer made the estates of St. Veit their permanent residence and capital of the Carinthian duchy, which it remained until 1518. Herman's son Bernhard von Spanheim (d. 1256) had the ducal castle and fortifications built, and granted St. Veit town privileges 1224. Here he held a glamorous court and received minnesingers like Walther von der Vogelweide, who stayed here in 1214, and Ulrich von Liechtenstein. St. Veit also may have been the domicile of Heinrich von dem Türlin where he wrote his Middle High German Diu Crône poem.

After the House of Sponheim had become extinct in 1269, the Carinthian duchy was acquired by King Otakar II of Bohemia, later it passed to the Meinhardiner Count Meinhard II of Tyrol. His granddaughter Countess Margaret in 1335 finally lost Carinthia to Duke Rudolf IV of Austria from the House of Habsburg, whereafter it was incorporated into the dynasty's Inner Austrian lands and ruled by stadtholders. In 1362 Rudolf granted the St. Veit citizens the permission to hold the annual Wiesenmarkt fair, which is arranged up to today as one of the oldest festivals in Central Europe. Its town hall dates from 1468 and the present-day ducal castle from the 15th to 16th century.

== Demographics ==
At the 2001 census, it had a population of 12,045. Of that, 92.5% are Austrian, 2.3% are South Slavic, and 2.2% are Bosnian. 74.0% of the population profess themselves to be Roman Catholic, 8.6% are Lutherans/Protestants and 4.3% are Muslims, while 10.2% are without religious confession.

In 2025 the population was 12,234.

== Politics ==
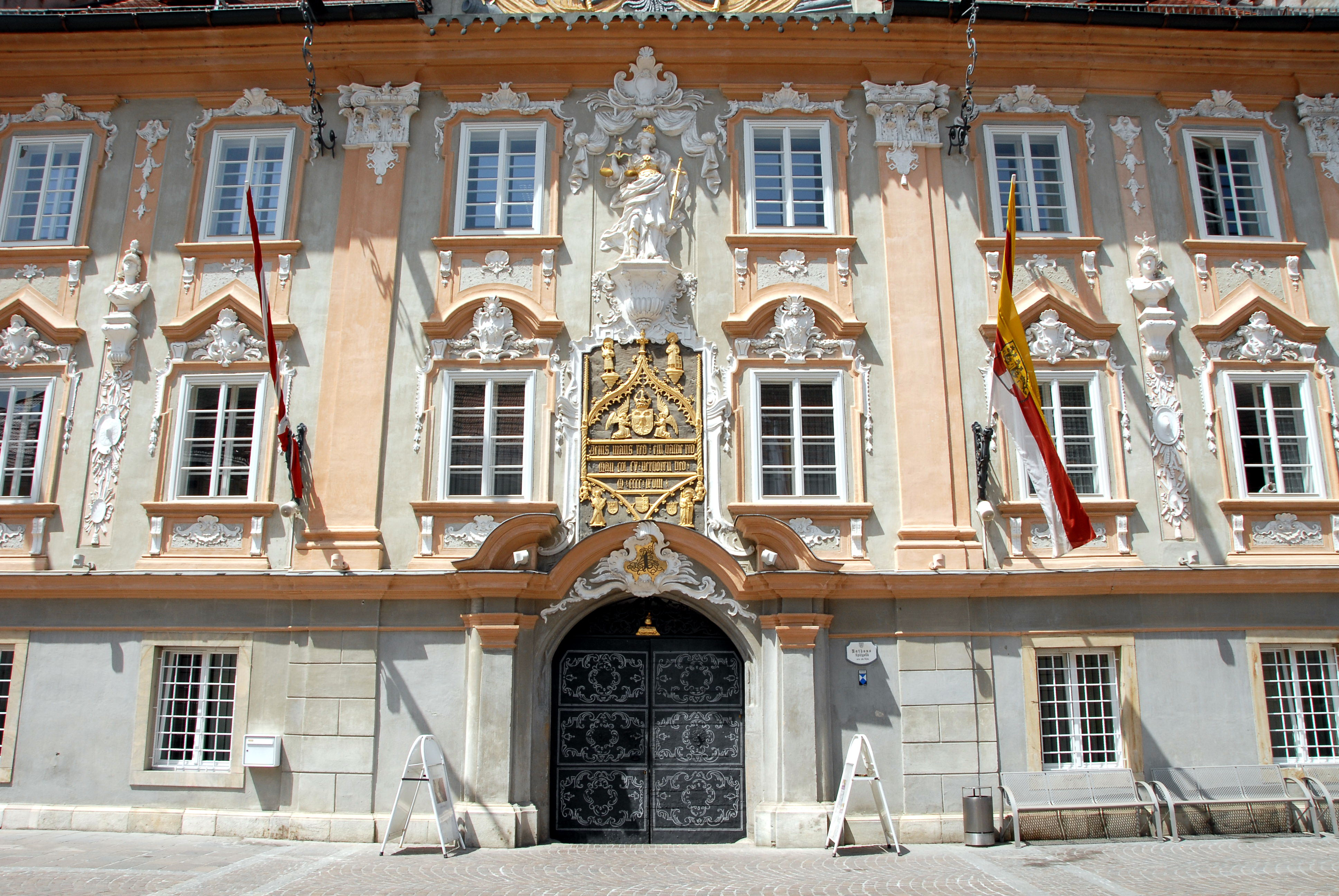
Town hall

The town council is made up of 31 members. They are of the following parties:

- 21 SPÖ
- 5 ÖVP
- 4 FPÖ
- 1 Greens

The mayor is Gerhard Mock (SPÖ).

== Industry ==
The town is home to the Jacques Lemans GmbH, an international watch and jewelry company.

== Literature ==
"Sankt Veit an der Glan: Eine Stadtgeographie", doctoral thesis, Graz, 1965, by H. Pressinger.

"Der Bezirk Sankt Veit an der Glan, seine Kunstwerke, historische Lebens -und Siedlungsformen" 1977, by S. Hartwagner.

== Sports ==
St. Veit an der Glan is home to SC St. Veit, which currently plays in the 5th tier Unterliga Ost, they play their home matches at the Jacques Lemans Arena.

== International relations ==
=== Entente Florale ===
St. Veit an der Glan has participated in the international horticultural competition Entente Florale, and won silver medal in 1999

=== Twin towns - Sister cities ===
St. Veit is twinned with:

- Haltern, Germany

== Notable people ==
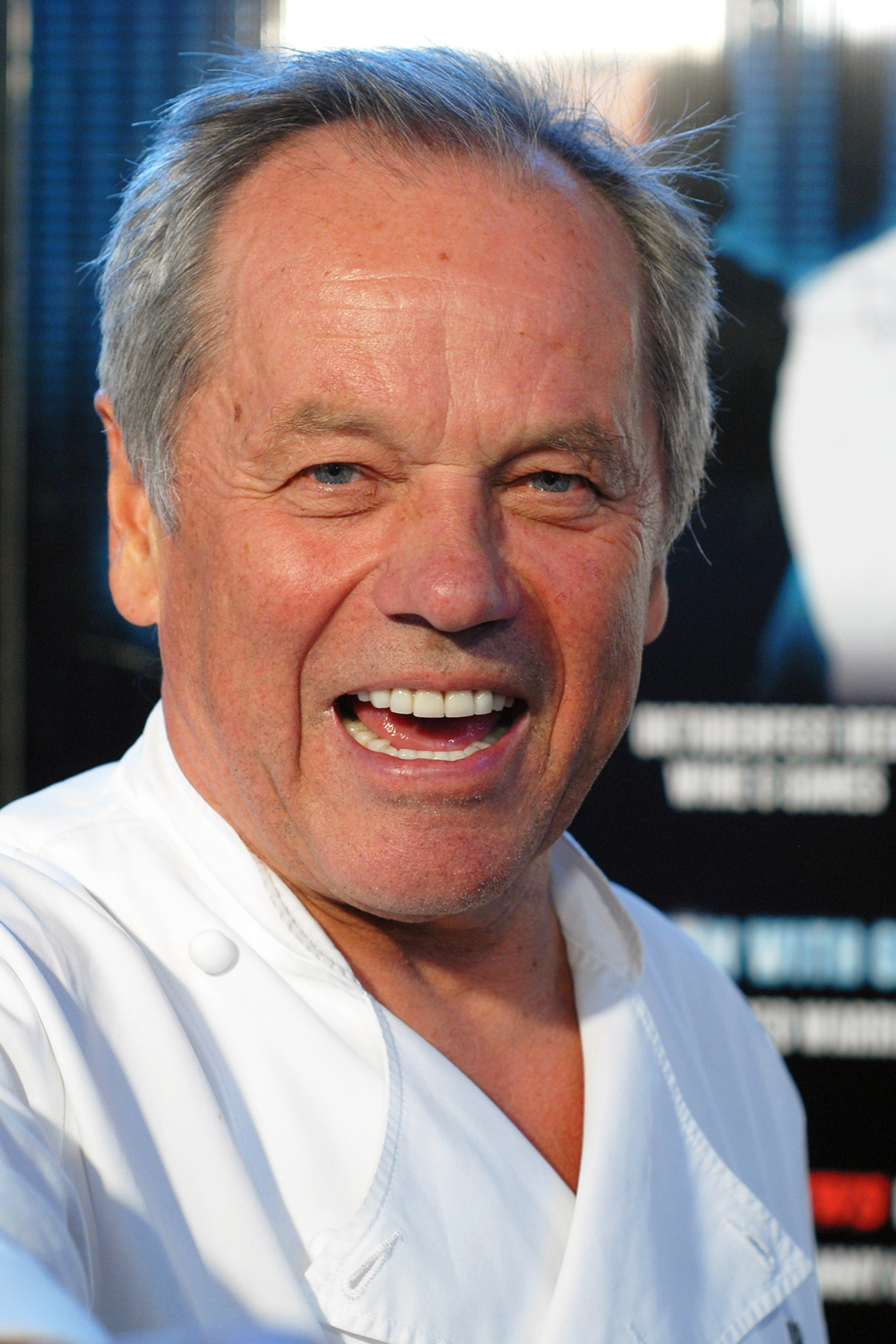
Wolfgang Puck, 2012

- August Prinzhofer (1816–1885), an Austrian painter and lithographer.
- Wolfgang Puck (born 1949), an Austrian-American chef and restaurateur.

=== Sport ===
- Franz Wohlfahrt (born 1964), an Austrian football goalkeeper who has played 502 games and 59 for Austria.
- Manuel Kerhe (born 1987), an Austrian footballer who has played over 400 games
- Magdalena Lobnig (born 1990), an Austrian rower and bronze medallist at the 2020 Summer Olympics
- Matthias Mayer (born 1990), a retired World Cup alpine ski racer and three time Olympic gold medallist
- Michael Novak (born 1990), an Austrian footballer who played has over 330 games
- Martin Hinteregger (born 1992), an Austrian footballer who has played 346 games and 67 for Austria
