= Henry V of Carinthia =

Duke of Carinthia

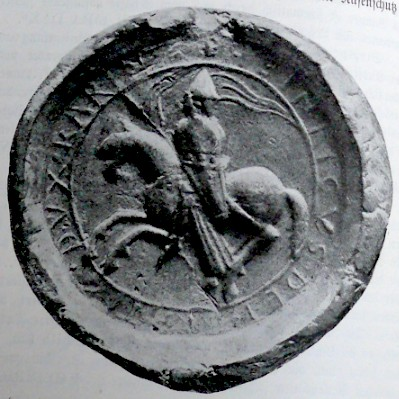
Seal of Henry V

Henry V (died 12 October 1161), of the House of Spanheim, was the margrave of Verona from 1144 until 1151 and the duke of Carinthia from 1144 to his death. According to the contemporary chronicler Otto of Freising, Henry was "a valiant man, experienced in the councils of war" (fortem et exercitatum in bellicis consiliis virum).

Henry was the eldest son of Duke Ulrich I and Judith, daughter of Margrave Hermann II of Baden. He married Elizabeth, widow of Count Rudolf II of Stade and daughter of Margrave Leopold of Styria, but their marriage was childless. He succeeded his father while still a youth. In 1147 his rich uncle, Count Bernard of Trixen, bequeathed his allods and his ministeriales (high-status serfs) in Carinthia and in the Styrian Mark an der Drau to Margrave Ottokar III of Styria.

In 1151 another uncle, Hermann III of Baden, was invested with the march of Verona, which had been held by the dukes of Carinthia since 976. Henry is not known to have objected to the loss of this large territory in northern Italy. In 1158 Bishop Roman I of Gurk granted the bailiwick (secular protection) of his diocese to Henry, but this was a small gain for a prince whose territory was dominated by estates with non-resident lords both ecclesiastical and secular. Henry took part in the wars of the Emperor Frederick I in northern Italy in 1154–55 and 1158–60. Otto of Freising lists him among the most distinguished who returned home with the emperor's permission in mid-1155. Otto's continuator, Rahewin, reports that during the 1158 campaign, Henry and Duke Henry II of Austria were given command of the Hungarian contingent of 600 archers, with their "counts and barons", which marched through the Val Canale into the march of Verona, the route known as the via Canalis.

Henry was a member of the embassy Frederick sent to the Byzantine emperor Manuel I in 1160–61. Henry was probably sent because his uncle, Margrave Engelbert III of Istria was married to Matilda of Sulzbach, a sister of Manuel's wife, the Empress Irene. While returning, Henry drowned in the mouth of the Tagliamento river. His body was buried in the abbey of Rosazzo. He was succeeded by his brother, Hermann II.

== Sources ==
- Kosi, Miha (2001). "The Age of the Crusades in the South-East of the Empire (Between the Alps and the Adriatic)". In Hunyadi, Zsolt; Laszlovszky, József (eds.). The Crusades and the Military Orders: Expanding the Frontiers of Medieval Latin Christianity. Budapest: Central European University Medievalia. pp. 123–66.
- Moro, Gotbert (1969). "Heinrich V.". Neue Deutsche Biographie. Vol. 8. p. 361.
- Otto; Rahewin (1966). The Deeds of Frederick Barbarossa (2nd ed.). New York: W.W. Norton.
