= Leopold VI of Austria =

Duke of Austria from 1198 to 1230

Leopold VI
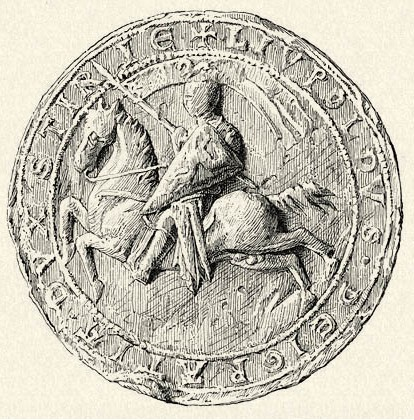
- Seal of Leopold VI

Duke of Austria
- Reign: 1198–1230
- Predecessor: Frederick I
- Successor: Frederick II

Duke of Styria
- Reign: 1194–1230
- Predecessor: Leopold I
- Successor: Frederick II
- Born: 15 October 1176
- Died: 28 July 1230; San Germano
- Burial: Lilienfeld Abbey
- Spouse: Theodora Angelina
- Issue: Margaret, Queen of Bohemia; Gertrude of Austria; Agnes of Austria; Leopold of Austria; Henry II, Duke of Mödling; Frederick II, Duke of Austria; Constance, Margravine of Meissen
- House: House of Babenberg
- Father: Leopold V
- Mother: Helena of Hungary

Leopold VI (15 October 1176 – 28 July 1230), known as Leopold the Glorious, was Duke of Styria from 1194 and Duke of Austria from 1198 to his death in 1230. He was a member of the House of Babenberg.

== Life ==
=== Early Years ===
Leopold VI was the younger son of Duke Leopold V and his wife, Helena of Hungary (daughter of Géza II of Hungary and Euphrosyne of Kiev). He was betrothed to the Damsel of Cyprus in 1193, but the marriage never took place.

In contravention of the provisions of the Georgenberg Pact, the Babenberg reign was divided after the death of Leopold V: Leopold VI's elder brother, Frederick I, was given the Duchy of Austria (corresponding roughly to modern Lower Austria and eastern Upper Austria), while Leopold VI himself became Duke of Styria. The duchies were reunified under Leopold VI when Frederick died after only four years of rule.

=== Crusade ===
Leopold VI participated in the Reconquista in Spain and in two crusades, the Albigensian Crusade in 1212 and the failed Fifth Crusade from 1217 to 1221, and—like his predecessors—attempted to develop the land by founding monasteries. His most important foundation is Lilienfeld in the Lower Austrian valley of the Traisen River, where he was buried after his death. Besides that, he supported the then highly modern mendicant Orders of the Franciscans and Dominicans. He elevated Enns to the status of a city in 1212, and Vienna in 1221, the territory of which was nearly doubled.

Under Leopold's rule, the Gothic style began to reach Austria - the Cappella Speciosa in his temporary residence of Klosterneuburg is known as the first building influenced by it in the Danube area - a reconstruction of it can be seen today in the palace gardens of Laxenburg.

Leopold's court is known as a center of the Minnesang, e.g., Walther von der Vogelweide, Neidhart von Reuental and Ulrich von Liechtenstein were active here. Also, the Nibelungenlied may have been written in his court.

=== Later Years ===
Babenbergian Austria reached the zenith of its prestige under Leopold's rule. Evidence of this is given by his marriage to the Byzantine princess Theodora Angelina and his attempt to end the War of the Keys by mediating between Holy Roman Emperor Frederick II and Pope Gregory IX. This is what he was working on when he died in 1230 at San Germano.

== Children ==
Leopold and Theodora Angelina had:

1. Margaret, Duchess of Austria (1204 – 29 October 1266), married Henry, the eldest son and heir presumptive of the Holy Roman Emperor Frederick II, then after he died, married King Ottokar II of Bohemia.
2. Agnes of Austria (19 February 1205 – 29 August 1226), married Albert I, Duke of Saxony
3. Leopold of Austria (1207–1216) died when he climbed a tree and fell at Klosterneuburg
4. Henry II, Duke of Mödling (1208 – 28 November 1228), married Agnes of Thuringia; their only daughter, Gertrudis, was the general heiress of the House of Babenberg after the death of her uncle
5. Gertrude of Austria (1210–1241), married Henry Raspe, Landgrave of Thuringia
6. Frederick II, Duke of Austria (25 April 1211 – 15 June 1246)
7. Constantia of Austria (6 April 1212 – 5 June 1243), married Henry III, Margrave of Meissen

== See also ==
- List of rulers of Austria
- List of Marshals of Austria

== Sources ==
- Beller, Steven (2007). A Concise History of Austria. New York: Cambridge University Press. ISBN 978-0521478861.
- Edbury, Peter W. (1994). The Kingdom of Cyprus and the Crusades, 1191-1374. Cambridge University Press.
- Haverkamp, Alfred (1988). Medieval Germany 1056-1273. Translated by Braun, Helga; Mortimer, Richard. Oxford University Press. ISBN 978-0-19-822131-9.
- Loud, Graham A.; Schenk, Jochen, eds. (2017). The Origins of the German Principalities, 1100-1350: Essays by German Historians. Routledge.
- Lyon, Jonathan R. (2013). Princely Brothers and Sisters: The Sibling Bond in German Politics, 1100-1250. Cornell University Press.
- O'Callaghan, Joseph F. (2004). Reconquest and Crusade in Medieval Spain. University of Pennsylvania Press.
- Parks, Annette P. (2016). "Rescuing the Maidens from the Tower: Recovering the Stories of Two Female Political Hostages". In Tuten, Belle S.; Billado, Tracey L. (eds.). Feud, Violence and Practice: Essays in Medieval Studies in Honor of Stephen D. White. Routledge.
- Riley-Smith, Jonathan (2005). The Crusades: A History (2nd ed.). Yale University Press.
- Runciman, Steven (2000). The Sicilian Vespers. Cambridge University Press.

Leopold VI of Austria House of Babenberg Born: 1176 Died: 1230
Regnal titles
Preceded by Frederick I	Duke of Austria; 1198–1230	Succeeded by Frederick II
Preceded by Leopold I	Duke of Styria; 1194–1230	Succeeded by Frederick II
