= Frederick of Austria =

Frederick of Austria (Friedrich I. von Österreich) may refer to:

- Frederick I of Austria (Babenberg) (c. 1175 – 1198), of the Babenberg family, duke from 1195 to 1198
- Frederick I of Austria (Habsburg) (c. 1289 – 1330) of the Habsburg family, duke from 1308 to 1330
- Frederick II of Austria (1211–1246), Babenberg duke
- Frederick III of Austria (1347–1362), Habsburg duke
- Frederick IV of Austria (1382–1439), Habsburg duke of the Tirol, son of Leopold III of Austria
- Frederick V of Austria (1415–1493), later Frederick III, Holy Roman Emperor
- Archduke Frederick, Duke of Teschen (1856–1936)
