= Helena of Hungary, Duchess of Austria =

Duchess consort of Austria from 1172 to 1194

Helena of Hungary
- Duchess consort of Austria
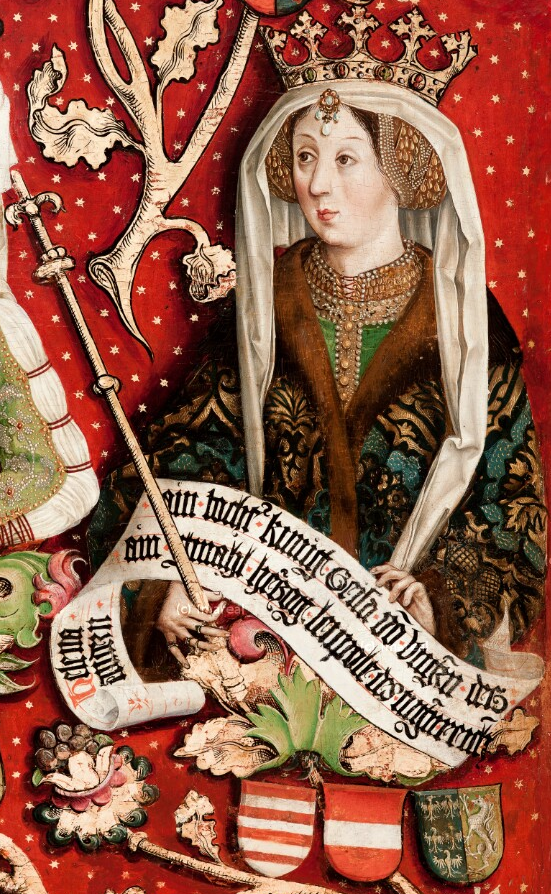
- Duchess Helena, Babenberger Stammbaum, Klosterneuburg Monastery
- Born: c. 1155
- Died: 25 December 1199
- Burial: Heiligenkreuz Abbey
- Spouse: Leopold V, Duke of Austria
- Issue: Frederick I Leopold VI; Agnes of Austria; Bertha of Austria
- House: Árpád
- Father: Géza II of Hungary
- Mother: Euphrosyne of Kiev

Helena (Ilona) of Hungary (c. 1155 – 25 December 1199), a member of the royal Árpád dynasty, was Duchess of Austria from 1177 and Styria from 1192 to 1194 by her marriage with the Babenberg duke Leopold V of Austria.

== Biography ==
Helena was the daughter of King Géza II of Hungary and his wife, Euphrosyne of Kiev, a daughter of Grand Prince Mstislav I of Kiev by his second wife, Liubava Dmitrievna. Little is known of her life or character. The only clear facts about her life are that at Pentecost 1174 she was married to Leopold V of Austria. The marriage reflected the westward orientation of the Hungarian House of Árpád in view of the expansionist politics of the Byzantine emperor Manuel I Komnenos. Leopold's sister Agnes had already married King Stephen III of Hungary, Helena's elder brother who had died in 1172.

Helena and Leopold had issue; he died on 31 December 1194 as a result of a horse accident. Helena died five years later in 1199 and was buried beside her husband in Heiligenkreuz Abbey.

== Marriage and children ==
By her marriage to Duke Leopold V, Helena had at least two (possibly as many as four) children:

- Frederick I (d. 16 April 1198)
- Leopold VI (d. 28 July 1230)
- ?Agnes
- ?Bertha
