= Pellegrinus I of Aquileia =

Pellegrinus I
- Patriarch of Aquileia
- Installed: 1130
- Term ended: 1161
- Predecessor: Gerardo
- Successor: Ulrico di Treven

Personal details
- Died: 8 August 1161 Udine

Pellegrinus I (Note: "Pellegrinus" is a latinisation of his Italian name, Pellegrino, which comes from the proper Latin form Peregrinus. This translates into both German and English as Pilgrim.) (died 8 August 1161), also called Pilgrim of Ortenburg, was Patriarch of Aquileia in northern Italy from 1130 to 1161.

Pellegrinus was a member of a noble family of Trentino, the lords of Povo. He was a younger son of Duke Ulrich I of Carinthia by his wife Judith of Baden. He was appointed Patriarch of Aquileia in 1130. He succeeded the Patriarch Gerardo (1122–1128). He was a faithful supporter of the emperors Conrad III and Frederick Barbarossa during their struggle against Rome. He reached an agreement of "peace and friendship" (pax et amicitia) with Archbishop Conrad I of Salzburg (died 1147) whereby the latter agreed to pay tithes to Aquileia for those properties which the archdiocese held in the patriarchate. (Note: The Vita Chuonradi archiepiscopi, a biography of Conrad, says that "at the time of the feast of Pentecost, [Conrad] with honour and fraternal charity called on the patriarch Pilgrim, [and] as if it were a gift of all his possessions which he had in the patriarchate, of his own accord gave the tithe and confirmed the privilege, and peace and friendship between himself and [Pilgrim] was constituted for perpetuity" (cum in festo pentecoste Pilgrimum patriarchum honoris pariter et fraternae caritatis gratia vocasset, quasi pro munere de omnibus possessionibus suis quas in patriarchatu habebat, ultro decimam dedit et privilegio confirmavit, et pacem atque amiciciam inter se et illum perpetuam constituit)) Conrad's example was followed by pledges to pay their tithes from the others present when the agreement was reached at Pentecost. In 1146 he intervened before Pope Eugene III in Brescia.

In 1150 he came into conflict with Engelberto, from the family of the Counts of Gorizia, who laid a claim against the assets of the church of Aquileia. Engelberto came to the meeting armed, and arrested Pellegrinus. However, under pressure from the other feudal lords Engelberto was forced to quickly release the patriarch.

In 1158 Pellegrinus attended the emperor Frederick Barbarossa in the Diet of Roncaglia, held near Piacenza. He was a leading figure in the synod of Pavia in 1160, where the Antipope Victor IV was recognized by some of the Cardinals, with the support of the imperial legate. Pellegrinus died on 8 August 1161. He was succeeded by the Patriarch Ulrico di Treven.
