= Maria of Bohemia =

12th-century Bohemian noblewoman

- Margravine of Austria; Duchess of Bavaria
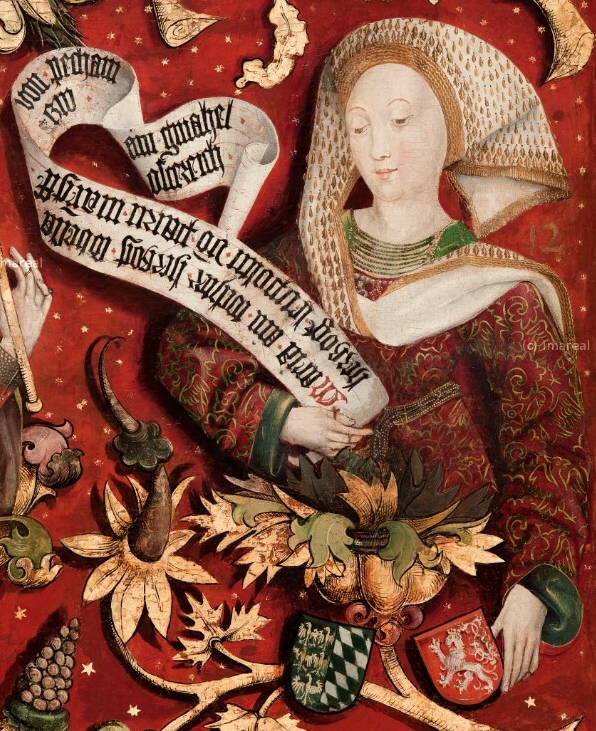
- Portrait in the Babenberg pedigree, Klosterneuburg Monastery
- Born: c. 1124
- Died: after 1172
- Buried: Backnang Abbey
- Noble family: Přemyslid dynasty
- Spouses: Leopold, Duke of Bavaria; Herman III, Margrave of Baden
- Issue: Gertrude of Baden
- Father: Soběslav I, Duke of Bohemia
- Mother: Adelaide of Hungary

Maria of Bohemia (c. 1124 – after 1172), a member of the Přemyslid dynasty, was Margravine of Austria and Duchess of Bavaria by her first marriage to Duke Leopold I, as well as Margravine of Baden and Verona by her second marriage to Margrave Herman III.

== Life ==
Maria was the only daughter of Duke Soběslav I of Bohemia and his wife Adelaide of Hungary, a granddaughter of King Géza I of Hungary. To strengthen the ties between the Bohemian and German nobility, her father married her off to the Babenberg margrave Leopold IV of Austria on 28 September 1138. The bride was in her early teens, and the groom was in his early 30s. The Bohemian-Austrian alliance was confirmed, when Leopold's younger sister Gertrude married Soběslav's nephew, Duke Vladislaus II of Bohemia, two years later.

In 1139, one year after Maria's marriage, the Hohenstaufen king Conrad III of Germany, having deposed the Welf duke Henry the Proud, enfeoffed the Duchy of Bavaria to the Babenberg dynasty, ruling the Margraviate of Austria since 976. Margrave Leopold was Conrad's half-brother by their mother Agnes of Waiblingen; the king may also had helped to arrange the dynastical ties with the Bohemian Přemyslids. Leopold took over the rule in Bavaria, he nevertheless had to face the claims raised by Henry's younger brother Welf VI.

Maria's first marriage lasted three years, ending with Leopold's unexpected death at Niederaltaich Abbey in 1141. As the marriage produced no heirs for Leopold, Austria and Bavaria were inherited by his elder brother, Duke Henry II.

One year later, she remarried to Margrave Herman III, who had been Margrave of Baden since 1130. Maria was his second wife. Herman participated in the Second Crusade and in 1151 he was vested with the March of Verona by King Conrad III. He remained a loyal supporter of the Hohenstaufen dynasty during the Italian campaigns of Conrad's successor Frederick Barbarossa.

Maria had the following children with Hermann:

- (?) Gertrude of Baden (d. before 1225), who married in 1180 Count Albrecht of Dagsburg (d. 1211).

Hermann died 16 January 1160. Maria disappeared from then although she may have been alive in 1172. She is buried at Backnang Abbey.

== Sources ==
- Lyon, Jonathan R. (2013). Princely Brothers and Sisters: The Sibling Bond in German Politics, 1100-1250. Cornell University Press.
- Vaníček V., Soběslav I. Přemyslovci v kontekstu evropských dějin v letech 1092-1140, Praha-Litomyšl 2007, s. 288-290.
