= Helena of Hungary =

Helena, Jelena or Ilona of Hungary may refer to:

- Helena of Hungary, Queen of Croatia (died c. 1091), daughter of King Béla I of Hungary and wife of King Demetrius Zvonimir of Croatia
- Helena of Serbia, Queen of Hungary (after 1109–after 1146), wife of King Béla II of Hungary
- Helena of Hungary, Duchess of Austria (c. 1158–1199), daughter of King Géza II of Hungary and wife of Leopold V, Duke of Austria
