= Ottokar IV of Styria =

Margrave (later Duke) of Styria from 1164 to 1192

Ottokar IV
- Duke of Styria
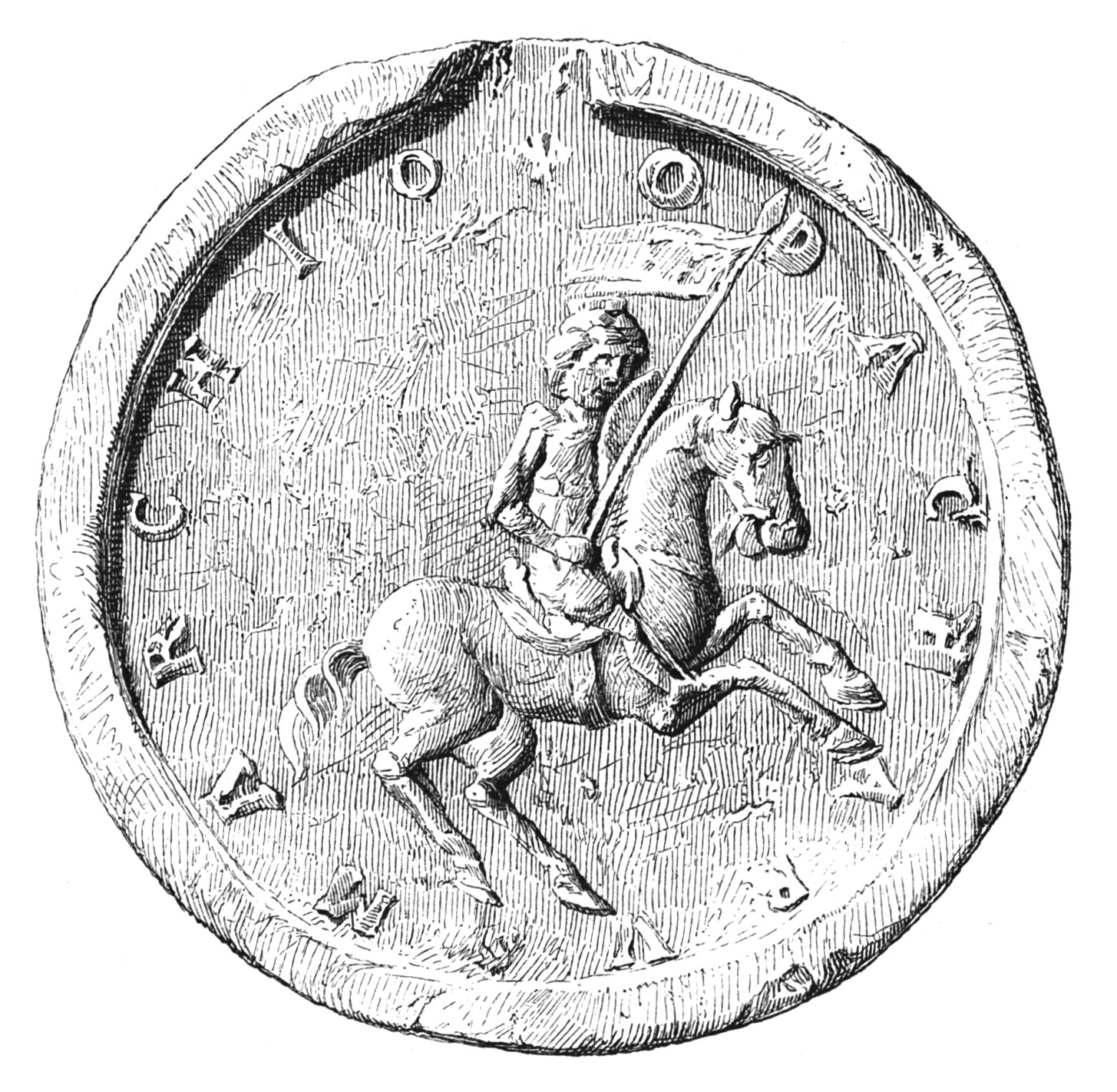
- Seal of Ottokar IV
- Margrave from 1180: Duke: 1164–1192
- Predecessor: Ottokar III
- Successor: Leopold V of Austria
- Born: 19 August 1163
- Died: 9 May 1192 (aged 28)
- Buried: Žiče Charterhouse (Seitz)
- Family: Otakars
- Father: Ottokar III of Styria
- Mother: Kunigunde of Vohburg

Ottokar IV (19 August 1163 – 8 May 1192), a member of the Otakar dynasty, was Margrave of Styria from 1164 and Duke from 1180, when Styria, previously a margraviate subordinated to the stem duchy of Bavaria, was raised to the status of an independent duchy.

== Biography ==
He was the only son of Margrave Ottokar III of Styria (1124–1164) and his wife Kunigunde (d. 1184), a daughter of the Bavarian margrave Diepold III of Vohburg and sister-in-law of Emperor Frederick Barbarossa. His father bequested him extended estates stretching from the Danube down the Mur river to the March of Carniola. By the mid 12th century, the Otakars moved their residence from Steyr to the Castle Hill (Schlossberg) in Graz.

A minor upon his father's death on a crusade in 1164, Ottokar IV was raised under the tutelage of his mother Kunigunde and Styrian ministeriales. The young margrave entered into several conflicts with the neighbouring Babenberg dukes of Austria and also with the Spanheim duke Herman of Carinthia. Backed by his maternal uncle Emperor Frederick Barbarossa, he made great efforts to secure the Imperial border against the Kingdom of Hungary in the east; he had his Graz residence rebuilt and the fortress of Fürstenfeld erected about 1170. When at the 1180 Imperial Diet of Gelnhausen the emperor declared the rebellious Bavarian duke Henry the Lion deposed, he detached the Styrian march from his duchy and elevated Ottokar to a duke in his own right.

Childless and deathly ill, Ottokar IV, who had contracted leprosy while on crusade, was the first but also the last duke of the Otakars. With the consent of the emperor, he entered into the Georgenberg Pact with Duke Leopold V of Austria in 1186: both dukes met in Enns and agreed that Ottokar was to give his duchy to Leopold and to his son Frederick, under the stipulation that Austria and Styria would henceforth remain undivided. The inheritance contract brought Styria under joint rule with the Duchy of Austria after Ottokar's death in 1192.

He was buried in his father's foundation of Žiče Charterhouse; in 1827 his remains were transferred to Rein Abbey. His gravestone from before/around 1200 with the full-length depiction of him was moved to the church of St. Heinrich am Bachern (now the Church of Sveta Areha in Frajhajm, Slovenia).

Ottokar IV of Styria Otakars Born: 19 August 1163 Died: 8 May 1192
Preceded by Ottokar III	Margrave of Styria from 1180: Duke of Styria; 1164–1192	Succeeded by Leopold V of Austria
