= Pellegrino II of Aquileia =

Patriarch of Aquileia

Pellegrino II
- Patriarch of Aquileia
- Installed: 1195
- Term ended: 1204
- Predecessor: Godfrey
- Successor: Wolfger von Erla

Personal details
- Died: 1204

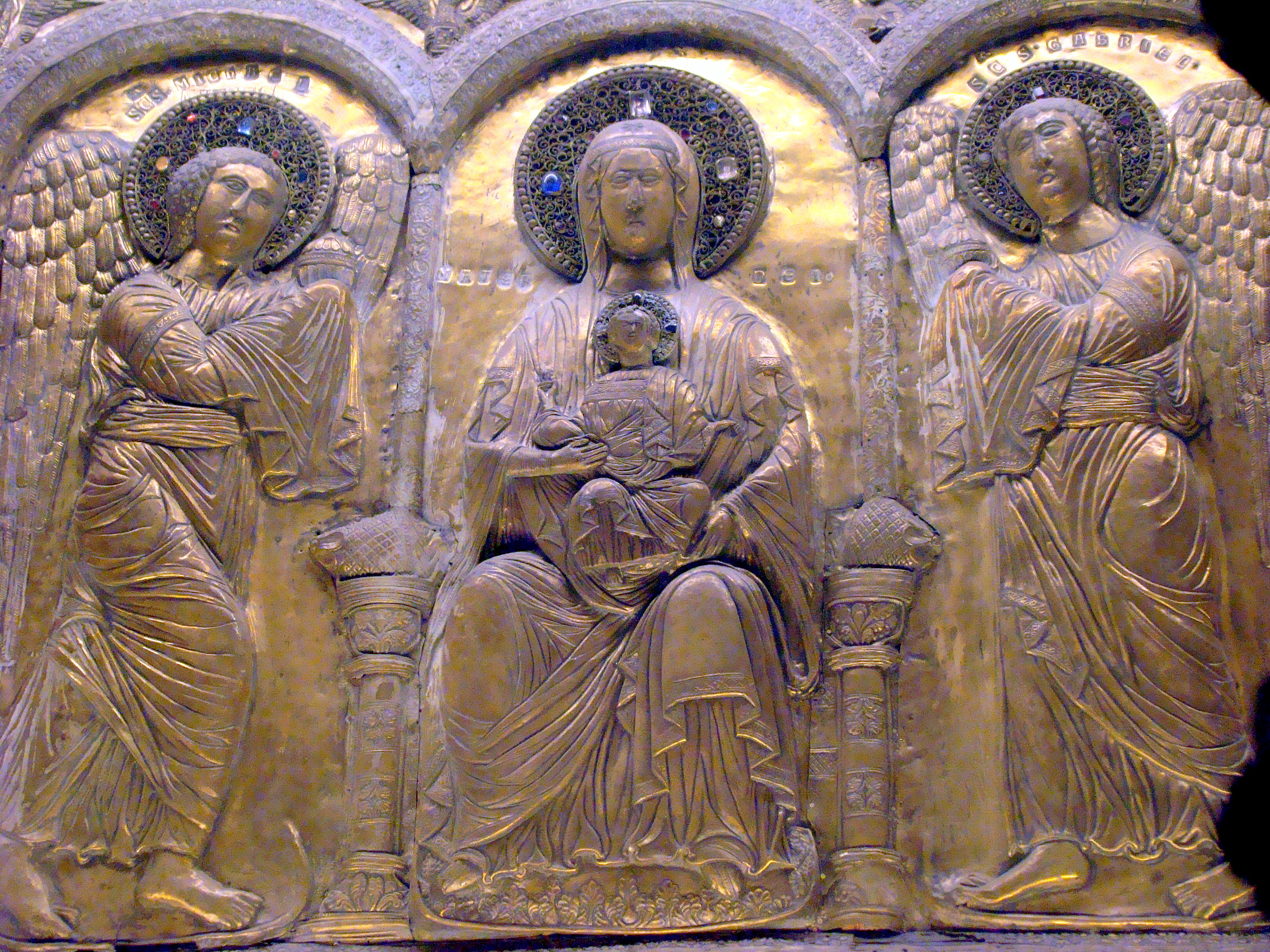
Altarpiece of Pellegrino II in the Cathedral of Cividale del Friuli

Pellegrino II (Latin: Peregrinus, German: Pilgrim; died 1204) was Patriarch of Aquileia in northern Italy from 1195 to 1204.

== Origins ==
Pellegrino was born in Cividale del Friuli to the Ortenburg-Sponheim family, son of Margrave Engelbert III of Istria (1124-1173). His nephew was Duke Ulrich II of Carinthia (1181-1202). He became prior of Cividale, then archdeacon of Aquileia. Pellegrino succeeded Godfrey as Patriarch of Aquileia in 1195.

== Patriarch ==
During Pellegrino's patriarchy there were constant wars against Gorizia, Treviso and Ezzelino II da Romano. Pellegrino remained neutral when war broke out in 1198 between two contenders for the German throne, the Ghibelline Philip of Swabia and the Guelph Otto of Brunswick. He continued his war against Treviso, laying siege to Pordenone, but was defeated in 1201 by the League at Tagliamento. Pellegrino was forced to seek an alliance with Venice. As part of the price, at a conference in San Quirino at Cormons in 1202 the counts of Gorizia were given full independence of Aquileia.

Towards the end of his reign Pellegrino dedicated a silver relief Altarpiece of Pellegrino II that today adorns the main altar of the church of Santa Maria Assunta in Cividale. It is unusual in showing an early example of typography, where letters were punched into the metal.

Pellegrino was succeeded by Wolfger von Erla in 1204.

Catholic Church titles
Preceded by Godfrey	Patriarch of Aquileia; 1195-1204	Succeeded by Wolfger von Erla
