= Agnes of Austria (1150s–1182) =

Austrian royal (died 1182)

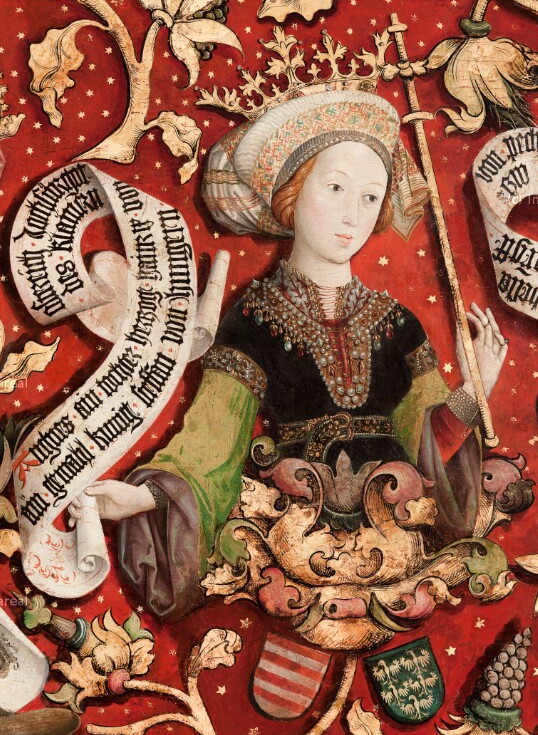

Queen consort of Hungary
- Tenure: 1168 – 4 March 1172

Duchess consort of Carinthia
- Tenure: 1173 – 4 October 1181
- Born: c. 1154; Austria
- Died: 13 January 1182; Austria
- Burial: Schottenstift, Vienna
- Spouse: Stephen III of Hungary; Herman, Duke of Carinthia
- Issue: Ulrich II, Duke of Carinthia; Bernhard von Spanheim
- House: Babenberg
- Father: Henry II, Duke of Austria
- Mother: Theodora Komnene

Agnes of Austria (c. 1151/54 – 13 January 1182), a member of the House of Babenberg, was Queen of Hungary from 1168 until 1172 by her first marriage with King Stephen III of Hungary and Duchess of Carinthia by her second marriage with Duke Herman of Carinthia from 1173 until 1181.

== Life ==
Agnes was the eldest child of the Babenberg duke Henry II of Austria and his second wife, the Byzantine princess Theodora Komnene.

=== Queen ===
In 1166, Duke Henry II, who was mediating a peace between King Stephen III of Hungary and Emperor Manuel I Komnenos, proposed a marriage between his daughter, Agnes and the young king. However, the King decided to marry an unnamed daughter of Yaroslav Osmomysl (1167); nevertheless, his betrothal ended soon: the princess was repudiated and sent back to her father in 1168. The negotiations with Austria were renewed and Agnes was married to King Stephen III in the same year.

=== Later life ===
Just after her husband's funeral, the widowed Agnes left for the Duchy of Austria with her father. One year later (1173) she was married again, to the Sponheim duke Herman of Carinthia. They had two sons: Ulrich II (born in 1176) and Bernhard II (born in 1180) who were later Dukes of Carinthia.

Duke Herman died in 1181. Agnes survived him only one year. She was buried in the Crypt of the Schottenstift in Vienna, next to her parents.

== Sources ==
- Mielke, Christopher (2021). The Archaeology and Material Culture of Queenship in Medieval Hungary, 1000–1395. Palgrave Macmillan.

Agnes of Austria (1150s–1182) House of Babenberg Born: c. 1151/54 Died: 1182
Royal titles
Preceded by Euphrosyne of Kiev	Queen consort of Hungary; 1168–1172	Succeeded by Maria Komnene
Preceded by Maria of Bohemia	Duchess consort of Carinthia; 1173–1181	Succeeded by Judith of Bohemia
