= Herman III of Baden =

Margrave of Verona and Baden (c.1105–1160)

Hermann III of Baden

Margraviate of Baden
- Reign: 1130 – 1160
- Predecessor: Hermann II of Baden
- Successor: Hermann IV of Baden
- Born: 1105
- Died: 16 January 1160
- Noble family: House of Zähringen
- Spouses: Bertha von Lothringen; Maria of Bohemia
- Issue: Hermann IV; Gertrud
- Father: Hermann II of Baden
- Mother: Judith of Backnang-Sulichgau

Hermann III of Baden (c. 1105 – 16 January 1160), nicknamed the Great, was Margrave of Verona and Baden.

== Life ==
He was the son of Hermann II of Baden and his wife Judith of Backnang-Sulichgau. He was ruler of the margraviate of Baden from 1130 until 1160.

Faithfully devoted to the Staufens, Hermann III came in conflict with his relatives from Zähringen-Swabia. In 1140 he participated in the siege of Weibtreu castle, and received the bailiwick of Selz in Alsace.

In 1151 the margraviate of Verona was taken from Ottokar III of Styria and conferred on Hermann III. A deed of donation exists from 1153, that states Frederick I bought Castle Besigheim from Hermann III.

Hermann III fought in the first Italian campaign of Emperor Frederick I, and he gained the title Margrave of Verona. He also took part in the Second Crusade. Hermann III was buried at Backnang Abbey, an Augustinian monastery in Backnang.

== Marriage and children ==
He was married in 1134 to Bertha von Lothringen (d. after 1162), who was the daughter of Simon I, Duke of Lorraine, and his wife Adelaide of Leuven. They had the following children:

- Hermann IV
- Gertrud

Secondly, he married Maria of Bohemia after 1141. She was the daughter of Duke Sobeslav I of Bohemia.

== Sources ==
- Arnold, Benjamin (1991). Princes and Territories in Medieval Germany. Cambridge University Press.
- Berry, Virginia G. (1969). "The Second Crusade". In Baldwin, Marshall W. (ed.). A History of the Crusade. The University of Wisconsin Press.
- Freed, John B. (2016). Frederick Barbarossa: The Prince and the Myth. Yale University Press. ISBN 978-0-300-12276-3.
- Loud, Graham A.; Schenk, Jochen, eds. (2017). The Origins of the German Principalities, 1100-1350: Essays by German Historians. Routledge.

Preceded by Hermann II of Baden	Margrave of Baden; 1130–1160	Succeeded by Hermann IV of Baden
