= Ulrich I of Carinthia =

Ulrich I (died 7 April 1144), of the House of Sponheim, was the Duke of Carinthia and Margrave of Verona from 1135 until his death. He was the eldest son of Duke Engelbert and Uta, daughter of Burggrave Ulrich of Passau, his namesake. His father abdicated in 1135 and Ulrich was appointed his successor by the Emperor Lothair II at an imperial diet being held in Bamberg.

In 1136–37 Ulrich took part in the emperor's expedition into Italy. From 1138 on Ulrich was involved in disputes with the Carinthian nobility and with the archbishopric of Salzburg and the bishopric of Bamberg, both large landowners in Carinthia. He died in 1144 and was buried in the monastery of Rosazzo.

Ulrich married Judith of Baden, daughter of Margrave Hermann II of Baden.

- Henry V, Duke of Carinthia, succeeded his father while still a youth, died childless in 1161
- Herman, Duke of Carinthia, succeeded his brother Henry
- Ulrich, Count of Laibach (Ljubljana), but predeceased his eldest brother.
- Godfrey (Gottfried) became a monk, but predeceased his father.
- Pilgrim became the Patriarch of Aquileia.

== Sources ==
- Hausmann, Friedrich. "Die Grafen zu Ortenburg und ihre Vorfahren im Mannesstamm, die Spanheimer in Kärnten, Sachsen und Bayern, sowie deren Nebenlinien". Ostbairische Grenzmarken – Passauer Jahrbuch für Geschichte Kunst und Volkskunde 36 (1994): 9–62.
- Ortenburg-Tambach, Eberhard Graf zu. Geschichte des reichsständischen, herzoglichen und gräflichen Gesamthauses Ortenburg, vol. 1: Das herzogliche Haus in Kärnten. Vilshofen, 1931.
