= August Prinzhofer =

Austrian artist (1816–1885)

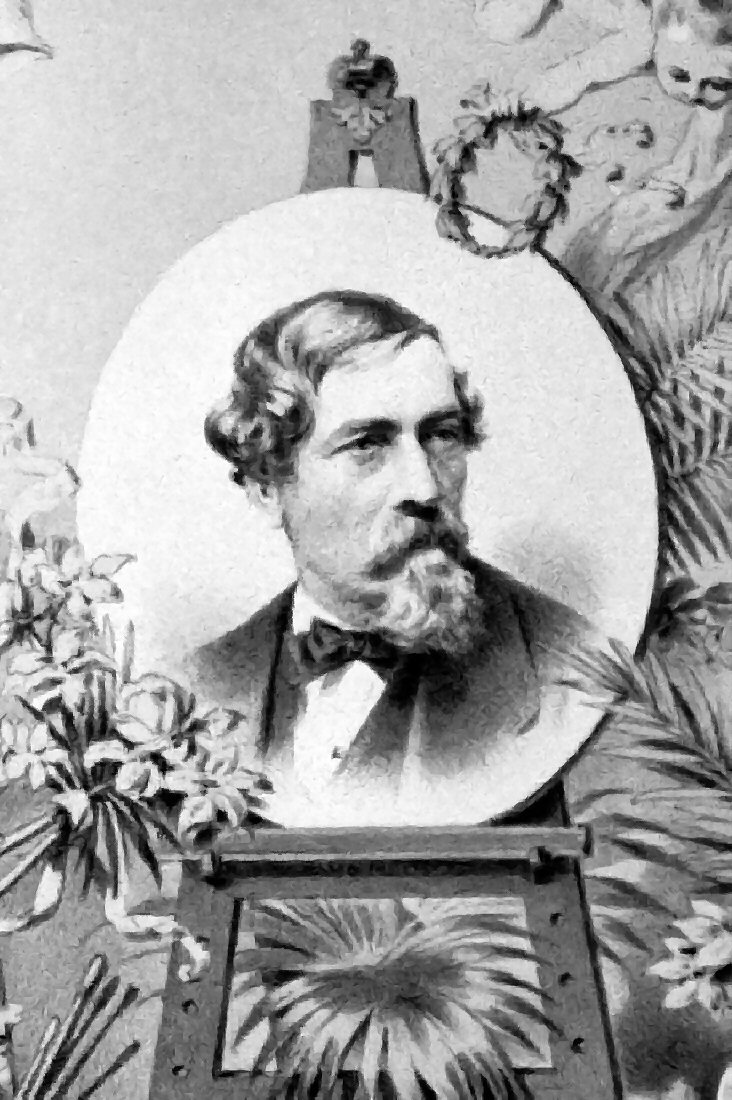
- Born: 12 September 1816; St. Veit an der Glan, Austrian Empire
- Died: 4 August 1885 (aged 68); Bad Steinerhof bei Kapfenberg, Austria-Hungary
- Occupations: Painter; lithographer

August Prinzhofer (12 September 1816 – 4 August 1885) was an Austrian painter and lithographer.

== Life ==
Born on 12 September 1816, in St. Veit an der Glan, Prinzhofer came from a long-established Carinthian family. He studied law in Vienna and Padua. He worked in a civil court in Vienna from 1844 onwards as well as a simultaneous and successful career as a portraitist, until in 1854 he gave up the law to devote himself entirely to portraiture.

Prinzhofer was one of the artists who led to the flowering of photolithography in Vienna from 1830 to 1860. Others included Joseph Kriehuber, Franz Eybl and Eduard Kaiser. His lithographs included more than 500 portraits (of subjects including Hector Berlioz, Ludwig von Benedek, Ignaz Franz Castelli, Archduke John of Austria, Lajos Kossuth, Albert Lortzing, Alois Negrelli, pope Pius IX, Johann Ladislaus Pyrker and Johann Nestroy). In 1861, Prinzhofer moved to Graz and dedicated himself solely to oil-on-canvas portraits and watercolour miniatures.

== Bibliography ==
- (in German) G. Gsodam: Prinzhofer August. In: Österreichisches Biographisches Lexikon 1815–1950 (ÖBL). Volume 8, Verlag der Österreichischen Akademie der Wissenschaften, Wien 1983, ISBN 3-7001-0187-2, S. 284.
- (in German) Gottfried Rittershausen, August Prinzhofer, Walter Krieg Verlag, 1962
- (in German) August Prinzhofer. In: Ulrich Thieme, Felix Becker etc. : Allgemeines Lexikon der Bildenden Künstler von der Antike bis zur Gegenwart. Volume 27, E. A. Seemann, Leipzig 1933, S. 406f
- (in German) Prinzhofer August In Constantin von Wurzbach: Biographisches Lexikon des Kaisertums Österreich, 23. Volume, S. 311, Wien 1872
