= Herman II of Baden =

First Margrave of Baden

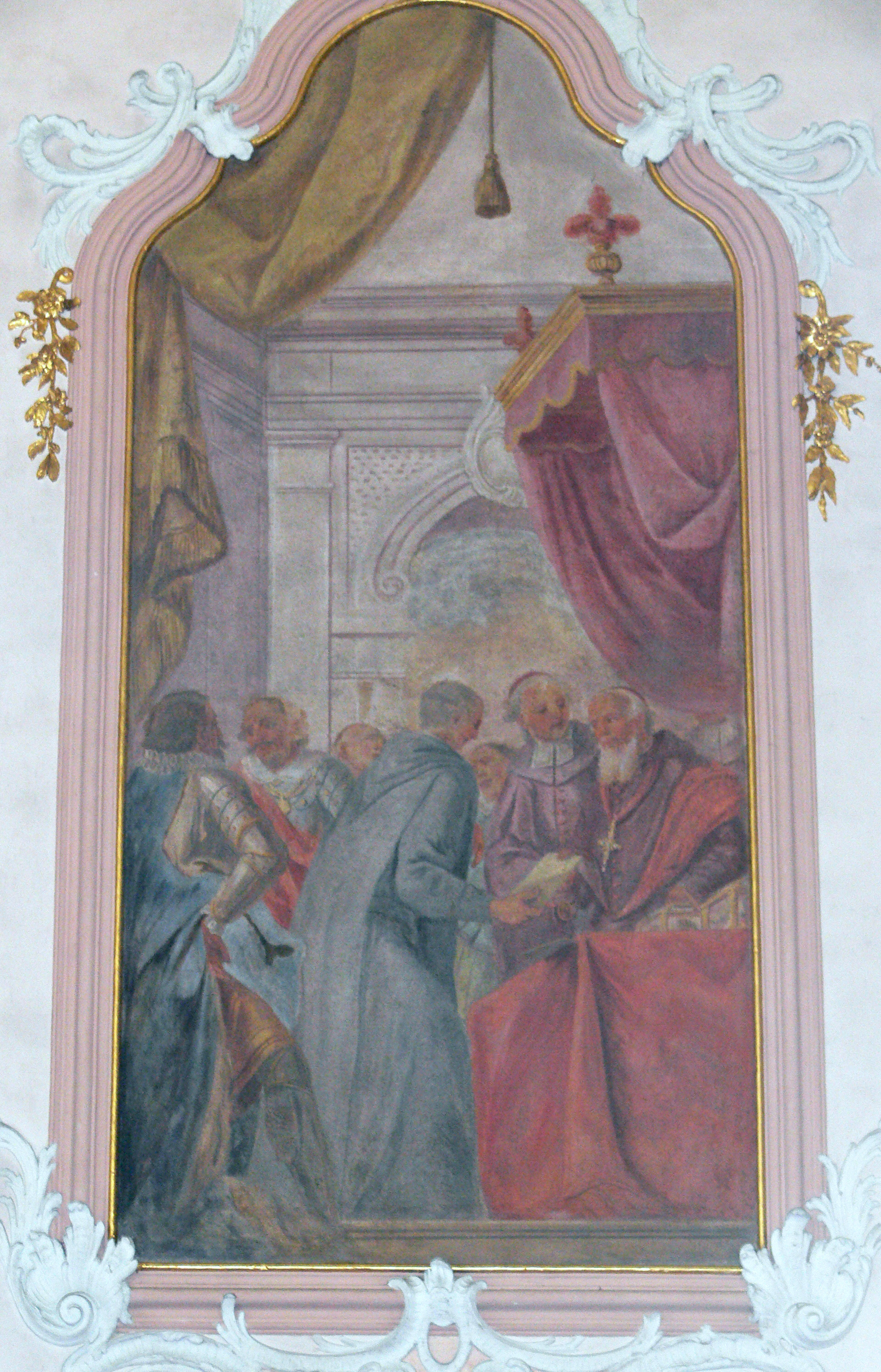
Saint Ulrich von Zell receives from the bishop of Basel the letter offering the lands Ambringen and Biengen, before the witnesses Berthold II and his nephew Herman II, by Franz Ludwig Hermann.

Hermann II of Baden (c. 1060 – 7 October 1130) was the first to use the title Margrave of Baden, after the family seat at Hohenbaden Castle. This castle is in the present-day town of Baden-Baden.

== Life ==
He was the son of Hermann I of Baden and his wife, Judith. He was the ruler of the March of Verona from 1074 until 1130.

He styled himself as Dominus in Baden, comes Brisgaviae, marchio Verona (in Latin). In English, his titles were: Lord in Baden, Count of Brisgau, Margrave of Verona. Around 1070, Hermann began to build Hohenbaden Castle on top of the remains of an old Celtic structure. After the castle was completed in 1112, he gave himself the title Margrave of Baden.

Hermann established Backnang Abbey, an Augustinian monastery in Backnang. After he died, he was laid to rest in the monastery with the inscription:

"In this tomb lies the Margrave Hermann of Baden, who was the founder of this monastery and temple. He died in the year thousand increased by hundred and three times ten from the time when the pious virgin bore. When he was transferred here along with his descendancy, fifteen hundred years had passed, thereto ten onandall three."

== Marriage and children ==
Hermann married Judith of Backnang-Sulichgau, and they had the following children:

1. Hermann III
2. Judith

== Sources ==
- Fester, Richard (1892). Regesten der Markgrafen von Baden und Hachberg, 1050-1515. Hrsg. von der Badischen historischen Commission. Innsbruck Wagner.
- Florian Lamke: Die frühen Markgrafen von Baden, die Hessonen und die Zähringer. In: Zeitschrift für die Geschichte des Oberrheins. 154 (2006) (ISSN 0044-2607) S. 21–42.
- Sachs, Johann Christian (1754). Einleitung in die Geschichte der Marggravschaft und des marggrävlichen altfürstlichen Hauses Baden (in German). Metzler.

Preceded by Title created	Margrave of Baden; 1112–1130	Succeeded by Hermann III of Baden
