= Bernard of Carinthia =

Duke of Carinthia

Bernhard of Spanheim
- Duke of Carinthia
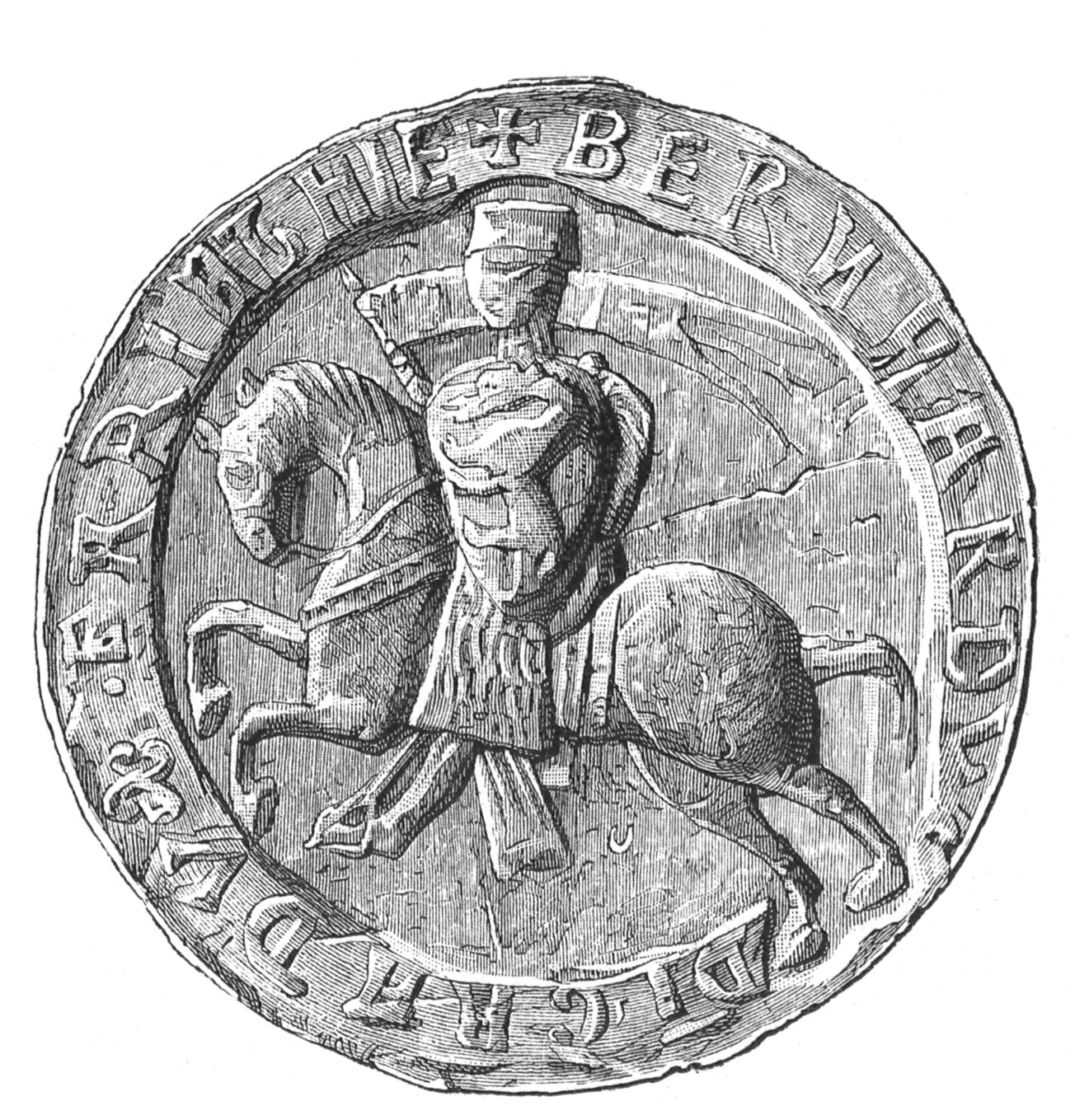
- Seal of Bernhard, Duke of Carinthia
- Reign: 1202–1256
- Predecessor: Ulrich II, Duke of Carinthia
- Successor: Ulrich III, Duke of Carinthia
- Born: c. 1176/81
- Died: 4 January 1256 (Aged 74-80); Völkermarkt
- Buried: St. Paul's Abbey
- Noble family: House of Sponheim
- Spouse: Judith of Bohemia
- Father: Herman of Carinthia
- Mother: Agnes of Babenberg

Bernhard von Spanheim (or Sponheim; 1176 or 1181 – 4 January 1256), a member of the noble House of Sponheim, was Duke of Carinthia for 54 years from 1202 until his death. A patron of chivalry and minnesang, Bernhard's reign marked the emergence of the Carinthian duchy as an effective territorial principality.

== Family ==
In 1122 Bernhard's ancestor Count Henry of Sponheim, descending from Rhenish Franconia, had inherited the Imperial estate of Carinthia. Upon his death in the following year, he was succeeded by his younger brother Engelbert, Bernhard's great-grandfather.

His father was Duke Herman of Carinthia, who had reigned from 1161 until 1181. He was at first succeeded by Bernhard's elder brother Duke Ulrich II, who reigned for two decades but died childless on 10 August 1202, whereafter Bernhard succeeded him. His mother was Agnes of Austria (c. 1151/54 – 13 January 1182), a member of the House of Babenberg.

== Reign ==
Bernhard had actually been regent over the Carinthian duchy since his elder brother Duke Ulrich II had fallen seriously ill, possibly with leprosy, after he had joined the Crusade of 1197. In the conflict between the rivaling House of Hohenstaufen and the Welfs around the German throne upon the death of Emperor Henry VI, he originally continued his brother's support for their Hohenstaufen relative Philip of Swabia but turned to the Welf Otto IV after Philipp's assassination in 1208 and attended his coronation in Rome. Bernhard again switched sides to Philip's nephew Frederick II, who had been elected King of the Romans in 1212 and finally prevailed.

Bernhard remained a loyal supporter of the Hohenstaufen dynasty. He backed the efforts by Grand Master Hermann von Salza to reach a reconciliation between Emperor Frederick II and Pope Gregory IX and sealed a 1230 peace agreement in the church of San Germano. He later also intermediated in the conflict between the emperor and his rebellious son King Henry VII; in 1237, he supported the election of Henry's younger brother King Conrad IV. However, in his later years, having established marital relationships with the Bohemian Přemyslid dynasty and the Counts of Andechs, he turned away from straitened Frederick II towards the ultramontane party. In 1247 he achieved the election of his younger son Philip as Archbishop of Salzburg.

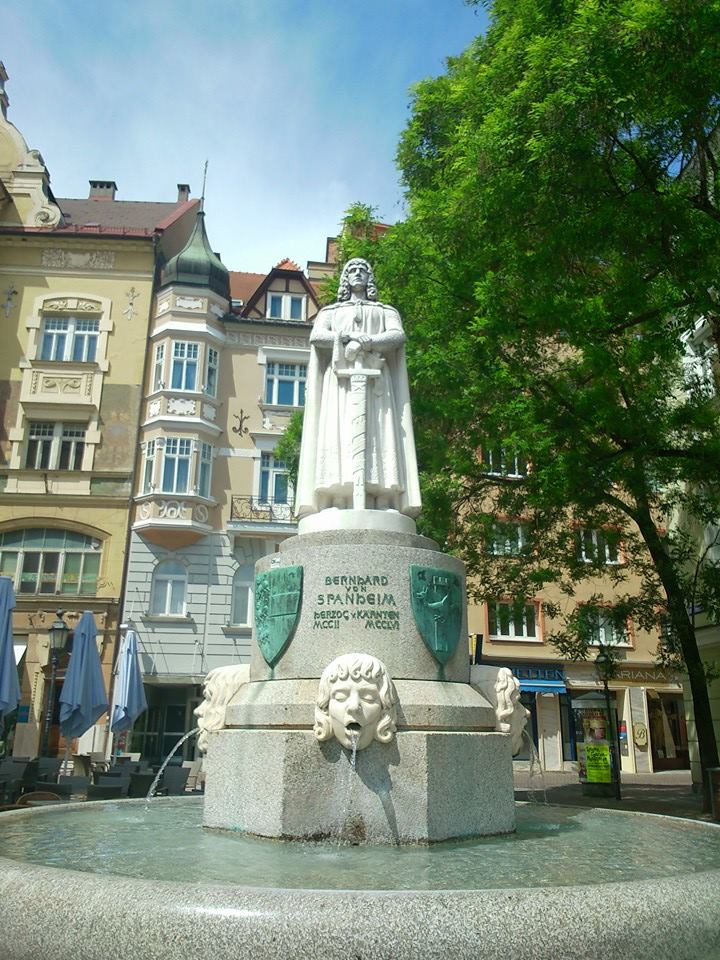
Bernhard von Spanheim fountain, Klagenfurt

A territorial prince (princeps terre) at his own judgement, Bernhard concentrated on regional politics and aimed at extending his estates against rivalling territorial princes like Patriarch Berthold of Aquileia or the Bishops of Bamberg controlling the city of Villach and important trade routes to Italy, albeit without much success. Moreover, the Salzburg archbishops were able to strengthen their position by establishing the suffragan dioceses of Seckau and Lavant in 1218 and 1225 respectively, while the duke picked a long-time quarrel with Count Meinhard III of Gorizia around the small Greifenburg estates.

In turn, Bernhard entrenched a ducal centre of force comprising the city triangle of Sankt Veit, where he established a mint in 1205, Völkermarkt, and Klagenfurt, the later Carinthian capital that he had transferred to its present location in 1246. Bernhard's court in Sankt Veit was the site of festive chivalrous tournaments and a venue of minnesingers like Walther von der Vogelweide. In his Frauendienst poem, Ulrich von Liechtenstein renders his arrival in Carinthia in the guise of a Venus in 1227, when Duke Bernhard received him with the Slovene salutation Buge waz primi, gralva Venus ("God be with you, royal Venus").

Bernhard's hopes to extend his influence after the extinction of the Austrian Babenberg dynasty in 1246 were disappointed. Nevertheless, he gained control over the strategically important Loibl Pass and Seeberg Saddle, leading through the Karawanks mountain range to the adjacent March of Carniola in the south, where his son Ulrich III in 1248 became landgrave (dominus Carniolae) upon his marriage with Agnes of Andechs, daughter of Duke Otto I of Merania. He is also credited as founding the Kostanjevica (Landstraß) Cistercian Abbey in Lower Carniola about 1234. Bernhard is buried at St. Paul's Abbey in the Lavanttal.

== Marriage and children ==
Carinthian ducal coat of arms until 1246

Carinthian coat of arms from 1246

Duke Bernhard's exalted rank corresponds to his wedding with Judith, daughter of the Přemyslid King Ottokar I of Bohemia and the Árpád princess Constance of Hungary, in 1213. Four known children result from the marriage:

- Ulrich III (c. 1220–1269), Duke of Carinthia 1256–1269, Margrave of Carniola since 1248
- Bernhard of Carinthia (d. before 1249)
- Margaret of Carinthia (d. before 1249)
- Philip of Spanheim (d. 21/22 July 1279), Archbishop of Salzburg from 1247 to 1256 and Patriarch of Aquileia from 1269 to 1273.

The relationship with the Přemyslid dynasty became crucial, when Bernhard's son Duke Ulrich III died without heirs in 1269. His younger brother Philip was claimant to the estates of Carinthia and Carniola, he nevertheless could not prevail against his first cousin King Ottokar II of Bohemia, who in 1268 had signed an inheritance treaty with late Duke Ulrich. Though Philip even reached his enfeoffment by the Habsburg king Rudolf I of Germany in 1275, he could not assume the rule after King Ottokar II was killed at the 1278 Battle on the Marchfeld.

Bernard of Carinthia House of Sponheim Born: c. 1176/81 Died: 4 January 1256
Preceded by Ulrich II	Duke of Carinthia; 1202-1256	Succeeded by Ulrich III

== Sources ==
- Loud, Graham A.; Schenk, Jochen, eds. (2017). The Origins of the German Principalities, 1100-1350: Essays by German Historians. Taylor & Francis.
