= Thomasin von Zirclaere =

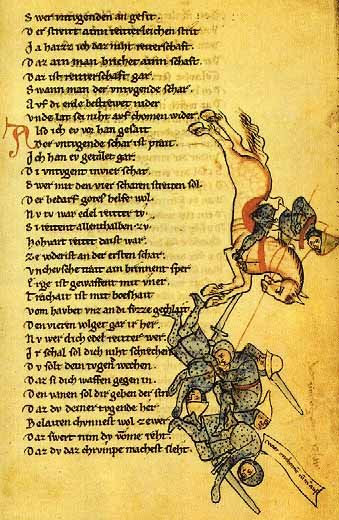
Page from Der wälsche Gast, Heidelberg manuscript, mid 13th century

Thomasin von Zirclaere, also called Thomasîn von Zerclaere or Tommasino Di Cerclaria (c. 1186 – c. 1235) was an Italian Middle High German lyric poet. The epic poem Der Wälsche Gast (original: Der welhische gast, "The Romance stranger") is the only preserved work by him.

== Life ==
Thomasin's ancestry remains obscure. The noble Cerclaria dynasty from Cividale was among the ministeriales in the Patria del Friuli (Patriarchate of Aquileia), an ecclesiastical Imperial State in Italy. From about 1206 he was a canon of the cathedral chapter under Patriarch Wolfger von Erla, the former Bishop of Passau, who had already been a patron of Walther von der Vogelweide and Albrecht von Johansdorf.

The title wälsch/welsch (walhaz) refers to himself, as his mother tongue was Italian (or Friulian) and he apologizes in advance for any linguistic inadequacies. The poem has about 14,750 lines and is written in the Middle High German language with distinct Bavarian elements. According to Thomasin's own accounts he put it down within ten months in 1215/16. The poem became exceptionally popular and is rendered by 24 preserved medieval illuminated manuscripts. It seems that the miniature illustrations were also conceived by Thomasin himself.

The text is aimed at young nobles lecturing on courtesy, courtly love (minne), and chivalry, based on contemporary scholastic works on ethics, philosophy, and the liberal arts. The adoption of (Bavarian) Middle High German by a non-native speaker is a valuable contemporary source for linguistic researchers.
