= Godfrey (patriarch of Aquileia) =

- Patriarch of Aquileia
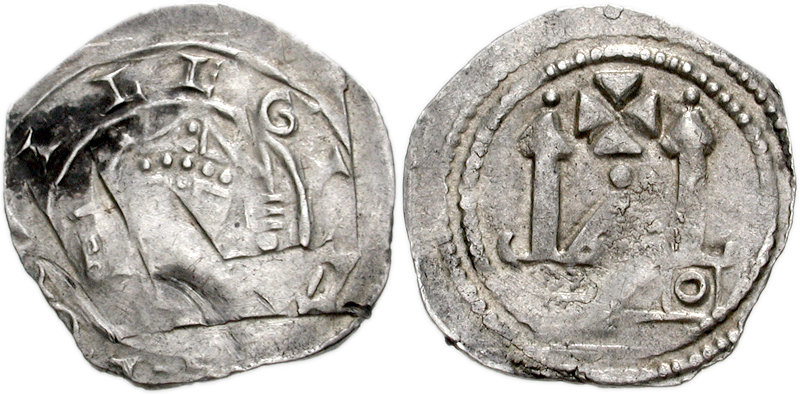
- denaro with Godfrey standing facing, holding staff and book of Gospels with lettering
- Installed: 1182
- Term ended: 9 October 1194
- Predecessor: Ulrico di Treven
- Successor: Pellegrino II

Personal details
- Died: 9 October 1194 Udine

Godfrey, known in Italian as Goffredo, Gotofredo or Gotifredo (died 9 October 1194), was Patriarch of Aquileia in northern Italy from 1182 to 1194. He was a supporter of the Imperial party in its disputes with the Pope. He was involved in a war with the neighboring commune of Treviso, which was unresolved at his death.

== Early years ==
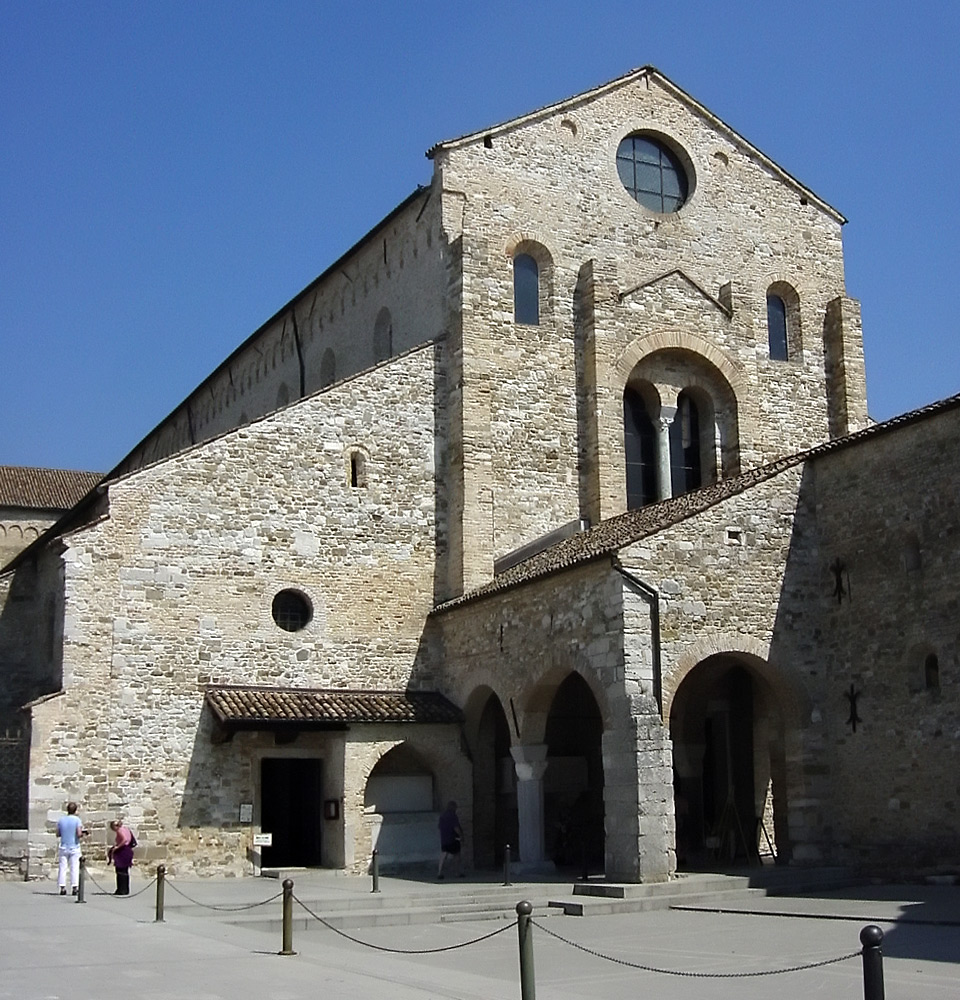
Basilica of Aquileia

Godfrey was of German origin, a Ghibelline from the house of Hohenstaufen. The first record of him is from 1176, when he was abbot of Sesto. This Benedictine abbey was within the jurisdiction of Aquileia. The influence of painters from Aquileia is still visible in the head and wings of an archangel that has survived in the chapel of the archangel Michael in the abbey. In 1177 he was a participant in the Treaty of Venice between the Emperor Frederick Barbarossa (r. 1155–1190) and Pope Alexander III (r. 1159–1181), which indicates he was already occupying an important position in church affairs.

== Patriarch ==
=== Imperial affairs ===
Godfrey succeeded Ulrico di Treven as Patriarch of Aquileia in 1182. In this role, he was legally a German prince, since Aquileia was within German territory. Godfrey was a supporter of the emperor Frederick Barbarossa. In 1183 he contracted a loan for the emperor with the Pavian family of Isembardi. This was just before the Peace of Constance, signed on 23 June 1183 between the emperor and the Italian communes, and may have been used by Frederick's envoys to sweeten the negotiations.

On 27 January 1186 Godfrey crowned the emperor's son, Henry of Swabia, as King of Italy in the Basilica of Sant'Ambrogio, Milan. Henry of Swabia was the future Emperor Henry VI. Godfrey's action drew the anger of the former Bishop of Milan, Pope Urban III, who felt that he should have been the one to perform the ceremony. The pope suspended Godfrey and all the ecclesiastics who attended the ceremony from divine office. This disagreement was short-lasting, and later that year when the diocese of Capodistria was established the pope stressed that it would be subordinate to Aquiliea. In 1190 the emperor Frederick Barbarossa named Godfrey the Imperial Vicar and left on the Third Crusade. Barbarossa died on 10 June 1190. Godfrey accompanied Henry VI to Rome where he was crowned emperor in April 1191.

=== Local disputes ===
Godfrey was temporal ruler of Friuli, Istria and Giapidia. He was the first patriarch to place his name on the coins of Aquileia, a practice that was continued by his successors. In 1183 he began a war with the neighboring commune of Treviso for control of the dioceses of Belluno, Ceneda and Feltre. In 1193 the municipality of Treviso plundered the lands of Feltre, Ceneda and Belluno. Godfrey responded by devastating seventy villages in Treviso.

Godfrey died on 9 October 1194 leaving his successor, Pellegrino II, huge debts and an ongoing war with Treviso.
