= Wolfger von Erla =

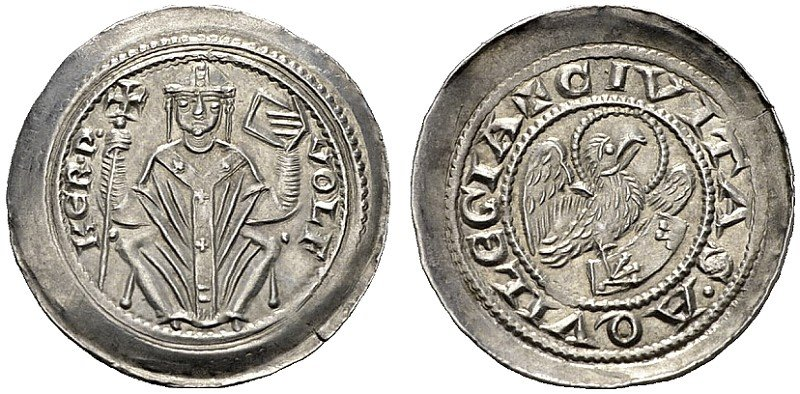
A denarius of Aquileia. The patriarch's effigy is on the obverse with the inscription VOLFKER P. The reverse shows an eagle, symbol of Aquileia, with the words CIVITAS AQVILEGIA.

Wolfger von Erla, (Note: Erroneously called Wolfger von Ellenbrechtskirchen or Wolfger von Leubrechtskirchen.) known in Italian as Volchero (c. 1140 – 23 January 1218), was the Bishop of Passau from 1191 until 1204 and Patriarch of Aquileia thereafter until his death.

He was renowned in his own time as a diplomat and peacemaker. He participated in the highest levels of the politics of the Holy Roman Empire, traveling frequently between Germany and Italy, where he served as imperial legate. He took part in the Crusade of 1197 and played a role in founding the Teutonic Knights.

Wolfger's courts at Passau and Aquileia attracted scholars and writers. His possible patronage of the Nibelungenlied has assured him a central place in the history of German literature.

== Early life ==
Wolfger was born to a noble family from Erla on the river Enns. Early documents show him as a married layman and with a least one son named Ottokar. He probably entered minor orders as a widower. In 1183, he became the provost of Pfaffmünster near Straubing and in 1184 of Zell am See. He became a canon of the cathedral of Passau, and was elected bishop on 11 March 1190. He was ordained to the priesthood only after his election, on the Saturday before Pentecost, 8 June, and consecrated bishop on Sunday 9 June, by Archbishop Adalbert of Salzburg. His son, who appears often in his episcopal expense account, regularly travelled with him while he was bishop.

== Bishop of Passau ==
As bishop, he expanded the holdings of his diocese and was a consistent ally of the Staufers and Babenbergs. In 1195, he was involved in negotiating the release of Richard the Lionheart, then imprisoned in Dürnstein under the care of Hadmar II of Kuenring. He attended the imperial diet held in Bari in April 1195. The Emperor Henry VI selected him to negotiate with Pope Celestine III over the succession to the Kingdom of Sicily.

At a diet in Worms in December 1195, Wolfger took the cross. He traveled with Duke Frederick I of Austria on the Crusade of 1197. He was part of the group of German princes who elevated the fraternity of the Hospital of Saint Mary of the Germans at Acre into an order of knighthood, the Teutonic Order. On his return, he successfully petitioned Pope Innocent III to grant the order a papal charter in 1199.

During the German throne dispute that followed Henry VI's death in 1197, Wolfger remained loyal to the Staufer candidate, Philip of Swabia. When the pope took the side of Otto of Brunswick, Wolfger was excommunicated.

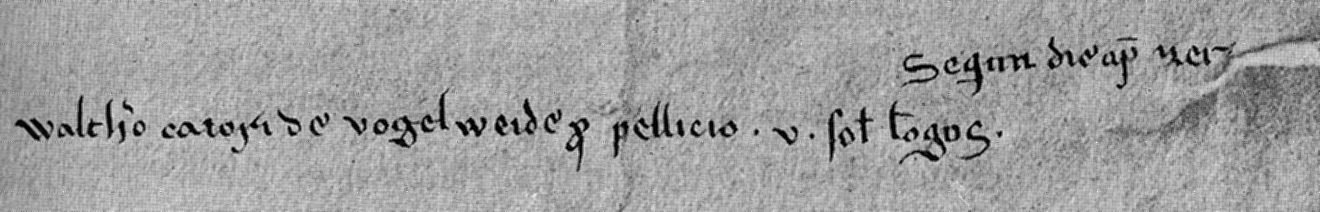
A line from the 12 November 1203 travel account of Wolfger at Zeiselmauer, recording the payment of "five shillings to Walter, the singer of Vogelweide, for a fur coat" (walthero cantori de vogelweide pro pellicio v solidos longos), a very large sum at the time.

Wolfger's episcopal travel accounts provide the only contemporary reference to the famous Minnesänger Walther von der Vogelweide outside of the Minnesang itself. He may also have been the patron of the author of the Middle High German Nibelungenlied, since a fictional bishop of Passau plays a prominent role in it. The poet Albrecht von Johansdorf was also associated with his court. The jurist Eilbert of Bremen dedicated his Ordo iudiciarius to Wolfger.

In 1204, Wolfger built the castle of Obernburg because of a feud with the Count of Ortenburg. He urged the creation of another diocese out of the territory of the diocese of Passau, but this never came to fruition before he began vigorously seeking election to the patriarchate of Aquileia.

== Patriarch of Aquileia ==
Innocent III did not prevent Wolfger's election as patriarch, even though the latter was excommunicated. In 1206, Innocent ordered him to go to Germany to negotiate with Philip. The result was a letter from Philip to the pope that opened negotiations to end the throne dispute. On 11 June 1206 in Nuremberg, Philip enfeoffed Wolfger with the Duchy of Friuli, the secular territory of the patriarchate. The patriarch was a driving force in bringing about the agreements between Philip, Otto and Innocent. Philip appointed him Reichslegaten (imperial legate) in the Kingdom of Italy and in return for his services granted him the imperial castle of Monselice. Having secured Innocent's recognition of Philip as imperial candidate, Wolfger was returning from Rome when Philip was assassinated (1208).

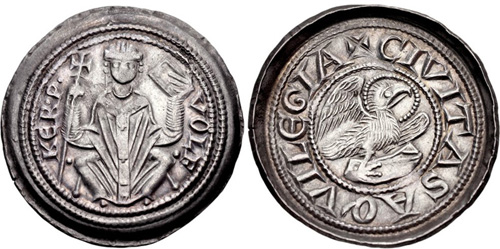
A denarius of Aquileia of Wolfger

Accused of involvement in the assassination of Philip, Margrave Henry II of Carniola and Istria was deprived of his fiefs by a diet at Frankfurt. Wolfger claimed the March of Carniola as an escheated fief of the patriarchate, but the March of Istria was considered escheated to the crown and the new undisputed king, Otto IV, granted it to Duke Louis of Bavaria. This was disputed by Wolfger, who cited the Emperor Henry IV's grant of 1077. In January 1209, Wolfger attended a diet in Augsburg held by Otto. The king confirmed his possession of the Duchy of Friuli and, on 8 May 1210, also enfeoffed him with Istria. From this point on, he used the title "margrave of Istria and Carniola" (Latin Istrie et Carniole marchio) in addition to his ecclesiastical titles. Although he governed Istria energetically, he does not seem to have exercised any actual power in Carniola, where Henry II remained in effective control.

Otto also confirmed Wolfger as Reichslegaten with responsibility for reasserting imperial rights and regaining imperial properties in Italy. He was so successful he even recouped lands Otto had secretly given over to the papacy. He was also tasked with preparing Italy for Otto's impending expedition to Rome for his imperial coronation. When, however, Otto laid claim to Sicily, which was Staufer by hereditary right, Wolfger left his service.

In 1211, Otto was excommunicated and the Staufer Frederick II elected to replace him. To prevent an outbreak of civil war, Wolfger advised Otto to marry Philip's daughter, the 13-year-old Beatrice, to whom he had been betrothed following Philip's death. Otto did so, but Beatrice died three weeks later (1212). In February 1214, Wolfger attended a diet of Frederick II in Augsburg to have the new king confirm Aquileia's privileges and fiefs and to have the castle of Monselice, which Otto had reclaimed, returned.

In 1215, Wolfger attended the Fourth Lateran Council and withdrew from imperial politics thereafter. His last act of diplomacy was to arranged peace treaties to end the War of the Castle of Love between Padua, Treviso and Venice in April 1216. At his death, he was revered as a man of moderation and patron of arts. His patronage had continued at Aquileia, where he hosted the poets Thomasin von Zirclaere and Boncompagno da Signa among others.

== Notes ==
Catholic Church titles
Preceded by Diepold of Berg	Bishop of Passau; 1191–1204	Succeeded by Poppo
Preceded by Pilgrim II	Patriarch of Aquileia; 1204–1218	Succeeded by Berthold von Meran
