= Judith of Baden =

German margravine

Judith of Baden (d.1162) was a German margravine, as the daughter of Herman II, Margrave of Baden by his wife Judith of Backnang.

Customary for the children of a ruling Margrave at the time, she was styled a "Margravine". She married Ulrich I, Duke of Carinthia with whom she had five children. She died in 1162 and was buried in a stone sarcophagus in the Augustine Chapel in the cloister of the Backnang Abbey. Her tomb was opened in 1513 by Christopher I of Baden, engraved, and then transferred to the choir of the church.
