= Leopold V, Duke of Austria =

Duke of Austria from 1177 to 1194

Leopold V the Virtuous
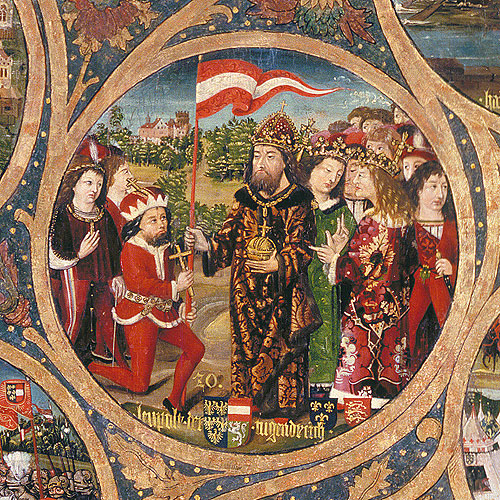
- Leopold receiving the banner from Emperor Henry VI, Babenberger Stammbaum, Klosterneuburg Monastery, 1489–1492

Duke of Austria
- Reign: 1177–1194
- Predecessor: Henry II
- Successor: Frederick I
- Born: 1157; Austria
- Died: 31 December 1194 (aged 37); Graz, Duchy of Styria
- Burial: Heiligenkreuz Abbey
- Spouse: Helena of Hungary
- Issue: Frederick I, Duke of Austria; Leopold VI, Duke of Austria
- House: House of Babenberg
- Father: Henry II
- Mother: Theodora Komnene

Leopold V (1157 – 31 December 1194), known as the Virtuous (German: der Tugendhafte) was a member of the House of Babenberg who reigned as Duke of Austria from 1177 and Duke of Styria within the Holy Roman Empire from 1192 until his death. The Georgenberg Pact resulted in Leopold being enfeoffed with Styria by Roman-German Emperor Frederick Barbarossa in 1193, which would lead to the eventual creation of modern Austria. Leopold was also known for his involvement in the Third Crusade where he fought in the Siege of Acre in 1191 and of his imprisonment of King Richard I in 1193 at Dürnstein Castle.

== Biography ==
Leopold was the son of the Austrian duke Henry II Jasomirgott from his second marriage with the Byzantine princess Theodora, a daughter of Andronikos Komnenos, the second eldest son of Emperor John II Komnenos. Just before his birth, his father had achieved the elevation of the Austrian margraviate to a duchy according to the 1156 Privilegium Minus, issued by Emperor Frederick Barbarossa. As the eldest son of Henry II, Leopold was already enfeoffed with the Austrian duchy by the emperor in the summer of 1174 at Regensburg.

He succeeded his father as Duke of Austria upon his death on 13 January 1177. Soon after, Leopold lent his support to Duke Frederick of Bohemia while the latter was stuck in a conflict with his Přemyslid cousin Soběslav II, who had campaigned in the Austrian duchy. In turn, Leopold reached a peace agreement with the neighbouring Duchy of Bohemia, determined by Emperor Frederick Barbarossa at Eger in 1179. Two years later, he attended an Imperial Diet in Erfurt, where his first-born son Frederick was enfeoffed with the Austrian estate. In 1182 Leopold went on a pilgrimage to the Holy Land and was received with honour at the courts of King Béla III of Hungary and of Emperor Alexios II Komnenos in Constantinople.

Back in Germany, he began negotiating on the Georgenberg Pact with the last Otakar duke of Styria, Ottokar IV, who had received the ducal title from Emperor Frederick in 1180. The agreement was concluded on 17 August 1186, whereafter Styria and the central part of Upper Austria with Wels and Steyr were amalgamated into the Duchy of Austria upon Ottokar's death in 1192. The next year, Leopold was enfeoffed with Styria by the emperor; this was the first step towards the creation of modern Austria.

Leopold is mainly remembered outside Austria for his participation in the Third Crusade. Border disputes with King Béla III of Hungary had initially impeded the duke from accompanying Emperor Frederick on his departure in May 1189. When he heard about the emperor's death in 1190, he went to Venice, where he embarked to the Holy Land. Autumn storms forced him to winter in Zadar on the Adriatic coast. He arrived in Palestine to take part in the final stage of the Siege of Acre in spring 1191. Leopold assumed command of the remnants of the Imperial forces after the death of the emperor's son, Duke Frederick of Swabia, in January. According to legend, his tunic was blood-soaked after the fights. When he doffed his belt, a white stripe appeared. The new emperor Henry VI granted him the privilege of adopting these colours as his new banner, that later would become the flag of Austria.

Acre surrendered on July 12, after the arrival of King Philip II of France and King Richard I of England. Duke Leopold, as commander of the German contingent, demanded rights equal to those of the two kings but was rejected. When the banners of the Kingdom of Jerusalem, England, France and Leopold's ducal flag were raised in the city by Leopold's cousin, Marquis Conrad of Montferrat, Richard removed Leopold's colours and the duke wrathfully left for his Austrian home, arriving by the end of 1191. In January 1192 he proceeded to the court of Emperor Henry VI and complained bitterly about Richard, who also was suspected of involvement in the murder of Conrad shortly after his election as King of Jerusalem in April the same year.

The emperor probably agreed with King Philip, already in conflict with the English king, on Richard's capture. When King Richard left the Holy Land in late October 1192, he found the French ports closed and sailed up the Adriatic Sea. He took the country road from Aquileia and then across to Austria to reach the Bavarian estates of his Welf brother-in-law Henry the Lion. Whilst travelling under disguise, he stopped at Vienna shortly before Christmas 1192, where he was recognized (supposedly because of his signet ring) and arrested in Erdberg (modern Landstraße district). Initially Duke Leopold had the king imprisoned in Dürnstein, and in March 1193 Richard was brought before Emperor Henry VI at Trifels Castle, accused of Conrad's murder. A ransom of 35,000 kilograms of silver was paid to release Richard. Leopold demanded that Richard's niece, Eleanor, marry his son Frederick. Leopold's share of the ransom became the foundation for the mint in Vienna, and was used to build new city walls for Vienna, as well as to found the towns of Wiener Neustadt and Friedberg in Styria. The duke was excommunicated by Pope Celestine III for having taken a fellow crusader prisoner.

To receive absolution, Leopold prepared for another crusade, but in 1194, his foot was crushed when his horse fell on him at a tournament in Graz. Though advised by his surgeons to have the foot amputated, no one admitted to being able to do it. He ordered his servants to chop his foot off with an axe, which they succeeded in doing after three swings. He succumbed to gangrene. As a result of deathbed promises to make restitution given to the hastily summoned Archbishop Adalbert of Salzburg, he was reconciled and received a Christian burial at Heiligenkreuz Abbey.

His son Frederick succeeded him as the new duke; due to his death, the marriage of Frederick and Eleanor never took place.

== Marriage and children ==
At Pentecost 1174, Leopold married Helena (1158–1199), a daughter of late King Géza II of Hungary. They had:

- Frederick I (c. 1175 – 1198), who succeeded his father as Duke of Austria
- Leopold VI (1176–1230), succeeded his father as Duke of Styria (inconsistent with the Georgenberg Pact) and became Duke of Austria upon his brother's death in 1198.
- Agnes

== Ancestry ==
Ancestors of Leopold V, Duke of Austria

8. Leopold II, Margrave of Austria
4. Leopold III, Margrave of Austria
9. Ida of Formbach-Ratelnberg
2. Henry II, Duke of Austria
10. Henry IV, Holy Roman Emperor
5. Agnes of Germany
11. Bertha of Savoy
1. Leopold V, Duke of Austria
12. John II Comnenus
6. Andronicus Comnenus
13. Piroska of Hungary
3. Theodora Komnene
7. Eirene (?Aineiadissa)

== See also ==
- List of rulers of Austria

Leopold V, Duke of Austria House of Babenberg Born: 1157 Died: 31 December 1194
Regnal titles
| Preceded by Henry II | Duke of Austria; 1177–1194 | Succeeded by Frederick I |
| Preceded by Ottokar IV | Duke of Styria; 1192–1194 | Succeeded by Leopold II |
