= Gertrude of Baden =

12th/13th-century German countess

- Born: Before 1160
- Died: Before 1225
- Noble family: House of Zähringen
- Spouse: Count Albert II of Dagsburg
- Issue: Henry; William; Gertrude
- Father: Hermann III, Margrave of Baden
- Mother: Bertha of Lorraine

Gertrude of Baden (before 1160 – before 1225) was a Margravine of Baden by birth and by marriage a Countess of Dagsburg. She was a daughter of Margrave Hermann III of Baden and his wife, Bertha of Lorraine.

== Marriages and issue ==
Gertrude married in 1180 to Albert II of Dagsburg (d. 1211). With him she had two sons, Henry and William, and a daughter, Gertrude (d. 1225). Both sons were killed in a tournament in Andain in 1202, so that the noble family of the Etichonids died out in the male line with Albert II in 1211. This left her daughter Gertrude as heiress of the county of Dagsburg.

Her daughter Gertrude married in 1206 in her first marriage to Duke Theobald I of Lorraine. In 1217, she married her second husband, Count Theobald IV of Champagne, who was also King of Navarre from 1234 as Theobald I. Theobald, however, repudiated her before 1223. In 1224, she married her third husband, Simon III of Saarbrücken and Leiningen (d. 1234 or 36), the son of Count Frederick II of Leiningen and Saarbrücken. When she died childless, her third husband Simon of Leiningen inherited the county of Dagsburg, thus creating the Leiningen-Dagsburg line.

== Sources ==
- Buchheit, Nicolas (2016). "A Geography of Power: The Hospitallers in the Territorial Policies of the Bishops of Strasbourg in Lower Alsace in the Thirteenth Century". In Edbury, Peter (ed.). The Military Orders: Politics and Power. Vol. V. Routledge.

Gertrude of Baden House of Zähringen Born: before 1160 Died: before 1225
Preceded by Albert II	Countess of Dagsburg; 1211–1215	Succeeded by Theobald I
