= Ulrich II of Aquileia =

Ulrich II (Latin: Voldoricus)
- Patriarch of Aquileia
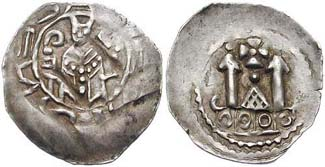
- Aquileian denaro with a bust of Ulrich standing facing holding Gospel and crosier
- Installed: 1161
- Term ended: 1181
- Predecessor: Pellegrino di Ortenbourg
- Successor: Godfrey

Personal details
- Died: 1182.04.01

Ulrich II von Treven was Patriarch of Aquileia in northern Italy from 1161 to 1181. He supported Frederick I, Holy Roman Emperor, (1122–1190) in his unsuccessful struggle for supremacy over the northern Italian states and the papacy. He was also involved in a dispute over jurisdiction with the Patriarch of Grado where he was ultimately successful.

== Early years ==
Ulrich was the son of Count Wolfrad I von Treffen, ruler of the town of Treffen in Austria. His mother Hemma was the daughter of Margrave Starchand. Ulrich became Patriarch of Aquileia in 1161, succeeding Pellegrino di Ortenbourg.

== Dispute with Grado ==
The metropolitan sees of Aquileia and Grado had long been rivals. Their dispute dated to the invasion of the Huns, when the Patriarch of Aquileia took refuge in Grado. He brought the relics of two saints that Saint Mark the Evangelist had baptized. Grado claimed this showed that ecclesiastical authority had been transferred to the "new Aquileia". In 1024 Poppo of Treffen, patriarch of Aquileia, used force to subjugate Grado at a time when the Patriarch Ursus of Grado and the doge Otto Orseolo of Venice were in exile. He reclaimed the relics of saints Hermagoras and Fortunatus. Three years later Pope John XIX declared that Grado was just a parish of Aquileia, which was metropolitan of all Venice. However, in 1044 Pope Benedict IX recognized the Patriarch Ursus of Grado as head of the New Aquileia, demoting the prelate of Aquileia to bishop of Friuli. In 1053 Pope Leo IX recognized Grado as metropolitan of all of Venetia and Istria.

In 1155 Pope Adrian IV granted the patriarch of Grado jurisdiction over parts of the coast of Dalmatia, causing renewed tension. Frederick Barbarossa, the Holy Roman Emperor, aimed to bring northern Italy into his domains. Barbarossa entered Italy with his armies in 1154, and in 1161 established control of the mainland around Venice. In 1162, while Venice was involved in a war with Padua and Ferrara, Patriarch Ulrich of Aquileia attacked Grado. Ulrich led forces from the region of Friuli into Grado, which he declared to be a precinct of Aquileia. Enrico Dandolo, the Patriarch of Grado, was forced to flee to Venice.

Ulrich's move was clearly part of a campaign to bring Venice under German subjugation. The doge, Vitale II Michiel, responded forcefully. He sent a powerful fleet to Grado, which he surrounded and captured. He took Ulrich prisoner and destroyed several of his castles in Friuli. He brought Ulrich and twelve of his canons back to Venice, with seven hundred captives. Eventually Pope Alexander III intervened to make a peace. The patriarch and the twelve canons were released in exchange for payment of an annual tribute of a bull, twelve pigs and 300 loaves of bread. The animals would be slaughtered in a public ceremony to commemorate the victory. This ceremony persisted as an element of the Venetian carnival for hundreds of years.

== Later years ==
Ulrich II continued to support the rival popes of the emperor until late in the 1160s, when he transferred his allegiance to Alexander III. On 29 May 1176 Frederick Barbarossa was defeated at the Battle of Legnano. On 24 July 1177 Sebastiano Ziani, the doge of Venice, and Ulrich II von Treven escorted the emperor from San Nicolò al Lido into Venice, where he met the pope and was reconciled in an emotional public scene in front of St Mark's Basilica. The Treaty of Venice, ratified on 1 August 1177, temporarily resolved the differences between the emperor, the papacy and the north Italian city-states of the Lombard League. The emperor formally acknowledged Pope Alexander III as pope.

Ulrich II, as a confidant of both the pope and the emperor, had been instrumental in reconciling the two and healing the division in the church. For this, Frederick confirmed and extended the secular jurisdiction of the patriarchate of Aquileia. In 1177 Alexander III confirmed that Aquileia had metropolitan authority with jurisdiction over sixteen bishoprics. On 24 July 1180 Patriarch Dandolo of Grado agreed to a final and formal resolution of the ancient disputes with the patriarchate of Aquileia.

The patriarchate of Grado arose in the VI century from the patriarchate of Aquileia, and separated from it due to a theological conflict. Since 1105 it was actually based in Venice and the see was under Venetian control (in 1451 it became the "Patriarchate of Venice"). In 1420 Venice defeated militarily and occupied the core lands of the Patriarchate of Aquileia, and from then on the Patriarchate was under their control, both for secular and ecclesiastical matters. The Patriarchate of Aquileia ended formally in 1751 with the 6 July bull Injunctio Nobis by pope Benedict XIV.

In the presence of Alexander III and Ulrich II of Aquileia, Dandolo renounced his claims to the disputed dioceses in Istria and to the relics and treasures that Poppo of Aquileia had taken from Grado at the start of the 11th century. Ulrich died in 1181. He was succeeded by the Patriarch Goffredo di Hohenstaufen.
