= Georgenberg Pact =

1186 treaty unifying the duchies of Austria and Styria

Austrian lands about 1250: Austria proper (in red) and Styria (hatched), later Habsburg acquisitions highlighted

The Georgenberg Pact (also called the Georgenberg Compact, German: Georgenberger Handfeste) was a treaty signed between Duke Leopold V of Austria and Duke Ottokar IV of Styria on 17 August 1186 at Enns Castle on the Georgenberg mountain.

The treaty consisted of two parts. The first part was an agreement under which the childless and deathly ill Ottokar IV, the first and last Styrian duke from the Otakar dynasty who had contracted leprosy while on the Third Crusade, was to pass his duchy to the Austrian duke Leopold V and to his son Frederick from the Franconian Babenberg dynasty, under the stipulation that Austria and Styria would henceforth remain united forever. The second part consists of a delineation of rights of the Styrian estates and citizens. It has been incorrectly called by English-speaking historians a "Styrian Magna Carta", for it sought to maintain the rights of the Styrian ministeriales in anticipation of the Babenberg acquisition.

The territory of Styria at the time went far beyond the modern Austrian state of Styria, and included lands not only in modern Slovenia (Lower Styria), but also in Upper Austria, more precisely the Traungau region around the cities of Wels and Steyr, as well as the present-day districts of Wiener Neustadt and Neunkirchen in Lower Austria.

The case of succession came to pass upon Ottokar's death in 1192, Styria has since then remained connected to Austria. The treaty was acknowledged by Emperor Frederick II in 1237. It was continued under the rule of the Habsburg dynasty after the line of Babenberg dukes became extinct in 1246; despite several interludes when the Styrian lands were ruled by Inner Austrian cadet branches. The Georgenberg Pact thus was the first step towards the creation of a complex of "hereditary lands" of the Habsburg monarchy.

The Pact formed an integral part of the Austrian constitution until the Revolutions of 1848. The original document is kept at the Styrian State Archive in Graz.
