= Backnang Abbey =

Former monastery in Backnang, Germany

Coordinates: 48°56′44″N 9°25′56″E

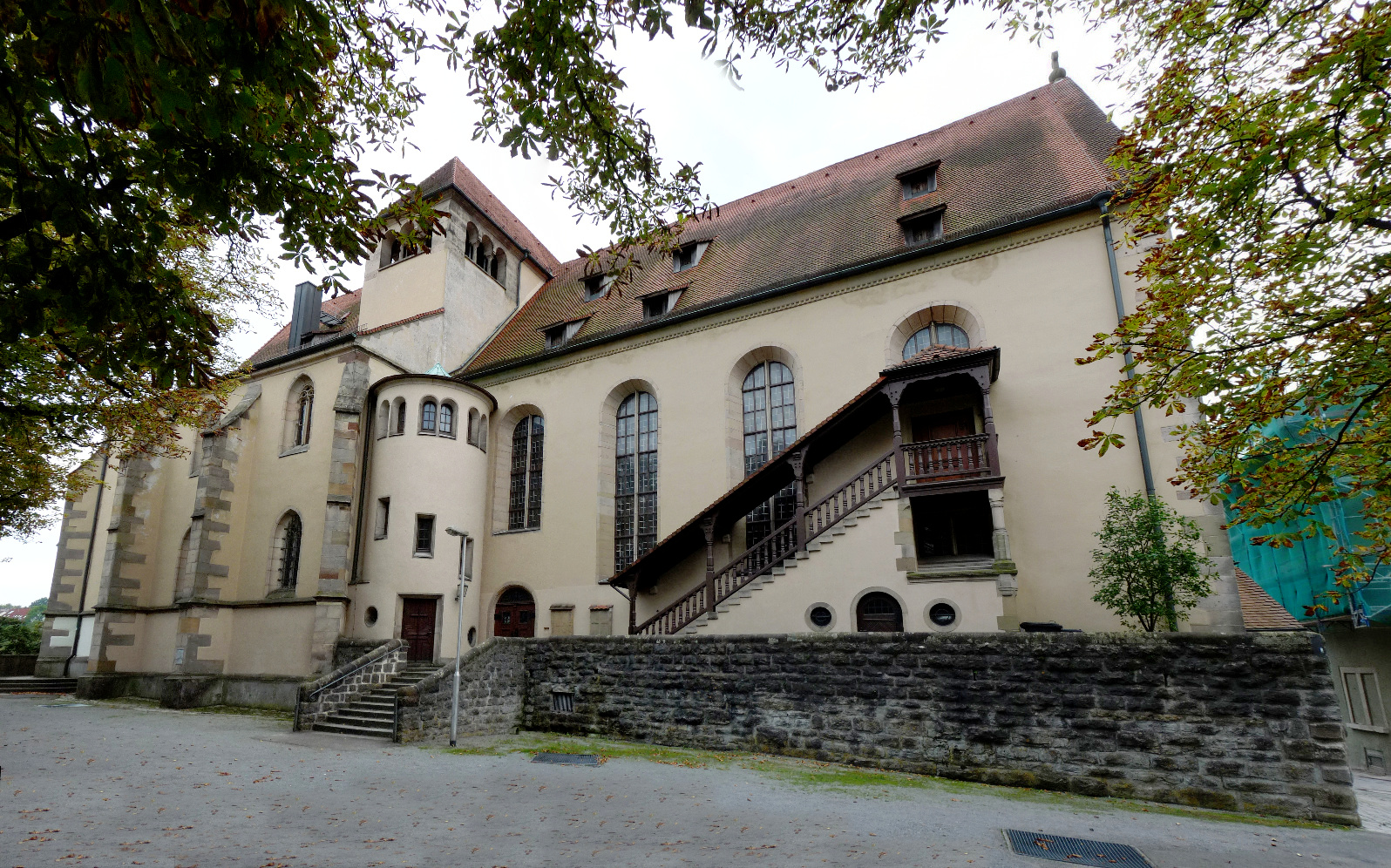
Back of the abbey church

The Abbey of Saint Pancras of Backnang, better known as Backnang Abbey (German: Stift Backnang), was a German monastery of canons regular that was located at Backnang in the Duchy of Swabia. It was established in the early 12th century and dedicated to Saint Pancras.

== History ==
The abbey was founded before 1116 by Herman II, Margrave of Baden, and his wife, Judith of Backnang. Pope Paschal I confirmed the foundation in 1116. As early as 1123, though, the monastery had to be revived with the help of canons from Marbach Abbey in Alsace.

Between 1123 and 1243, the abbey was the burial place of the Zähringen Margraves of Baden, a connection which brought much influence and prosperity. However, Backnang's geographical position exposed it to attack by the Counts of Württemberg during the 13th century. For this reason, Margravine Irmengard transferred the remains of her late husband (Herman V, Margrave of Baden) in 1243 to her foundation of Lichtenthal Abbey in the town of Baden-Baden.

In 1297, possession of Backnang passed to Württemberg. In 1366, Count Eberhard II of Württemberg succeeded in gaining control of the abbey's finances. In 1477, it was changed into a secular collegiate chapter, with the approval of Pope Sixtus IV.

In 1535, as part of the Protestant Reformation, the community was dissolved. The canons of Backnang, however, by making a complaint to Emperor Charles V, obtained permission to reoccupy it, which they did in 1551. The last of them died in 1593, when the house was finally suppressed.

The abbey church (Stiftskirche) still stands in Backnang.
