= Duchy of Styria =

Part of Holy Roman Empire, Austria-Hungary

Coordinates: 47.0667°N 15.4333°E

Duchy of Styria Herzogtum Steiermark (German) Vojvodina Štajerska (Slovene) Ducatus Styriae (Latin)
- 1180–1918
- Coat of arms

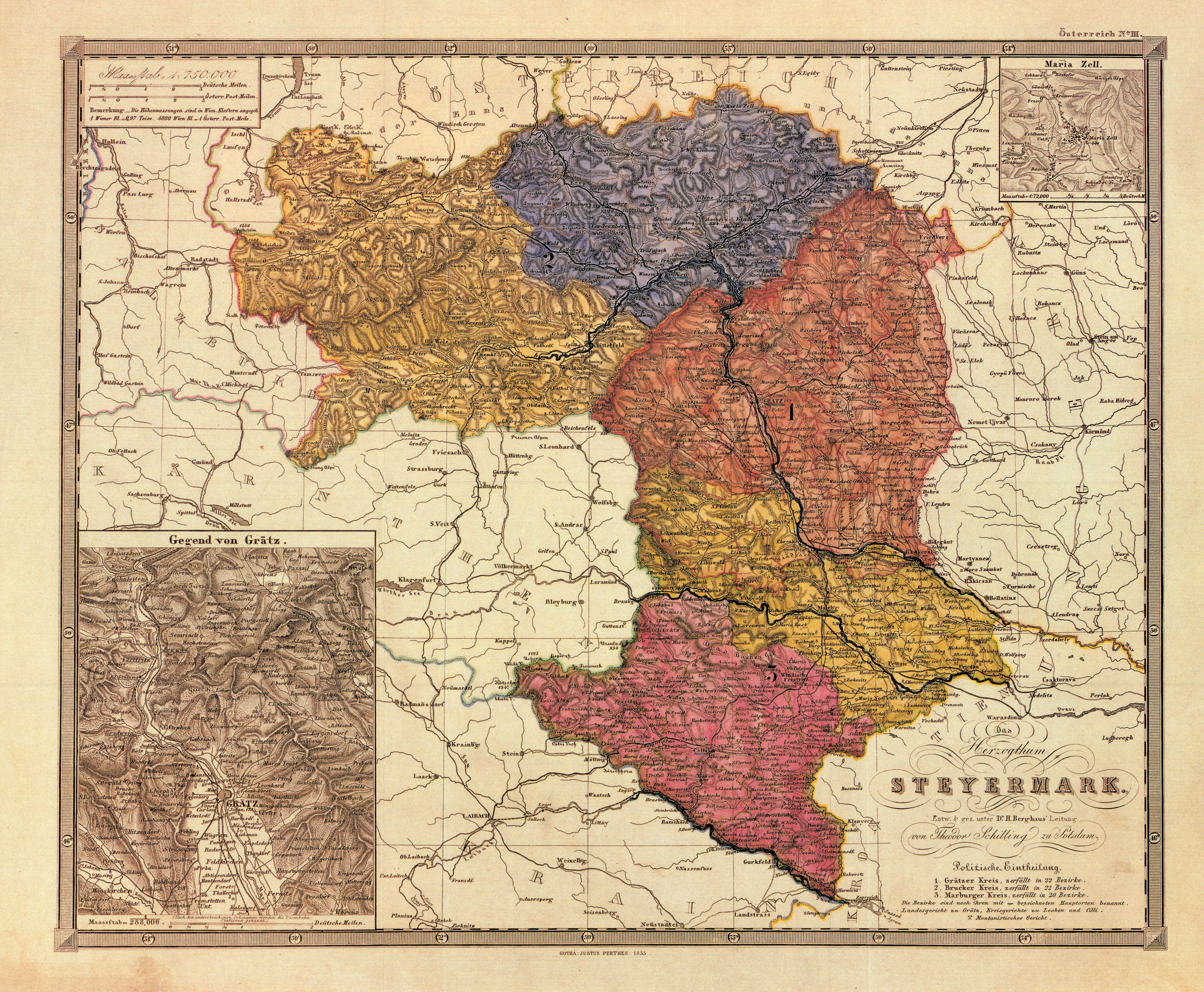
- Map of the Duchy of Styria from 1850 to 1910
- Status: State of the Holy Roman Empire and the Austrian Empire; Kronland of Cisleithanian Austria
- Capital: Graz
- Religion: Roman Catholicism
- Government: Duchy
- Historical era: Middle Ages
  - Styrian March partitioned from Carinthian March: 970
  - Raised to duchy by Frederick Barbarossa: 1180
  - To Babenberg Austria*: 1192
  - To Árpád Hungary*: 1254
  - To Přemyslid Bohemia†: 1260
  - To Habsburg Austria†: 1276/78
  - Austria-Hungary dissolved: 31 October 1918
  - Collapse of German Austria: 10 September 1919
Preceded by	Succeeded by
March of Styria	State of Styria; Kingdom of Yugoslavia
- Today part of: Austria; Slovenia
- * Transferred by inheritance on the extinction of the ducal line. † Transferred by conquest.

The Duchy of Styria (German: Herzogtum Steiermark; Slovene: Vojvodina Štajerska; Latin: Ducatus Styriae) was a duchy located in modern-day southern Austria and northern Slovenia. It was a part of the Holy Roman Empire until its dissolution in 1806 and a Cisleithanian crown land of Austria-Hungary until its dissolution in 1918.

== History ==
It was created by Emperor Frederick Barbarossa in 1180 when he raised the March of Styria to a duchy of equal rank with neighbouring Carinthia and Bavaria, after the fall of the Bavarian Duke Henry the Lion earlier that year. Margrave Ottokar IV thereby became the first duke of Styria and also the last of the ancient Otakar dynasty. As Ottokar had no issue, he in 1186 signed the Georgenberg Pact with the mighty House of Babenberg, rulers of Austria since 976, after which both duchies should in perpetuity be ruled in personal union. Upon his death in 1192, Styria as stipulated fell to the Babenberg Leopold V, Duke of Austria.

Arms of the House of Babenberg

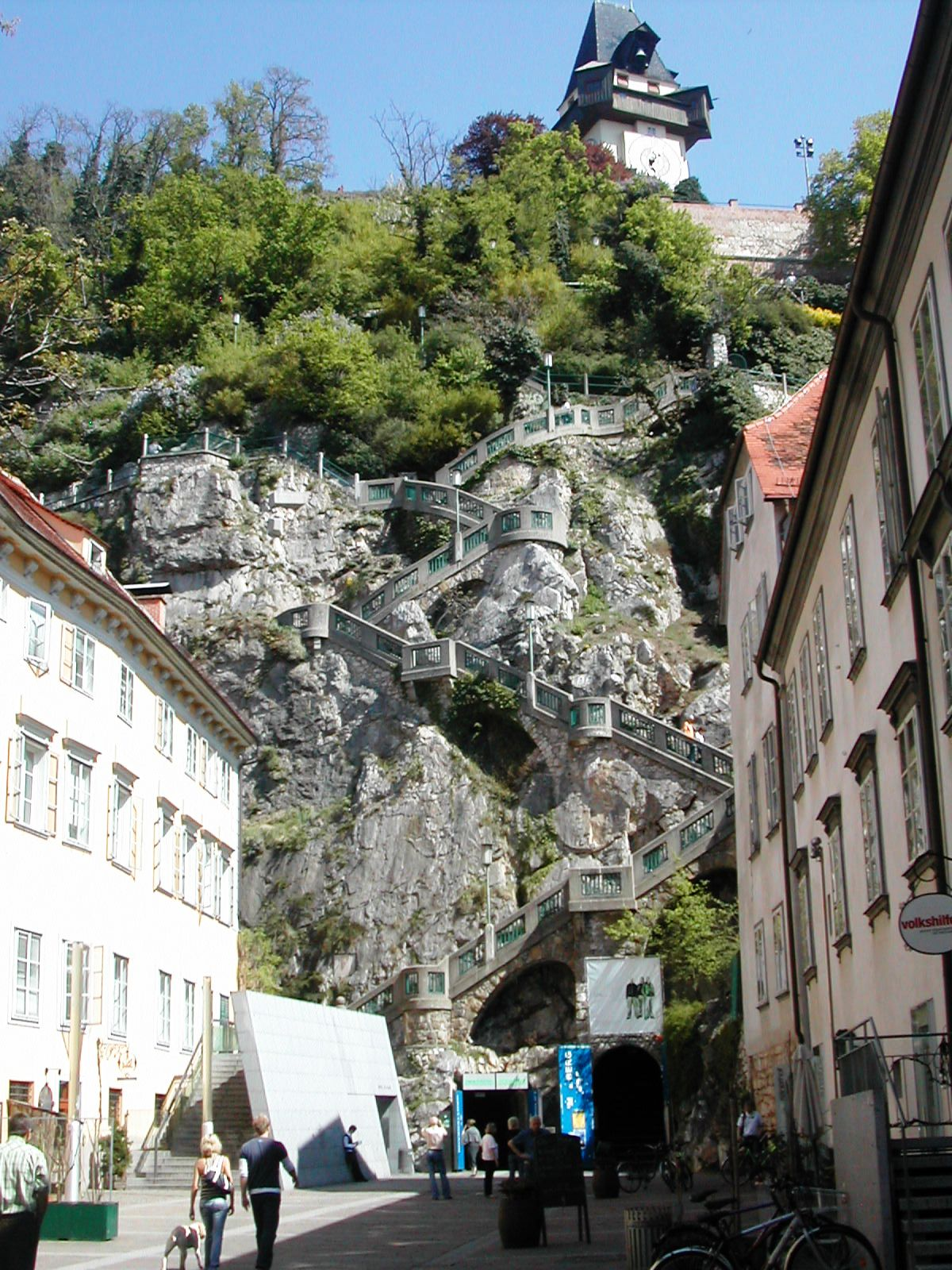
Grazer Schlossberg

The Austrian Babenbergs became extinct in 1246, when Duke Frederick II was killed in battle against King Béla IV of Hungary. Styria, a vacant Imperial fief, became a matter of dispute among the neighbouring estates. It passed quickly through the hands of Hungarian kings in 1254, until King Ottokar II of Bohemia conquered it, being victorious at the 1260 Battle of Kressenbrunn. As King Ottokar II had married the last duke's sister Margaret, he laid claim to both Austria and Styria. This met with strong opposition by the newly-elected King Rudolph I of Germany, who claimed the duchies as escheated fiefs. Rudolph finally defeated Ottokar at the 1278 Battle on the Marchfeld, seized Austria and Styria and granted them to his sons Albert I and Rudolf II.

The House of Habsburg provided Styria with dukes of their lineage from that point on. The duchy was, however, separated from Austria by the 1379 Treaty of Neuberg, after which Styria, Carinthia, and Carniola formed the Inner Austrian territory ruled by the descendants of Leopold III of the Leopoldian line, who took their residence at Graz. In 1456 they could significantly enlarge the Styrian territory by acquisition and re-acquisition of the comital Celje estates in Lower Styria. Both duchies were again ruled in personal union, when Leopold's grandson Frederick V inherited Austria in 1457. In 1496 Frederick's son Maximilian I signed an order expelling all Jews from Styria, who were not allowed to return to Graz until 1856. In 1512 the duchy joined the Empire's Austrian Circle.

A second Inner Austrian cadet branch of the Habsburgs ruled over Styria from 1564. Under Archduke Charles II of Inner Austria, Graz became a centre of the Counter-Reformation, expedited by the Jesuits at the University of Graz established in 1585 and continued under Charles' son Archduke Ferdinand II, who became sole rule of all Habsburg hereditary lands and Holy Roman Emperor in 1619. The Protestant population was expelled, including the astronomer Johannes Kepler in 1600. Meanwhile, at the time of the Ottoman invasions in the 16th and 17th centuries after the 1526 Battle of Mohács, the land suffered severely and was depopulated. The Turks made incursions into Styria nearly twenty times; churches, monasteries, cities, and villages were destroyed and plundered, while the population was either killed or carried away into slavery.

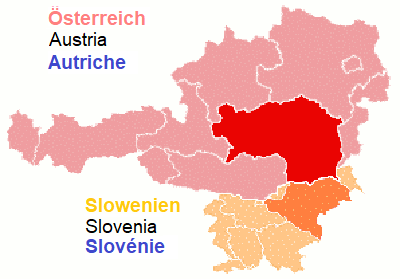
The Duchy of Styria (dark red, dark orange) in modern Austria and Slovenia

Styria remained a part of the Habsburg monarchy and from 1804 belonged to the Austrian Empire. The development of the duchy was decisively promoted by Archduke John of Austria, younger brother of Emperor Francis I, who in 1811 founded the Joanneum, predecessor of the Graz University of Technology, and the University of Leoben in 1840. He also forwarded the construction of the Semmering railway to Mürzzuschlag and the Austrian Southern Railway line from Vienna to Trieste completed in 1857, which boosted the Styrian economy. In the course of the Austro-Hungarian Compromise of 1867 (Ausgleich), the duchy was assigned as a crown land for the Cisleithanian part of Austria-Hungary, while along with the rise of nationalism the conflict between the German and Slovene population intensified.

Upon the collapse of Austria-Hungary in the aftermath of World War I, the rump state of German Austria claimed all Cisleithanian Austria with a significant German-speaking population including large parts of the Styrian duchy, while the Slovene Lower Styrian part joined the State of Slovenes, Croats and Serbs. Conflicts arose especially around the majority German-speaking border-town of Maribor (Marburg an der Drau), where the census in 1900 recorded 83.5% German-speakers, which after a massacre of German protestors awaiting the American delegation, popularly known as "Marburg's Bloody Sunday", although it was actually a Monday, ultimately fell to Yugoslavia. The former duchy was partitioned broadly along ethnic lines, though where mixed, the defeated Austrian side lost the lands to Yugoslavia, such as the majority-German Abstall basin, with only the entirely German-speaking two thirds of its territory (Upper Styria and parts of Central Styria) remaining with Austria, and the southern third of Lower Styria with Maribor passing to the Kingdom of Serbs, Croats and Slovenes, eventually becoming part of modern Slovenia.

== Name ==
Styria was attested in historical documents in AD 907 as Styria, in 1191 as Marchia Stirensis, and in 1215 as Marchia Styrie. The name is of pre-Romance substrate origin. The German name Steiermark is a compound; the first element is borrowed from the ancient name Stiria and the second element, Mark, means 'march, border region'. The Slovene name Štajerska and the Czech name Štýrsko are borrowed and adapted from the German name for the region.

== Demographics ==
In 1910 the population of Styria included:

- 983,000 speakers of German
- 409,000 speakers of Slovene

== Dukes ==
=== Various dynasties ===
Otakars

- Ottokar IV (1180–1192), had been the Margrave of Styria since 1164.

House of Babenberg

- Leopold V of Austria (1192–1194)
- Leopold VI of Austria (1194–1230), son
- Frederick II of Austria (1230–1246), son, killed in battle

Přemyslids

- Ottokar II of Bohemia (1251/1260–1278), against

Árpád dynasty

- Béla IV of Hungary (1254–1258) and his son
- Stephen V of Hungary (1258–1260), claimants

=== House of Habsburg ===
- Rudolph I (1278–1282), also King of the Romans 1273–1291
- Albert I (1282–1308), son, also King of the Romans from 1298, jointly with his brother
  - Rudolph II (1282–1283) and his son
  - Rudolph III (1298–1307)
- Frederick the Fair (1308–1330), son of Albert I, jointly with his brother
  - Leopold I (1308–1326)
- Albert II (1330–1358), son of Albert I, jointly with his brother
  - Otto the Merry (1330–1339)
- Rudolph IV (1358–1365), son of Albert II
- Albert III (1365–1379), son of Albert II, jointly with his brother
  - Leopold III (1365–1386), Duke of Inner Austria from 1379

Leopoldian line

- William (1386–1406), son of Leopold III
- Ernest the Iron (1406–1424), son of Leopold III
- Frederick V (1424–1493), son of Ernest the Iron, also King of the Romans from 1440, Holy Roman Emperor from 1452 and Archduke of Austria from 1457, jointly with his brother
  - Albert VI (1424–1463)
- Maximilian I (1493–1519), also Archduke of Austria, Holy Roman Emperor (Emperor-elect) from 1508
- Charles I (1519–1521), also Archduke of Austria, Holy Roman Emperor 1530-1556
- Ferdinand I (1521–1564), also Archduke of Austria, Holy Roman Emperor from 1558
- Charles II (1564–1590), Archduke of Inner Austria
- Ferdinand II (1590–1637), Archduke of Inner Austria, also Archduke of Austria and Holy Roman Emperor from 1619

== See also ==
- History of Styria
