= Judith of Backnang =

German margravine

Judith of Backnang (c. 1080 – c. 1123, in Backnang) was a German margravine, as the wife of Herman II, Margrave of Baden. She was a daughter of Hesso II, Lord of Backnang. As a dowry, she brought the important city of Backnang when she married the Margrave in 1111.
