= Frederick I of Austria (Babenberg) =

Duke of Austria from 1195 to 1198

Frederick I
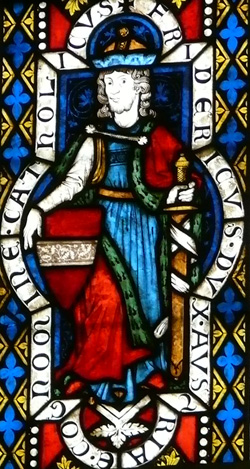
- Frederick I on a 13th century stained glass window in Heiligenkreuz Abbey

Duke of Austria
- Reign: 1195–1198
- Predecessor: Leopold V
- Successor: Leopold VI
- Born: c. 1175
- Died: 26 April 1198 (aged 22–23); Acre, Kingdom of Jerusalem
- Burial: Heiligenkreuz Abbey
- House: House of Babenberg
- Father: Leopold V
- Mother: Helena of Hungary

Frederick I (German: Friedrich I. von Österreich, c. 1175 – 16 April 1198), known as Frederick the Catholic (German: Friedrich der Katholische), was the duke of Austria from 1195 to 1198. He was a member of the House of Babenberg.

== Biography ==
Frederick the Catholic was born in 1175, the son of Duke Leopold V of Austria and Helena of Hungary. In 1192, he was enfeoffed with his father with Austria and Styria, while the younger Leopold VI had no claim. On Leopold V's death-bed, at Graz, he caught all by surprise by granting the Duchy of Styria to Leopold VI, with Emperor Henry VI's approval. None raised objections and thus, Austria and Styria remained divided. Frederick the Catholic, however, did not receive his enfeoffment by the Emperor personally; instead he sent Wolfger of Erla, bishop of Passau, on his behalf.

As the new Duke finally received his land in 1195, he still faced the restitution of the English hostages and the ransom money paid for Richard I of England's life. Richard had been pressing hard for the return of both hostages and money, egged on by Adalbert III of Bohemia, archbishop of Salzburg. The hostages were sent back at once, yet Frederick was unable to pay back the ransom money, despite returning the unspent portion. Upon the captivity of Richard Leopold V had forced Richard's niece Eleanor into a marriage to Frederick and Eleanor was on the way to Austria, but upon this situation the marriage was cancelled and she was also sent back. Frederick willingly took upon himself the penance of another Crusade, in order to restore Babenberg honor in the eyes of the Catholic Church. And on Easter, 31 March 1195, he took the cross at Bari. With Saladin dead, in 1193, the prospects were favorable. Yet by March 1196, Pope Celestine III had intervened, approving of Adalbert's conduct and severely censuring the late Duke Leopold V.

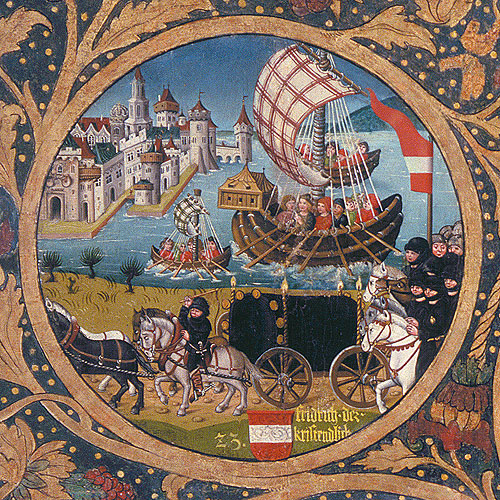
Frederick I in the German Crusade of 1197, Babenberger Stammbaum, Klosterneuburg Monastery, 1489–1492

There were long delays before the Crusade would go under way. The emperor had been opting for his Erbreichsplan, a plan to make the Empire hereditary. He had been spending this time making deals, offering bribes and whatever means he could to both princes of the Church and Empire to vote for a hereditary empire, to no avail. In the end, the emperor ceased his hereditary plans to proceed with the Crusade.

Duke Frederick left Austria in April or late spring 1197 for the German Crusade of 1197 in the company of the bishop of Passau and his uncle, Henry I, Duke of Mödling. Frederick had stopped by Linaria to rest before moving on. When they left Apulia to reach Sicily, they were encouraged further, after two ships sunk at sea, with the Abbots of Werd and Beuern. By June, they were welcomed at Emperor Henry's court in Sicily. There the emperor took full command and instructed Conrad of Mainz to oversee the passage of the Crusader fleet. In September, they sailed under the leadership of Conrad, Archbishop of Mainz & Chancellor of Germany from Messina and arrived weeks later to Acre, where command of the German forces was assumed under Conrad of Mainz and Marshal Henry of Kalden, whose presence brought the displeasure of the French forces under Queen Isabella I of Jerusalem. The German princes, however, Frederick included, had denied the authority of Marshal Henry and had called for an election of a Commander. They called for Duke Henry I of Brabant to lead the assault against the Ayyubids under Al-Adil. Their forces rallied, and they marched on to Tyre, taking the city easily and then the wealthy city of Sidon before then invading Beirut and entering it on 24 October. Suddenly, news spread that the ruler of the Kingdom of Jerusalem, Count Henry II of Champagne, had died from falling off the balcony of his palace in Acre. The German forces returned immediately to Acre and Duke Henry of Brabant acted as Regent. Time was not wasted and preparations were made to have Aimery of Cyprus crowned king of Jerusalem. Urged by the German princes, Aimery married Isabella and was crowned in Acre King of Jerusalem in 1198.

The Germans marched forth again, reconquering the estates around Byblos Castle (Gibelet) and restoring the land link to the County of Tripoli. They marched against Damascus and even laid siege to Toron when suddenly, news had arrived of Emperor Henry VI's death on Michaelmas Eve. Many German princes had immediately left for the homeland to receive confirmation of their lands by the new emperor. Duke Frederick stayed on, with Wolfger, to continue the war. In the end, Frederick, along with the remaining Germans, had called for an armistice with Al-Adil, who acknowledged King Aimery's rule over the reconquered lands.

Frederick fell ill and died on 16 April while returning from Palestine at Acre. Those who bore witness to his death were his companions, Count Meinhard II of Gorizia, the bishop of Passau, Eberhard, Count of Dörnberg, Ulrich of Eppan and his most trusted attendant. He never married, but was very much beloved by his people, one such being Walther von der Vogelweide, who lamented him especially as Duke Leopold VI gave Walther a less cordial reception at his court.

Wolfger performed the German funeral custom, Mos Teutonicus, on him before bringing him back. He was then interred next to his father in Heiligenkreuz Abbey where they remain to this day, in peace.

== See also ==
- List of rulers of Austria

Frederick I of Austria (Babenberg) House of Babenberg Born: c. 1175 Died: 1198
German royalty
Preceded by Leopold V	Duke of Austria; 1195–1198	Succeeded by Leopold VI
