= Patriarchate of Aquileia =

Catholic patriarchate in north-eastern Italy until 18th century

Coordinates: 45°46′N 13°22′E

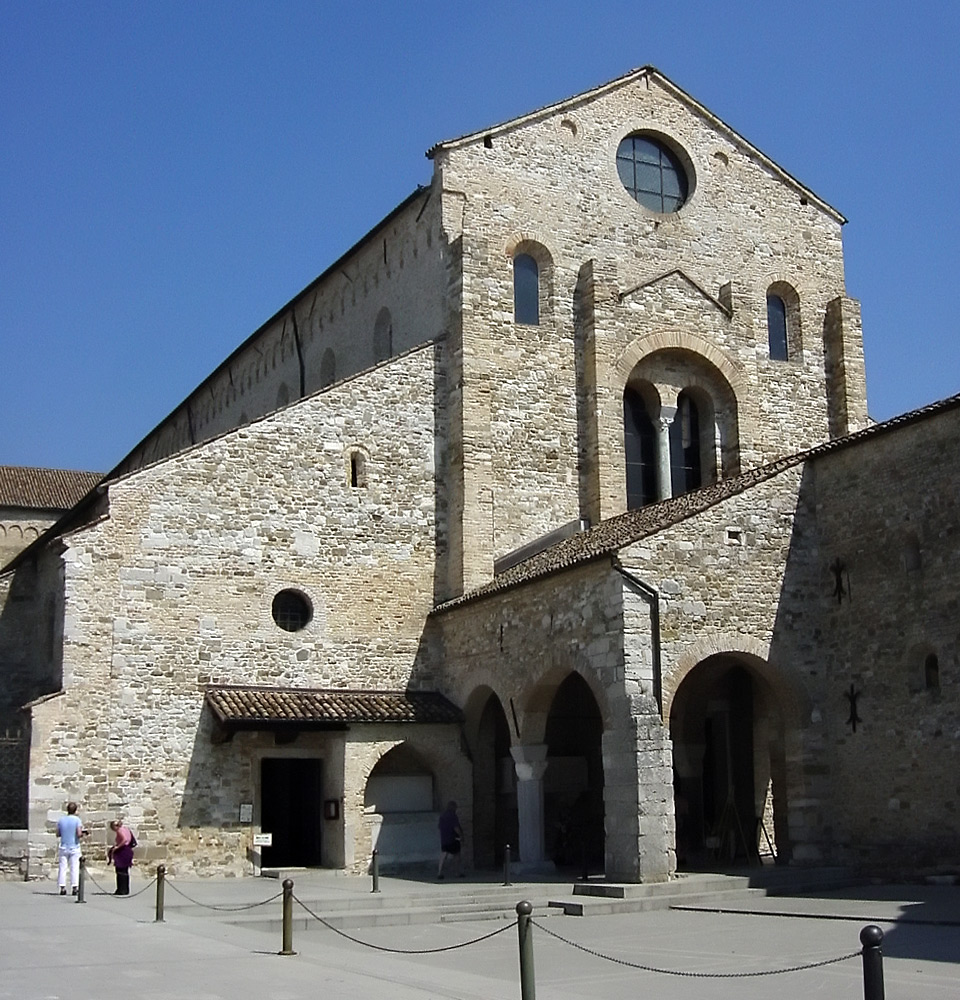
Basilica di Santa Maria Assunta in Aquileia

The Patriarchate of Aquileia was an episcopal see and ecclesiastical province in northeastern Italy, originally centered in the ancient city of Aquileia, situated near the northern coast of the Adriatic Sea. It emerged in the 4th century as a metropolitan province, with jurisdiction over the Italian region of Venetia et Histria. In the second half of the 6th century, metropolitan bishops of Aquileia started to use the patriarchal title. Their residence was moved to Grado in 568, after the Lombard conquest of Aquileia. In 606, an internal schism occurred, and since that time there were two rival lines of Aquileian patriarchs: one in New Aquileia (Grado) with jurisdiction over the Byzantine-controlled coastal regions, and the other in Old Aquileia (later moved to Cormons). The first line (Grado) continued until 1451, while the second line (Cormons, later Cividale, and then Udine) continued until 1751. Patriarchs of the second line were also feudal lords of the Patriarchal State of Aquileia. A number of Aquileian church councils were held during the late antiquity and throughout the middle ages. Today, it is a titular archiepiscopal see.

== History ==
=== From bishopric to patriarchate ===
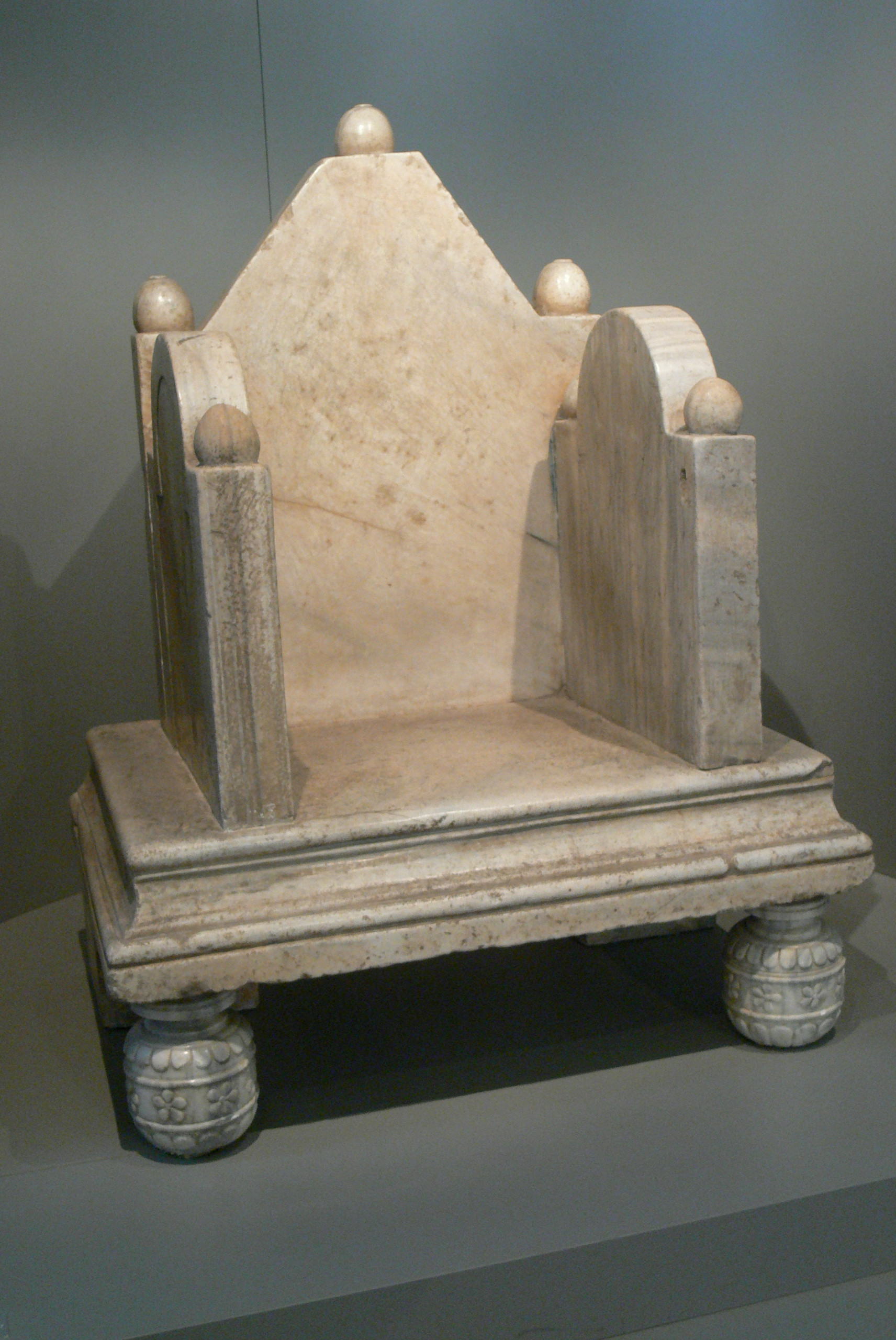
Aquileian patriarchal throne from the 11th-century

Ancient tradition asserts that the see was founded by St. Mark, sent there by St. Peter, prior to his mission to Alexandria. St. Hermagoras is said to have been its first bishop and to have died a martyr's death (c. 70). At the end of the third century (285) another martyr, St. Helarus (or St. Hilarius), was bishop of Aquileia.

In the course of the fourth century the city was the chief ecclesiastical centre for the region of the head of the Adriatic, Regio X of the Roman emperor Augustus' eleven regions of Italy, "Venetia et Histria". In 381, St. Valerian appeared as Metropolitan bishop of the churches in this territory; his synod of that year, held against the Arians, was attended by 32 (or 24) bishops. Valerian was succeeded by Chromatius (388–408), known for his homiletic and exegetical works. He promoted the work of Jerome and Rufinus and kept contact with Ambrose of Milan and John Chrysostom.

In time, part of western Illyria, and to the north, Noricum and Rhaetia, came under the jurisdiction of Aquileia. Roman cities like Verona, Trent, Pola, Belluno, Feltre, Vicenza, Treviso and Padua were among its suffragans in the 5th and 6th centuries. As metropolitans of such an extensive territory, and representatives of Roman civilization among the Ostrogoths and Lombards, the archbishops of Aquileia sought and obtained from their barbarian masters the honorific title of patriarch, personal, however, as yet to each titular of the see. This title aided in promoting and at the same time justifying the strong tendency towards independence that was quite manifest in the relations of Aquileia with Rome, a trait it shared with its rival, Ravenna, which, less fortunate, never obtained the patriarchal dignity.

Emperor Justinian's decision that Italy, too, should adopt his religious policy which favoured Monophysitism, was met with strong opposition by Aquileia's bishop Macedonius (539–557). In the meantime, Pope Vigilius gave in to Justinian's threats and adhered to the Second Council of Constantinople of 553 which condemned the three representatives later known as the Three Chapters. Owing to the acquiescence of Vigilius in the condemnation of the "Three Chapters", the bishops of northern Italy (Liguria and Aemilia) and among them those of the Venetia and Istria, broke off communion with Rome, under the leadership of Macedonius. This Schism of the Three Chapters provided the opportunity for the bishop of Aquileia to assume the title "patriarch". Macedonius' successor Paulinus I (557–569) began using the title around 560.

Meanwhile, by the end of the next decade, the Lombards overran all of northern Italy. In 568, the patriarch of Aquileia was obliged to flee, with the treasures of his church, to the little island of Grado, near Trieste, a last remnant of the imperial possessions in northern Italy. This political change did not affect the relations of the patriarchate with Rome; its bishops, whether in Lombard or imperial territory, persistently refused all invitations to a reconciliation.

=== Split between old Aquileia and Grado ===
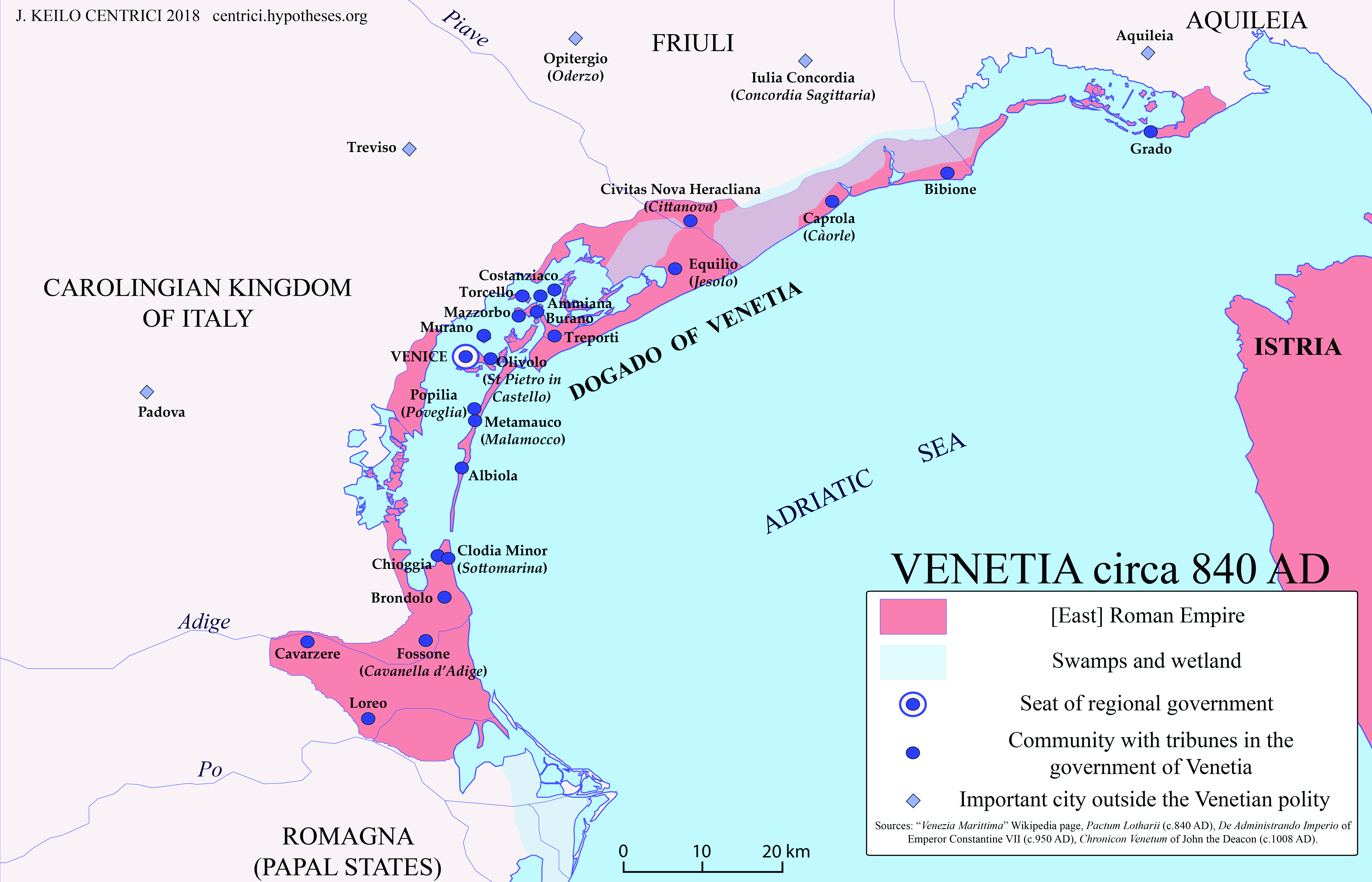
Grado and other Byzantine domains in the North Adriatic (6th-9th centuries)

Various efforts of the popes at Rome and the exarchs at Ravenna, both peaceful and otherwise, met with persistent refusal to renew the bonds of unity until the election of Candidianus (606 or 607) as Metropolitan of Aquileia (in Grado). Weary of fifty years' schism, those of his suffragans whose sees lay within the empire joined him in submission to Rome; his mainland suffragans among the Lombards persisted in the schism. They went further and elected in Aquileia itself, patriarch John the Abbot (606 or 607) so that henceforth there were two little patriarchates in northern Italy, the insular patriarchate of Aquileia in Grado and the mainland patriarchate of Old Aquileia, residing in the fortress of Cormons.

With the death of King Grimuald (671), who was an Arian, attitudes began to change. Royal court officials were prevalently Catholic and favoured an agreement with the Church of Rome. Eventually the Lombard kings wished to remove all conflicts with Rome, including the schism with the Aquileian church. Gradually the schism lost its vigour. King Cunipert summoned the Synod of Pavia (698/699) whereby Old-Aquileia reconciled with Rome, and Pope Gregory II granted the pallium to Patriarch Serenus (715–730) of Aquileia in 723. It was probably during the seventh century that the popes recognized in the metropolitans of Grado the title of Patriarch of Aquileia, in order to offset its assumption by the metropolitans of Old-Aquileia. In succeeding centuries it continued in use by both, but had no longer any practical significance.

In 628, the patriarchs of Old-Aquileia transferred their residence to Cormons. Patriarch Callistus moved the patriarchal residence to Cividale del Friuli (Forum Julii) in 737 and it remained there until the thirteenth century when it was moved again, this time to Udine in 1223.

=== Rivalry between old Aquileia and Grado ===
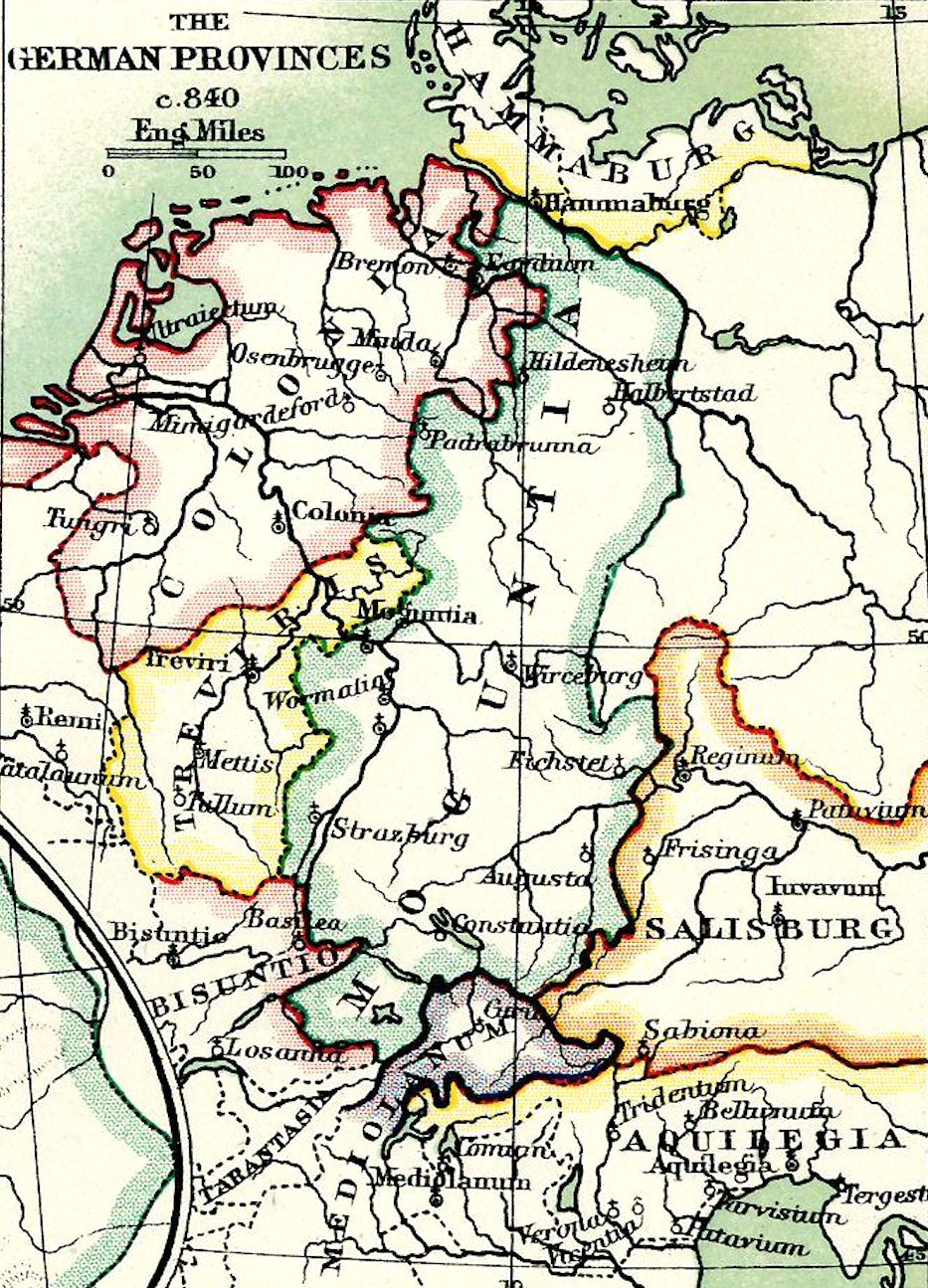
Ecclesiastical provinces, including Aquileia, in the middle of the 9th century

In 774, the region was incorporated into the Carolingian monarchy, and by the end of the 8th century a new metropolitan see at Salzburg was created, thus reducing the size of the ecclesiastical province of Old-Aquileia, which long claimed as its own the territory of Carinthia and other northeastern regions. Patriarch Ursus of Aquileia (d. 811) accepted the arbitration of Charlemagne, by which the Carinthian territory north of the Drave was relinquished to Arno of Salzburg. After the death of Ursus, Maxentius solicited funds from Charlemagne's court to rebuild Aquileia. Maxentius served as the Patriarch of Aquileia from 811 till his death in 837.

Nevertheless, the Hungarian invasion of the 9th century and the decline of imperial control increased the authority of the patriarchs.

German feudal influence was henceforth more and more tangible in the ecclesiastical affairs of Old-Aquileia. In 1011 one of its patriarchs, John IV, surrounded by thirty bishops, consecrated the new cathedral of Bamberg. Poppo, or Wolfgang (1019–1042), a familiar and minister of Emperor Conrad II, consecrated his own cathedral at Aquileia on 13 July 1031, in honour of the Blessed Virgin Mary. Under his reign the city also received a new line of walls. Poppo also managed to free the patriarch definitively from the Duchy of Carinthia and warred against Grado.

In 1047, the Patriarch Eberhard, a German, assisted at the Roman synod of that year, in which it was declared that Aquileia was inferior in honour only to Rome, Ravenna, and Milan. In 1063, however, Pope Leo IX declared Grado to have the supremacy, but Gotebald retained the support of Emperor Henry III.

=== Two powers of old Aquileia: ecclesiastical and temporal ===
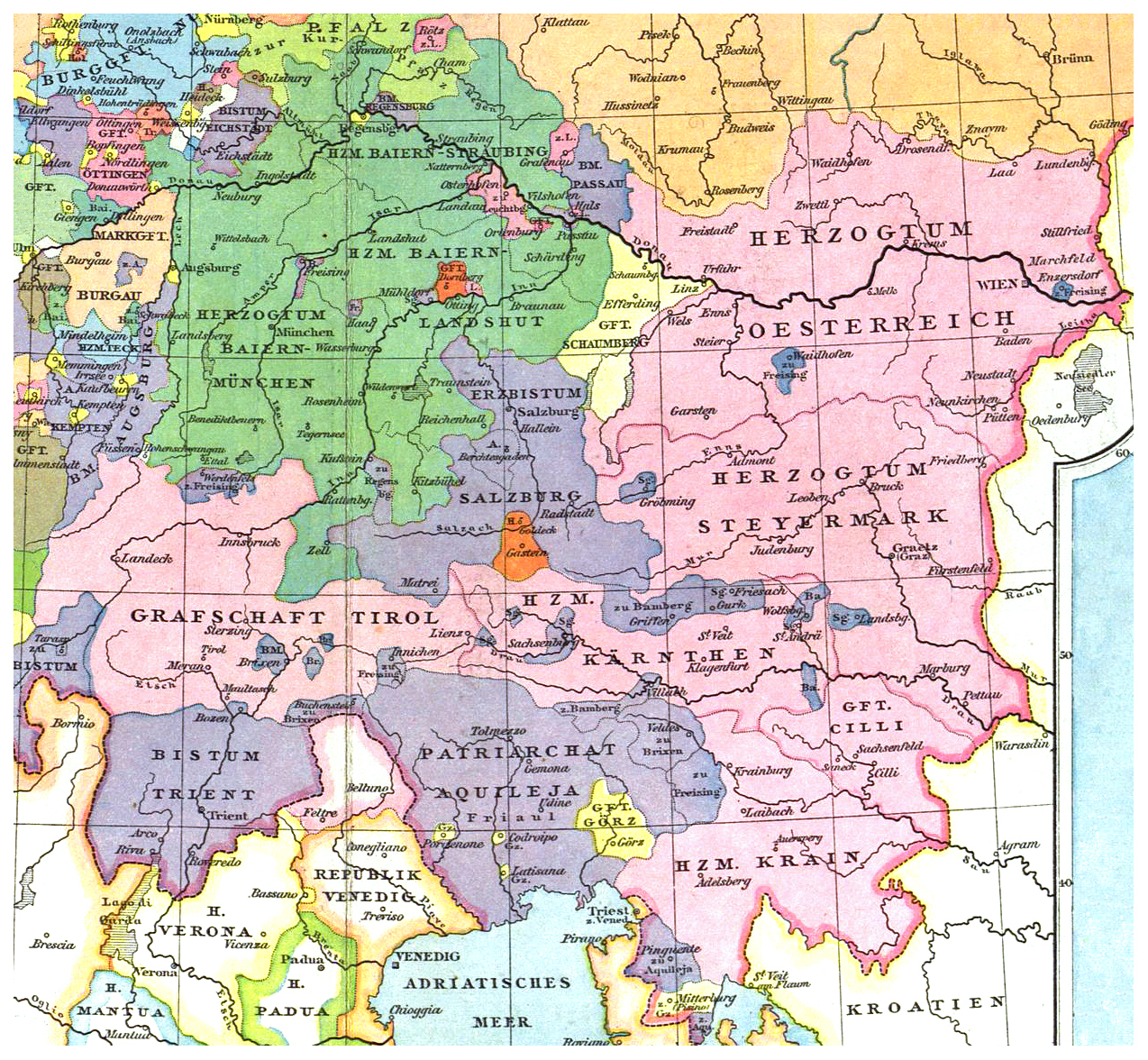
Aquileian temporal domains: the Patriarchal State of Aquileia and its neighbors in the middle of the 14th century

In 1077, the patriarch Sieghard of Belstein received the ducal title of Friuli from German king Henry IV, an act traditionally regarded as the birth of the Patriarchal State of Aquileia, known in Italian as Patria del Friuli. The Patriarchal state subsequently extended its political control in the area: regions under Aquileian control in the following centuries also included Trieste, Cadore, central parts of Istria, and minor possessions throughout Carniola and Carinthia. At its maximum height, the Patriarchal state of Aquileia was one of the largest states in Italy. Noblemen from the Patriarchal state were also protagonists in the Crusades. In 1186 Patriarch Godfrey crowned Frederick Barbarossa's son, Henry VI, in the Basilica of Sant'Ambrogio in Milan as King of Italy; in retaliation, Pope Urban III deposed him.

In 1180, a long standing dispute between patriarchates of old Aquileia and Grado over jurisdiction in Istria was resolved by mutual agreement, in favor of old Aquileia.

In the early 13th century, particularly under Wolfger von Erla (1204–1218) and Berthold (1218–1251), the Patriarchate had a flourishing industry and commerce, favoured by a good road network, as well as a notable cultural activity. Damaged by earthquakes and other calamities, and reduced to a few hundred inhabitants, Aquileia was nearly abandoned in the 14th century. The capital of the state was moved first to Cividale and then, from 1238, to Udine, in central Friuli, which had been a favourite residence of the patriarch since the 13th century and soon became a large city.

However, late in the century, the Patriarchate had to face the increasing power of the Republic of Venice, as well as the inner strifes between its vassals, and also became entangled in the endless wars between Guelphs and Ghibellines. A recovery occurred during the rule of Bertrand (1334–1350), a successful administrator and military leader. He was killed in 1350 in a plot, at the age of ninety.

Since the transfer of the patriarchal residence to Udine the Venetians had never lived in peace with the patriarchate, of whose imperial favour and tendencies they were jealous. In the 15th century the state also suffered a series of inner strifes between Cividale and Udine. In 1411 this turned into a war which was to mark the end of the Patriarchal state, Cividale having received support from most of the Friulian communes, the da Carrara of Padua, the Emperor and the King of Hungary, while the latter was backed by the Venetians. In the December of that year the imperial army captured Udine and, in the following January, Louis of Teck was created Patriarch in the city's cathedral. On 23 July 1419 the Venetians conquered Cividale and prepared to do the same with Udine. The city fell on 7 June 1420 after a long siege. Soon afterwards Gemona, San Daniele, Venzone and Tolmezzo followed. Venetians thus annexed the territory, depriving the Patriarch of Aquileia of his temporal powers.

In 1445, after the defeated patriarch Ludovico Trevisan at the Council of Florence had acquiesced in the loss of his ancient temporal estate, in return for an annual salary of 5,000 ducats allowed him from the Venetian treasury, the war was finally over. The former Friulian state was incorporated in the Republic of Venice with the name of Patria del Friuli, ruled by a General Proveditor or a Luogotenente living in Udine.

=== Suppression of Grado and decline of old Aquileia ===
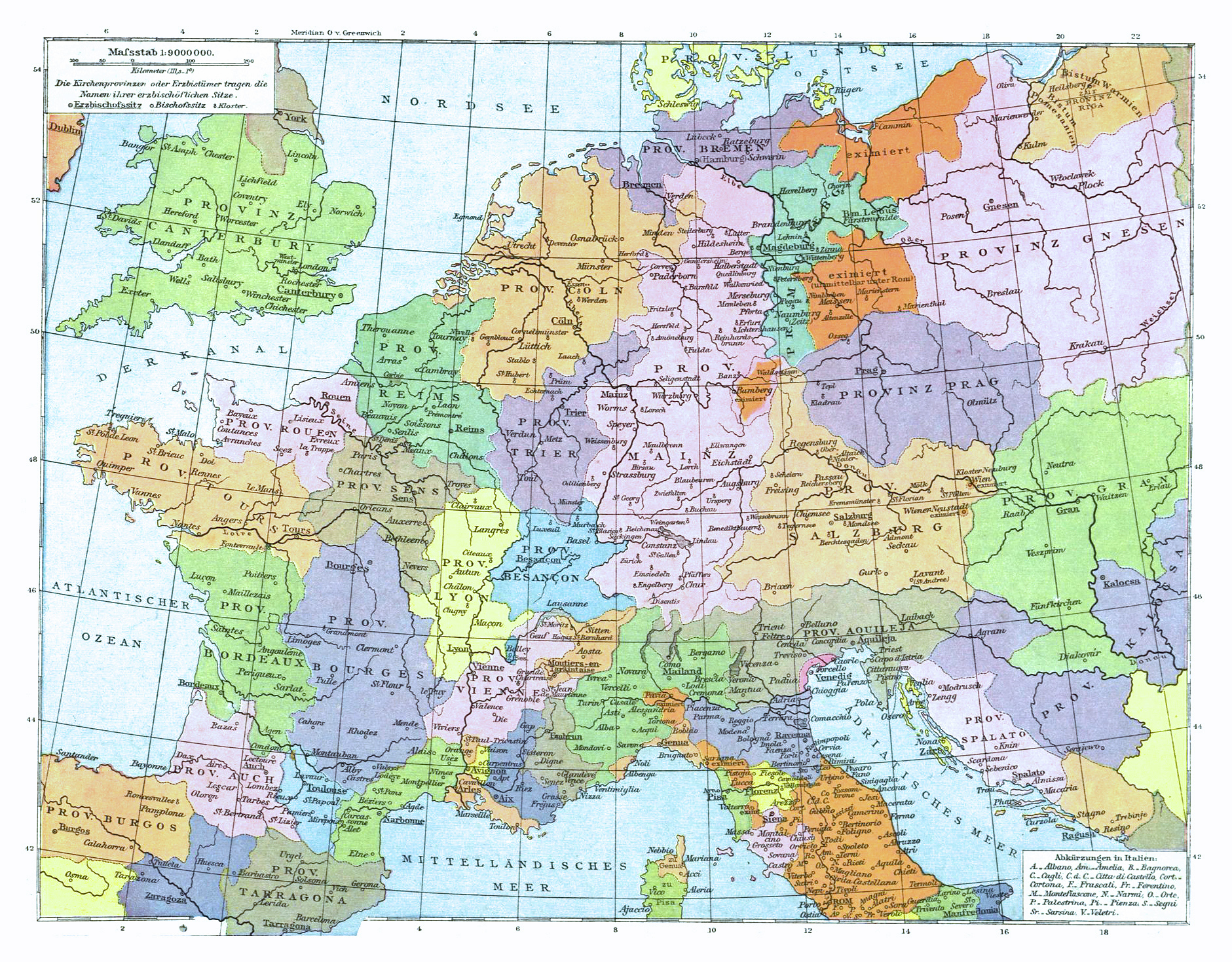
Aquileian ecclesiastical province and its neighbors, around 1500

In 1451, the Patriarchate of Grado (new Aquileia) was suppressed, and replaced by the Patriarchate of Venice, that kept Aquileian historical claims and traditions of Grado.

In the same time, Patriarchs of old Aquileia, deprived of their previous temporal powers, continued to exercise their ecclesiastical jurisdiction. Under Domenico Grimani (cardinal since 1497), Austrian parts of Friuli were added to the territory of the patriarchate whose jurisdiction thus extended over some Austrian dioceses. In 1623 provost of Aquileia Albert Pessler, on behalf of Ferdinand II, Holy Roman Emperor, requested establishment of the Bishopric of Gorizia and removing the Austrian dioceses from jurisdiction of the Patriarchate of Aquileia.

The 109th and last Patriarch of old Aquileia was Daniel Dolfin, coadjutor since 1714 of his predecessor, Dionigio Dolfin, his successor since 1734, and a cardinal since 1747.

The Venetian claim to the nomination of the Patriarch of Aquileia had been met by a counter-claim on the part of Austria since the end of the fifteenth century when Austrian dioceses came to be included within the jurisdiction of the patriarchate.

Finally, Benedict XIV was chosen as arbiter. He awarded (1748–49) to the Archdiocese of Udine the Venetian territory in Friuli, and for the Austrian possessions he created a vicariate apostolic with residence at Gorizia, independent of the Patriarch of Aquileia, and exempt (i.e., immediately dependent on the Holy See), in whose name all jurisdiction was exercised.

This decision was not satisfactory to Venice, and in 1751 with the 6 July bull Injunctio Nobis, the Pope divided the patriarchate into two archdioceses; one at Udine, with Venetian Friuli for its territory, the other at Gorizia, with jurisdiction over Austrian Friuli. Of the ancient patriarchate, once so proud and influential, there remained but the parish church of Aquileia. It was made immediately subject to the Apostolic See and to its rector was granted the right of using episcopal insignia seven times in the year.

=== Titular see ===
In 1968, Aquileia was inserted into the Catholic Church's list of titular (no longer residential) sees with metropolitan rank. As of 2014, the see is held by Charles John Brown, currently Apostolic Nuncio to the Philippines, who was appointed to the see on 26 November 2011.

== See also ==
- Patriarchate of New Aquileia
- Patriarchate of Old Aquileia
- Patriarchal State of Aquileia
- Aquileian rite
- List of bishops and patriarchs of Aquileia
- Titular Archbishop of Aquileia

== Sources ==
- Banić, Josip; Blancato, Sebastiano (2023). "The Agreement between the Patriarchate of Grado and the Patriarchate of Aquileia Regarding the Metropolitan Jurisdiction over Istrian Bishoprics (24th of July, 1180): New Critical Edition of the Charter" (PDF). Zgodovinski časopis. 77 (167): 8–37. Archived from the original on 2025-06-10.
- Cerno, Marianna (2017). "Holding the Aquileian patriarchate's title: The key role of local early-ninth-century hagiography". Imperial Spheres and the Adriatic: Byzantium, the Carolingians and the Treaty of Aachen (812). London & New York: Routledge. pp. 140–151.
- Dursteler, Eric, ed. (2013). A Companion to Venetian History, 1400-1797. Leiden-Boston: Brill.
- Härtel, Reinhard (2025). Die älteren Urkunden des Domkapitels zu Aquileia und des Klosters Beligna (bis 1250). Vienna: Verlag der Österreichischen Akademie der Wissenschaften, ISBN 978-3-7001-9414-9.
- Krahwinkler, Harald (2005). "Patriarch Fortunatus of Grado and the Placitum of Riziano" (PDF). Acta Histriae. 13 (1): 63–78.
- Luthar, Oto, ed. (2008). The Land Between: A History of Slovenia. Frankfurt am Main: Peter Lang.
- Menis, G. C. (1988). History of Friuli. G. E. A. P. Pordenone.
- Meyendorff, John (1989). Imperial unity and Christian divisions: The Church 450-680 A.D. Crestwood, NY: St. Vladimir's Seminary Press. ISBN 9780881410563.
- Minotto, A. S. (ed.) (1870). Documenta ad Forumjulii patriarchatum Aquileiensem Tergestum Istriam Goritiam Vol. 1. (in Latin). Venice: typis Joh. Cecchini, 1870. [Volume 1 of Acta et diplomata e r. tabulario veneto / studio et opera A. S. Minotto]
- Nicovich, John Mark (2009). "The poverty of the Patriarchate of Grado and the Byzantine-Venetian Treaty of 1082". Mediterranean Historical Review. 24 (1): 1–16. doi:10.1080/09518960903000736. S2CID 153843834.
- Price, Richard M. (2007). "The Three Chapters Controversy and the Council of Chalcedon". The Crisis of the Oikoumene: The Three Chapters and the Failed Quest for Unity in the Sixth-century Mediterranean. Turnhout: Brepols. pp. 17–37. ISBN 9782503515205.
- Shahan, Thomas Joseph (1907). "Aquileia" . In Herbermann, Charles (ed.). Catholic Encyclopedia. Vol. 1. New York: Robert Appleton Company.
- Schmidt, Ondřej (2019). John of Moravia between the Czech Lands and the Patriarchate of Aquileia (ca. 1345–1394). Leiden-Boston: Brill.
- Sotinel, Claire (2007). "The Three Chapters and the Transformations of Italy". The Crisis of the Oikoumene: The Three Chapters and the Failed Quest for Unity in the Sixth-century Mediterranean. Turnhout: Brepols. pp. 85–120. ISBN 9782503515205.
- Štih, Peter (2010). The Middle Ages between the Eastern Alps and the Northern Adriatic: Select Papers on Slovene Historiography and Medieval History. Leiden-Boston: Brill.
- Vicelja-Matijašić, Marina (2005). "Byzantium and Istria: Some Aspects of Byzantine Presence in Istria" (PDF). Acta Histriae. 13 (1): 185–204.
- Wickham, Chris (1981). Early Medieval Italy: Central Power and Local Society, 400-1000. Totowa, NJ: Barnes & Noble.
