= Aquileian Schism =

Aquileian Schism may refer to:

- Aquileia-Rome Schism, between the sees of Aquileia and Rome, during the 6th and 7th centuries
- A split within the Aquileian Patriarchate, between the sees of old and new Aquileia (Grado)

== See also ==
- Patriarchate of Grado
- Great Schism (disambiguation)
