= Patriarchate of Aquileia (disambiguation) =

The Patriarchate of Aquileia is an archdiocese. Patriarchate of Aquileia may also refer to the:

- Patria del Friuli, the state in the Holy Roman Empire that lasted between 1077 and 1445
- Patriarchate of Old Aquileia, a split from the Patriarchate
- Patriarchate of Grado, another split from the Patriarchate

== See also ==
- List of bishops and patriarchs of Aquileia
