= Patriarchate of Old Aquileia =

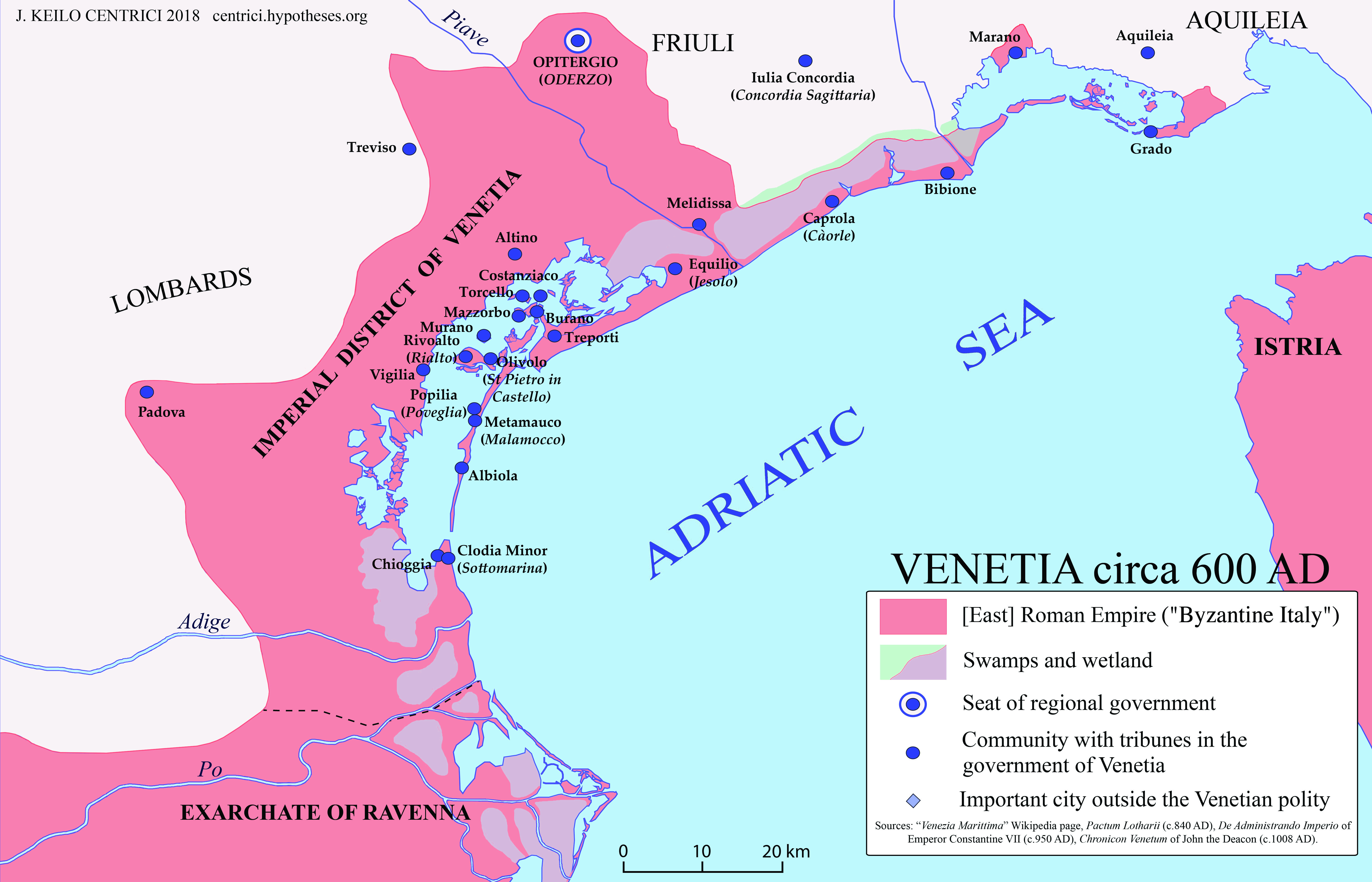
Political division between Byzantine and Lombard possessions in northern Adriatic, at the time of the Aquileian schism (beginning of the 7th century)

The Patriarchate of Old Aquileia was created at the beginning of the 7th century, as a result of an internal schism within the Patriarchate of Aquileia. It was centered in the old Aquileia, that was held by the Lombards, while the rival Patriarchate of New Aquileia in Grado was under the Byzantine rule. Residence of the patriarchs of Old Aquileia was later moved, first to the city of Cormons, then to Cividale, and finally to Udine. Since 1077, patriarchs of Old Aquileia were also temporal lords of the Patriarchal State of Aquileia, that was annexed by the Venetian Republic in the first half of the 15th century, while the Patriarchate of Old Aquileia continued to exist as an ecclesiastical institution until 1751, when it was also abolished.

== History ==
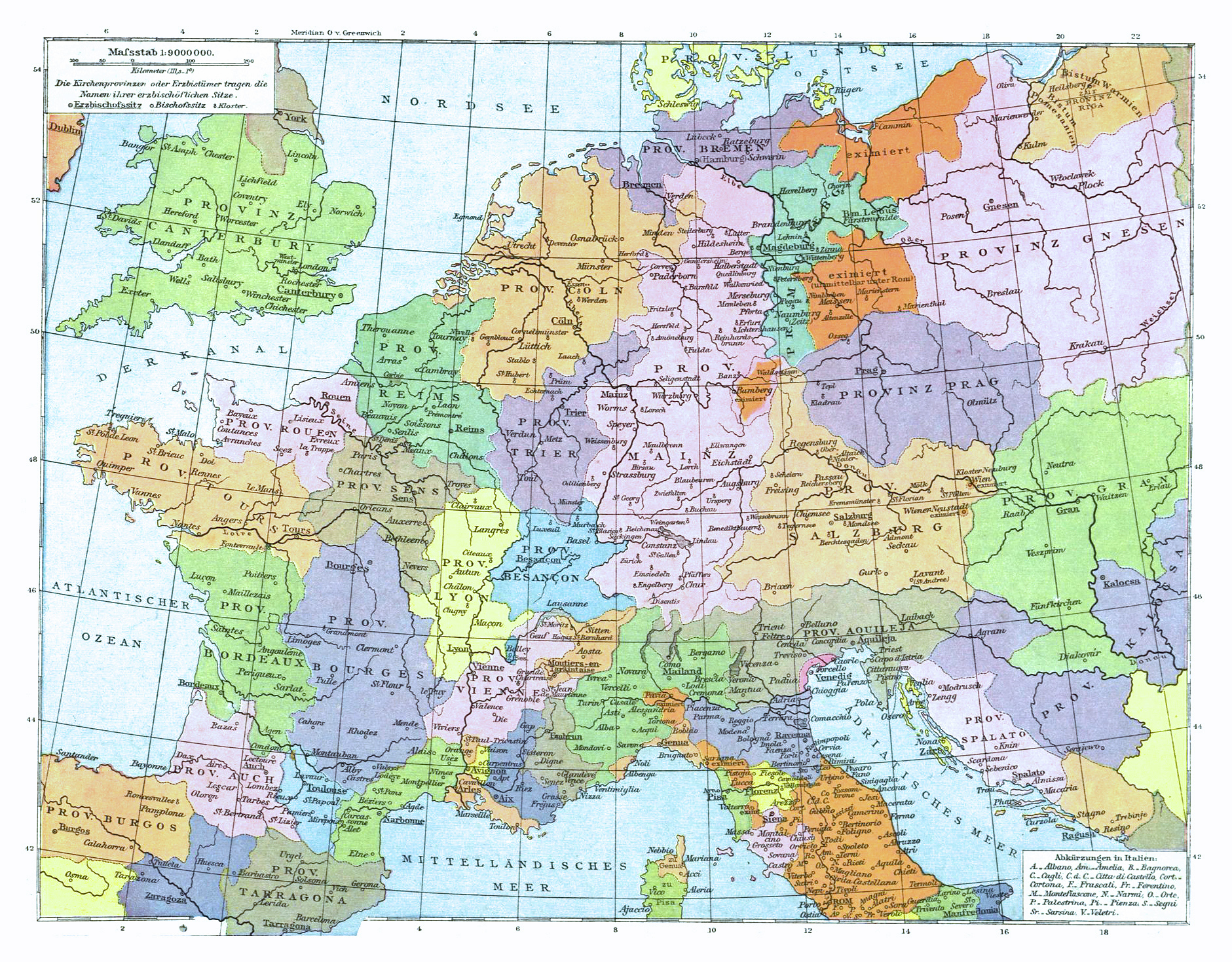
Ecclesiastical province of Old Aquileia (grey), and its neighbors, around 1500

At the beginning of the Schism of the Three Chapters, that occurred in the middle of the 6th century, bishops under the patriarch of Aquileia had split with Rome when they refused to condemn theologians who had been previously condemned by the Fifth Ecumenical Council (553). During the invasion of Italy, Lombard (who were Arians) took Aquileia in 568, and patriarch fled to the island of Grado, still under control of the Byzantine Empire, continuing the schism with Rome.

In 606 the newly elected patriarch of Aquileia, who was residing in Byzantine-held Grado, reconciled with Rome, but many mainland bishops, whose dioceses were under Lombard control were unhappy with the reconciliation. These dissidents elected a rival patriarch, named John, who took residence in Lombard-held Aquileia and maintained the schism with Rome. Thus, two separate patriarchates in northern Italy were created, one centered in old Aquileia, and the other in Grado ("new Aquileia"), while the schism occurred along political Lombard-Byzantine lines.

The Irish missionary Columbanus, who was ministering to the Lombards in Bobbio, was also involved in the first attempt to resolve this division through mediation between 612 and 615. He was persuaded by Lombard king Agilulf to approach the pope Boniface IV regarding the schism and its theological controversies, urging him to summon a council and prove his orthodoxy.

In time, Lombards started to renounce Arianism, and the bishops of Old Aquileia formally ended the schism with Rome at the Synod of Pavia in 698. After old Aquileia reconciled with Rome, Pope Gregory II granted the pallium to Patriarch Serenus (715-730) of Aquileia in 723. In 774, the Lombard Kingdom, including old Aquileia, fell under the Frankish rule. In 788-790, Byzantine Istria also fell in Frankish hands, while Grado remained under Byzantine rule, and thus a base was created for disputes over metropolitan jurisdiction in Istria. In 812, the Franco-Byzantine Treaty of Aachen was concluded, leaving Grado with Venice and coastal Dalmatia in Byzantine, and Istria in Frankish hands.

In 803 and 811, delimitation of metropolitan jurisdictions between old Aquileia and Salzburg was resolved, by establishing the border on river Drava, thus leaving Carniola and southern parts of Carantania and Pannonia in Aquileian jurisdiction.

In 1077, patriarch of Old Aquileia was granted temporal powers in much of Friuli, and also acquired such powers over some other regions, including parts of Istria, thus creating the Patriarchal State of Aquileia, that existed until the first half of the 15th century, when it was annexed by the Venetian Republic. In spite of losing temporal powers, the Patriarchate of Old Aquileia continued to exist as an ecclesiastical institution until 1751, when it was finally abolished.

The Patriarch of Old Aquileia became simply the Patriarch of Aquileia, although the title was also claimed by the Patriarch of New Aquileia (Grado), who was now more commonly known as simply the Patriarch of Grado.

== Holders of the office ==
Holders of the office who were recorded are:

- Ioannes I 606
- Marcianus 623-628
- Fortunatus 628-663
- Felix of Aquileia|Felix 649-?
- Ioannes II 663-?
- Agathon 679-680 or 679-?
- Ioannes III 680-?

== See also ==
- Patriarchate of Aquileia
- Patriarchal State of Aquileia
- Patriarchate of New Aquileia
- Aquileian rite
- List of bishops and patriarchs of Aquileia
- Titular Archbishop of Aquileia

== Bibliography ==
- Dursteler, Eric, ed. (2013). A Companion to Venetian History, 1400-1797. Leiden-Boston: Brill.
- Luthar, Oto, ed. (2008). The Land Between: A History of Slovenia. Frankfurt am Main: Peter Lang.
- Meyendorff, John (1989). Imperial unity and Christian divisions: The Church 450-680 A.D. Crestwood, NY: St. Vladimir's Seminary Press.
- Price, Richard M. (2007). "The Three Chapters Controversy and the Council of Chalcedon". The Crisis of the Oikoumene: The Three Chapters and the Failed Quest for Unity in the Sixth-century Mediterranean. Turnhout: Brepols. pp. 17–37.
- Schmidt, Ondřej (2019). John of Moravia between the Czech Lands and the Patriarchate of Aquileia (ca. 1345–1394). Leiden-Boston: Brill.
- Sotinel, Claire (2007). "The Three Chapters and the Transformations of Italy". The Crisis of the Oikoumene: The Three Chapters and the Failed Quest for Unity in the Sixth-century Mediterranean. Turnhout: Brepols. pp. 85–120.
- Štih, Peter (2010). The Middle Ages between the Eastern Alps and the Northern Adriatic: Select Papers on Slovene Historiography and Medieval History. Leiden-Boston: Brill.
- Wickham, Chris (1981). Early Medieval Italy: Central Power and Local Society, 400-1000. Totowa, NJ: Barnes & Noble.
