= Francesco Barbaro (patriarch of Aquileia) =

Venetian diplomat and Italian Catholic bishop

- Patriarch of Aquileia
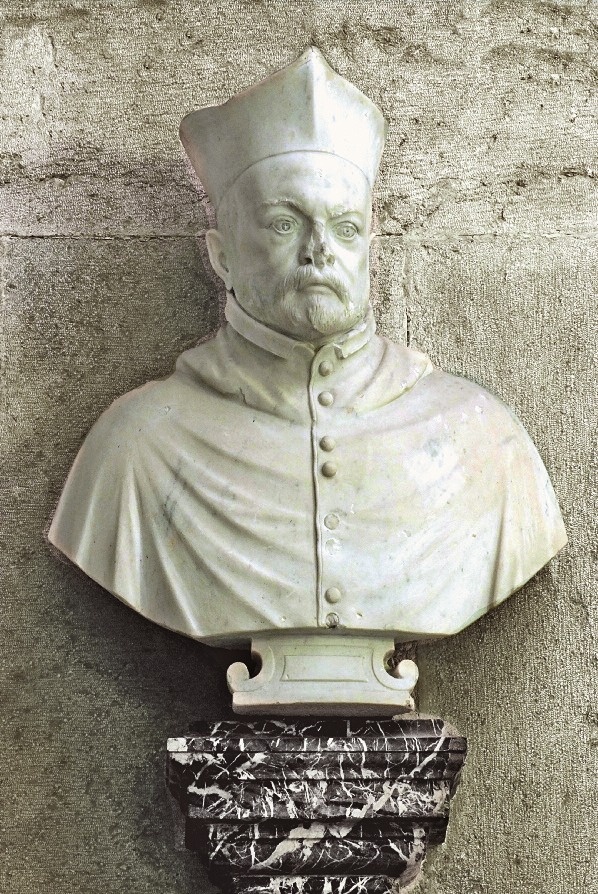
- Church: Catholic Church
- See: Patriarchate of Aquileia
- Appointed: 3 October 1593
- Term ended: 27 April 1616

Personal details
- Born: 16 March 1546 Venezia
- Died: 27 April 1616 (aged 70) Venezia

Francesco Barbaro (1546–1616) was a Venetian aristocrat, ambassador and, from 1593 to his death, Patriarch of Aquileia.

== Life ==
Francesco Barbaro was born on 16 March 1546 in Venice. He was the great-grandson of Francesco Barbaro and son of Marcantonio Barbaro. From 1578 to 1581 he was ambassador at the court of the Duchy of Savoy. He served as Ambassador to Florence in 1585.

When the Patriarch of Aquileia, Giovanni Grimani, asked Pope Sixtus V for an assistant, the Pope chose Francisco Barbaro for his experience in politics and diplomacy. On 7 October 1585, Barbaro was appointed titular Archbishop of Tyre with the right of succession as Patriarch of Aquileia. On 3 October 1593, Grimani died and Francesco Barbaro was replaced him as Patriarch of Aquileia.

In 1595 Barbaro opened the diocesan synod in the Castello di San Daniele. This synod was marked by conflict between the canons of Udine and Cividale over which of two locations was the most important. Barbaro decided that precedent supported Udine; the clerics of Cividale protested.

In the same year Francesco asked Pope Clement VIII to appoint his younger brother Ermolao Barbaro as his coadjutor. On February 12, 1596 the Pope appointed Ermolao Barbaro as archbishop of Tyre.

Francesco supported the Roman Rite of Pius V over the older Aquileian Rite. He persuaded Udine to adopt the Roman Rite at the provincial synod held on October 19–27, 1596. Barbaro did the same on 11 May 1600 at the provincial synod of Cividale and on 23 June 1602 with that of Gorizia.

Patriarch Francesco had a new Patriarchal Palace built in Udine and a new seminary for clerics. Until that time the residence of the patriarchs had been on top of the hill, but as the Republic of Venice wanted to build a fortress there. Statues of the previous Patriarchs were set up in the new building and Barbaro donated his personal library.

He died in Venezia on 27 April 1616. He was buried in the church of Sant'Antonio Abate di Udine, along with his brother who succeeded him to lead the Patriarchate under the name of Ermolao Barbaro II.
