= Albert Pessler =

17th c. provost of Patriarchate of Aquileia

- Born: 1590; Gorizia
- Died: 1629 (aged 38–39)
- Other names: Albert Pesler von Rudolfswert
- Occupation: Catholic priest

Albert Pessler (Italian: Alberto Pesler; German: Albrecht Pessler) (1590–1629) was 17th-century provost of Patriarchate of Aquileia.

== Family ==
Pessler was born in noble family in Gorizia in 1590. His father was Andrej and his mother was Julija de Bertis. Pessler's uncle was Ursin de Bertis, archbishop of the Roman Catholic Diocese of Trieste. Pessler matriculated on 6 June 1603 at the University of Graz, run by the Jesuits.

== Career ==
Pessler began his career as a Catholic priest and being supported by his uncle, quickly advanced to the position of main vicar in Roman Catholic Diocese of Trieste. In 1622, after death of Marko Khun a provost of Rudolfwert, Habsburg Empire (modern day Novo Mesto in Slovenia), Pessler was appointed to position of provost in Rudolfwert. On 10 June 1623 Ferdinand II, Holy Roman Emperor sent Pessler accompanied with emperor's envoy count Paolo Savelli to deliver emperor's secret letter to Vatican to request establishment of Bishopric of Gorizia and to request separation of the Austrian diocese from the Patriarchate of Aquileia. Pessler has been engaged for this mission as emperor's secret ambassador.

On 1 November 1625 Pessler wrote a report about Orthodox Serbs who immigrated to territory under jurisdiction of Patriarchate of Aquileia and Roman Catholic diocese of Zagreb. In this report Pessler proposed to convert Orthodox Serbs to Eastern Catholicism and to expel Orthodox priests and replace them with Roman Catholic priests. In 1627 Pessler sent reports about local Orthodox Christians to Congregatio de propaganda fide.
