= Synod of Grado =

The Synod of Grado was a Synod held in 579 by bishops loyal to the Patriarch of Aquileia. It was held in Grado as the Patriarch had fled there after the Lombard invasion of Northern Italy. The Synod helped to prolong the schism of the Three Chapters.

It is also known in some sources as one of the Councils of Aquileia.
