= Gotebald =

Gotebald (or Gotebold) was the Patriarch of Aquileia during the middle of the eleventh century (1049–1063). He was originally a provost from Speyer (prepositus Nemetensis). During his reign, the century-old conflict between Old-Aquileia and Grado reached a climax.

Between 1050 and 1051, he supported the bishop of Treviso in a conflict, going so far as to falsify an imperial diploma.

In 1053, Pope Leo IX declared Grado to be the true patriarchate, a Nova Aquileia and caput et metropolis of the Province of Venetia et Histria. Gotebald was relegated to being mere Forojuliensis episcopus. In response to this, Gotebald took up arms to defend the territorial integrity of his patriarchal diocese. He refused to aid the papal reformers against simoniacs. He did, however, have the friendship of Henry III, Holy Roman Emperor, who even confirmed the false diploma. Gotebald and the emperor put pressure on Pope Victor II to reverse the decision of Leo, but to no avail.

Henry continued to treat Gotebald with prestige nevertheless. On his deathbed (1056), the emperor called on Gotebald, Gebhard III of Regensburg, and the pope to determine the regency for his young son Henry IV. Gotebald traveled to Germany in the years that followed and was confirmed as patriarch with supremacy over Grado by Henry IV.

Despite his lifelong conflict with the see of Grado and the popes, he was not a poor clergyman. He enlarged the monasteries of his domain considerably before his death in 1063.

== Sources ==
- Caravale, Mario (ed). Dizionario Biografico degli Italiani. Rome.

Preceded by Eberhard	Patriarch of Aquileia; 1049–1063	Succeeded by Ravengerius
