= Council of Pavia =

Council of Pavia or Synod of Pavia may refer to:

- Council of Pavia (698), ended the schism of the Three Chapters in northern Italy
- Council of Pavia (850), prohibited bishops from hunting
- Council of Pavia (962), attended by Otto the Great
- Council of Pavia (997), dealt with the illegal transfer of archbishop of Mainz and the bigamous marriage of Robert II of France
- Council of Pavia (998), held by the Emperor Otto III
- Council of Pavia (1018), dealt with church reform
- Council of Pavia (1022), dealt with church reform
- Council of Pavia (1046), held by the Henry III of Germany on his way to be crowned emperor
- Council of Pavia (1160), convened by Frederick Barbarossa to end a papal schism
- Council of Siena (1423–1424), which was convened at Pavia before an outbreak of plague forced it to relocate to Siena
