= Maxentius of Aquileia =

Maxentius of Aquileia (Note: Italian: Massenzio di Aquileia.) (d. 830s) was the patriarch of Aquileia from 811 until his death in 837.

== Biography ==
Not much is known about Maxentius's date of birth, or his early life. His rise to prominence as the patriarch of Aquileia was not until the death of his predecessor Ursus which occurred in the early months of the 811s. Records show that he quickly picked up where Ursus had left off, soliciting in Charlemagne's court (810/811s) for funds in order to rebuild Aquileia.

=== Background: the schism of the Three Chapters ===
Maxentius's success in being elected to the office of Patriarch of Aquileia occurred after the period known as the schism of the Three Chapters. The schism of the Three Chapters had roots early in 551. However, the dispute did not pose a threat until it became a significant issue in the eyes Lombard Church at beginning of the 554s. Some argue that the schism of the Three Chapters was essential a schism, a division caused by strong opposition towards beliefs or theological orthodoxy between two parties. Around 551 there was initial proclamation by Justinian I that condemned certain parts of theocratic works and beliefs of the Chalcedonian Orthodox in the capital of Constantinople. In response, the Chalcedonian Orthodox doctrine issued their own interpretation of the relationship between the divinity and human nature of Jesus Christ. The Chalcedonian Orthodox argued that Jesus has two natures, one human and one divine and that these two natures subsisted together. Justinian I's condemnation on specific issues of the council of the Chalcedonian Orthodoxy was received badly in the West. In Rome, the papacy eventually fell to Justinian I's decision on the condemnation of the Chalcedonian Orthodoxy. This in turn led to the Northern Italian churches of Aquileia and Milan excommunicating the papacy for its decision to support Justinian I. The conflict between the Northern Italian church and Justinian I's position, and the papacy manifested itself in a debate that would unexpectedly threaten the unity of Christianity.

In particular, the schism of the Three Chapters resulted in the Church of Aquileia splitting in two. There was the "new" Aquileian church in Grado, which was pro-Roman, and there was the "old" Aquileian church which retained its loyalty to the Chalcedonian Orthodox and wished to be under the protection of the Lombard king. The reshuffling of allegiance led to a "degree of cultural separation from Rome."

=== Aftermath and appointment as patriarch ===
The conflict caused by the schism of the Three Chapters lasted long enough that by the eighth century the dispute had become buried underneath diluted political and theological debate that even Paul the Deacon himself, had little knowledge of what or why or even where the debate was headed. The conflict led to old Aquileia to be viewed less favorably by the Church of Rome and by some extent the imperial capital of Byzantium.

It was not until 698, pressure from Pope Sergius I, and no doubt the papacy's geopolitical location of Grado led to the shift of Aquileia to readopt the Roman papacy's orthodox. However, this further led to another conflict to arise whereas Aquileia and Grado, while now technically in communion belonged to two separate kingdoms, with Aquileia still being the center of Lombard rule in the North, and Grado, the vision of the Byzantium's imperial rule.

In 811, after the death of Ursus, the patriarch of Aquileia, Maxentius was appointed the title of Patriarch of Aquileia. With this title, he was able to lead the church of Aquileia to great prominence. Maxentius's dedication to the church was followed by political, social development with minor urban growth. Maxentius dedication to his new title thus allowed Aquileia to move from the ‘rebel’ status that it once had into more favorable view and started to gain support from the imperial capital and rising momentum of benefits from the Emperor himself.

=== Aquileia under Maxentius ===
Maxentius's development of Aquileia gained the attention of the Byzantine Empire, especially in the 9th century. So much to say it was the vastly gaining the preference as the papacy's preferred city in the West. Maxentius implemented ecclesiastical doctrine and legislature that allowed for a surge in economic recovery leading to further theological growth and instilling heavier political establishment of the imperial will. Aquileia had not seen such a growth in its economy or favor from the Byzantium empire since Maxentius had been appointed the title of Patriarch.

Maxentius soon became a favorite of Charlemagne, and they frequently exchanged letters. In these letters, Charlemagne expressed his wishes for the continuing growth of theological prominence in Aquileia. The letters covered areas such as baptismal rites and the ceremony of communion and how they should be conducted. Charlemagne's hoped that Maxentius would closely follow these rituals which were also followed by the imperial capital and set down by the papacy. By agreeing and enforcing the will of Charlemagne and his advisors, Maxentius helped Aquileia to gain territories and gifts from the diocese. Aquileia's prominence was continually favored by Charlemagne's successors and soon led to Aquileia being one of the largest dioceses in Northern Italy having the full support of the Carolingians.

In 826, Maxentius was unable to stand the city of Grado. This was due to Maxentius only seeing Grado as a retreat for the patriarchs of Aquileia and he felt that Grado had no claims to Istria or its existence as a legitimate metropolitan city. Maxentius, aware that he would have the backing from the Emperors in the West, went on the mission for Grado to concede to the city of Aquileia. Maxentius, with the added pressure from the Carolingian Emperor, demanded the patriarchal title of the bishop of Grado to be removed and Grado be subjugated to the diocese of Aquileia. The success of these demands demonstrated the power and favor which Maxentius was able to single-handedly build with the Carolingians. With Grado now under the control of the diocese of Aquileia, Maxentius had built an influential and powerful diocese that had vast territories and the full backing of the Carolingian Emperor, Louis the Pious.

After Grado was subjected to the diocese of Aquileia, Maxentius began the reconstruction of the patriarchal basilica. Some suggest that the construction of the basilica would have only been possible under Maxentius reign as patriarch of Aquileia. Aquileia was now able to fund the construction of monuments with the financial backing of the Caroligians. The basilica was an extravagant piece of work in the East and had significant influence from the Byzantine backing in the West. The floors were beautifully decorated with a “mixed system of mosaic and marble slabs and the decorations of the steps of the episcopal are attributable to Maxentius.” The eastern side of the basilica was built in a semicircular apse to which Maxentius added two side chapels. On the west side, Maxentius built an atrium to the basilica and baptistery. Maxentius further ordered for the excavation so that a crypt could be built underneath which may hold the relics of Saint Hermagoras and his deacon Fortunatus.

=== Death and legacy ===
While sources are unclear of how Maxentius died, the sources suggest that Maxentius died around the 830s-40s. Maxentius ability to raise Aquileia from the ashes of its destruction by Attila into becoming one of the Carolingians Empire's most treasured cities in the West illustrates his ability to combine politics and theology to achieve greatness. However, due to his dealings with Grado, many of Maxentius opponents criticized his actions as “poisonous.”
