= Carmen de synodo ticinensi =

Medieval Latin poem

The Carmen de synodo ticinensi ("Song of the Synod of Ticinum") is a poem of nineteen stanzas of five lines each in iambic trimeter. Shortly after the Synod of Pavia (Ticinum) in 698, the Carmen was written down in a cursive hand on some blank pages in a copy of the acts of the Council of Chalcedon. The same hand also added it to another manuscript. It records that the assembled churchmen made heavy use of ancient texts, perhaps including the manuscript in which it was later written. It is the principal contemporary source of the synod, which brought to an end the Schism of the Three Chapters in Italy.

The poem is attributed to Stefanus m., either a teacher (magister) or monk (monachus), writing at the behest of King Cunincpert, who called the council and who is praised in the poem for re-building Modena. He also credits King Aripert I with abolishing the "heresy of the Arians".
