= Gebhard III =

Gebhard III may refer to:

- Gebhard III (bishop of Constance) (ca. 1040 – 12 November 1110), Bishop of Constance
- Gebhard III (bishop of Regensburg), bishop of Regensburg (or Ratisbon) from 1036 to 2 December 1060
