= Sveti Mohor, Moravče =

Sveti Mohor
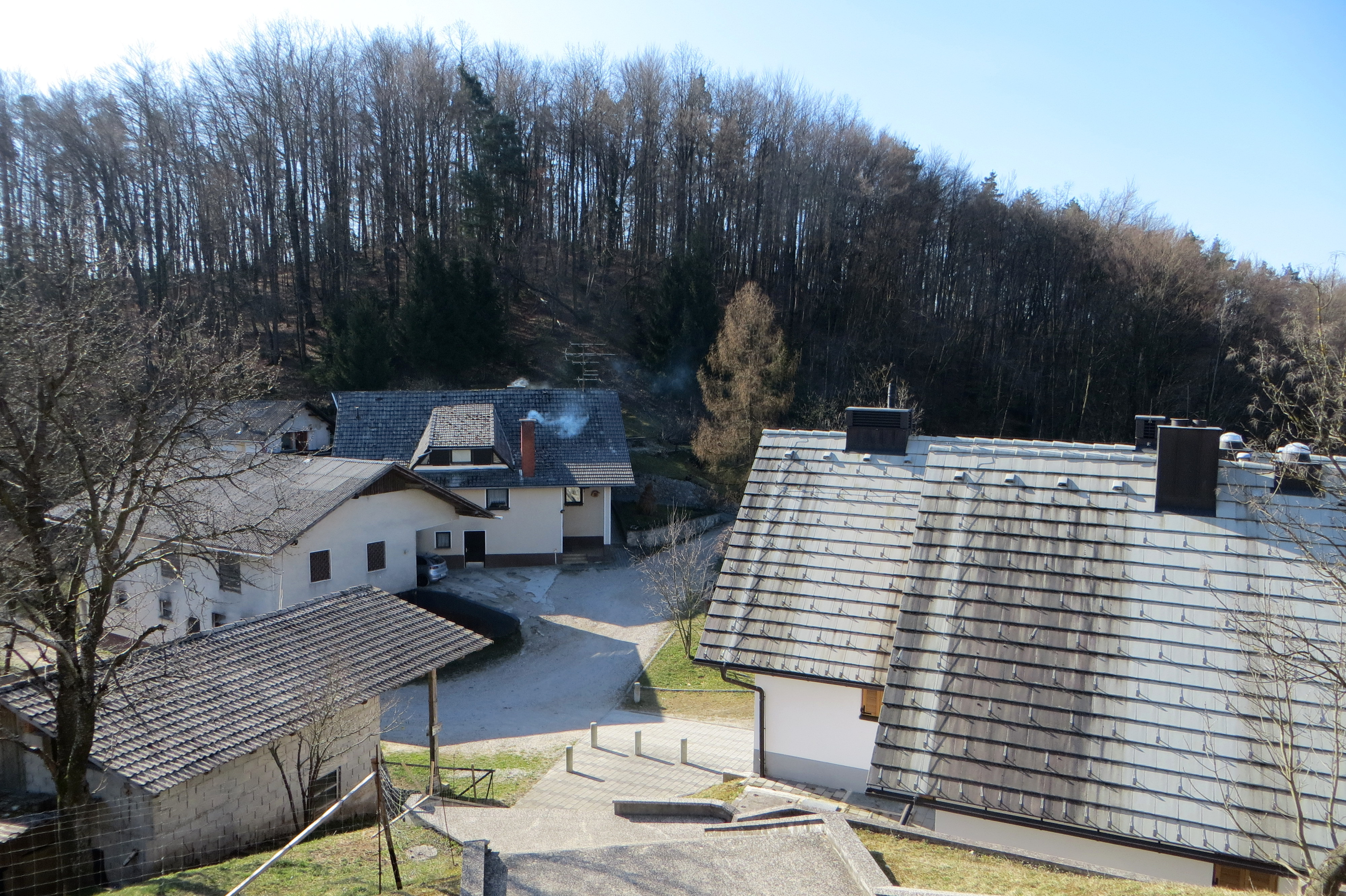

- Location in Slovenia
- Coordinates: 46°9′6″N 14°43′59″E
- Country: Slovenia
- Traditional region: Upper Carniola
- Statistical region: Central Slovenia
- Municipality: Moravče
- Elevation: 500 m (1,600 ft)

Sveti Mohor (Slovene pronunciation: [ˈsʋeːti ˈmɔːxɔɾ], German: Sankt Hermagor) is a former settlement in the Municipality of Moravče in central Slovenia. It is now part of the village of Podstran. The area is part of the traditional region of Upper Carniola. The municipality is now included in the Central Slovenia Statistical Region.

== Geography ==
Sveti Mohor lies in the northern part of the village of Podstran, at the top of the hill and next to the church that bear the same name.

== History ==
Sveti Mohor had a population of nine living in two houses in 1900. Sveti Mohor was annexed by Podstran in 1953, ending its existence as an independent settlement.

== Church ==
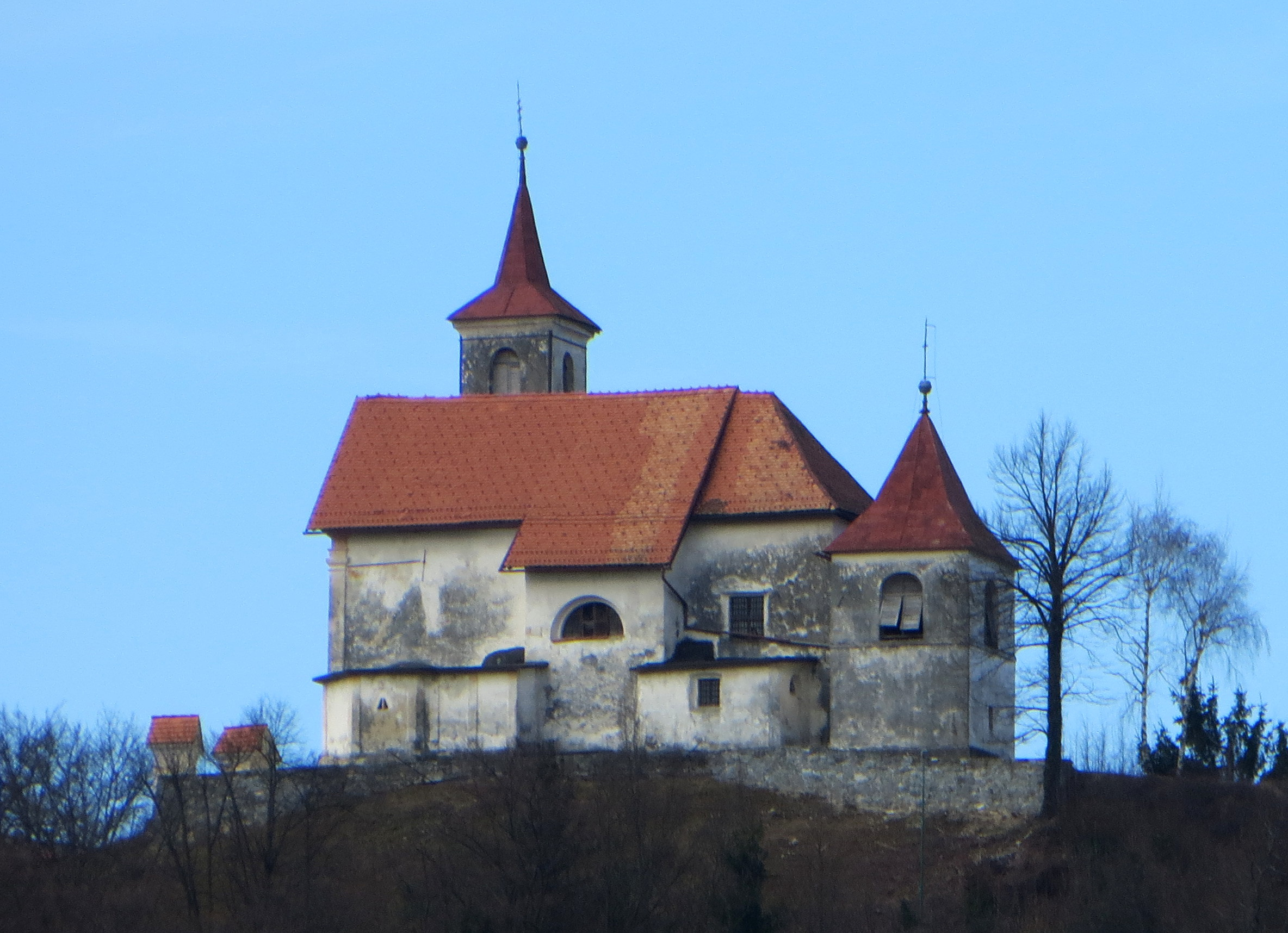
Saints Hermagoras and Fortunatus Church

The church in Sveti Mohor, built on the hill immediately above the hamlet, is dedicated to Saints Hermagoras and Fortunatus and belongs to the Parish of Moravče. It dates to the 15th and early 18th centuries.
