= Podstran =

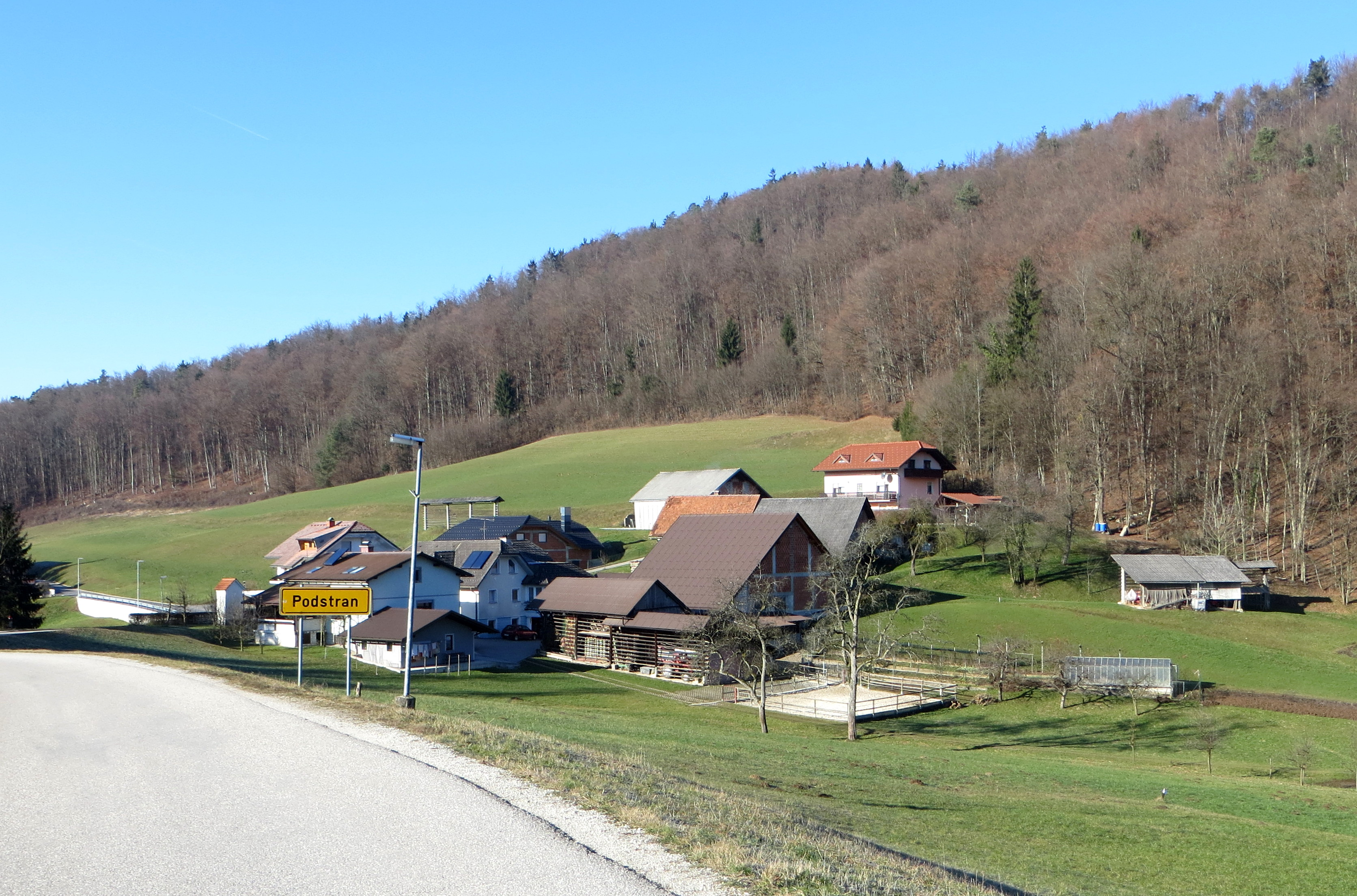

- Location in Slovenia
- Coordinates: 46°8′39.38″N 14°43′46.52″E
- Country: Slovenia
- Traditional region: Upper Carniola
- Statistical region: Central Slovenia
- Municipality: Moravče

Area
  - Total: 0.82 km^{2} (0.32 sq mi)
- Elevation: 393.8 m (1,292 ft)

Population (2002)
  - Total: 45
- Postal code: 1226

Podstran (pronounced [ˈpoːtstɾan]) is a settlement north of Moravče in central Slovenia. The area is part of the traditional region of Upper Carniola. It is now included with the rest of the Municipality of Moravče in the Central Slovenia Statistical Region. It includes the hamlet of Sveti Mohor (German: Sankt Hermagor).

== Name ==
Podstran was attested in historical sources as Seydendorf in 1386 and Salog in 1496, among other variants.

== History ==
The hamlet of Sveti Mohor, where the village church dedicated to Saints Hermagoras and Fortunatus stands, was annexed by Podstran in 1953.
