= Paulinus I =

Paulinus I may refer to:

- Paulinus I of Antioch
- Paulinus I of Aquileia
