= Hilarius of Aquileia =

Bishop of Aquileia, martyr and saint

Saint Hilarius of Aquileia

Bishop and martyr
- Died: ~284 AD
- Venerated in: Roman Catholic Church
- Feast: 16 march

Hilarius of Aquileia, also Hilary of Aquileia (Italian: Ilario d'Aquileia, also Ellaro or Elaro) (d. 16 March, c. 284) was an early Bishop of Aquileia, a martyr and saint.

He is supposed to have been the second bishop of Aquileia, succeeding Hermagoras. During the persecution of Numerian he was tortured to death under the prefect Beronius. Before his death Hilarius's prayers brought about the collapse of the pagan temples in Aquileia and the images of the gods they contained, to which he had refused to sacrifice.

His martyrdom was shared by his deacon Tatianus, otherwise Tatian, with whom Hilarius's name is often linked, as in the dedication of Gorizia Cathedral, and also by their companions Felix, Largus and Dionysius.

The feast day of Hilarius and companions is 16 March, the date of their martyrdom.
