= Nicetas (bishop of Aquileia) =

Saint Nicetas
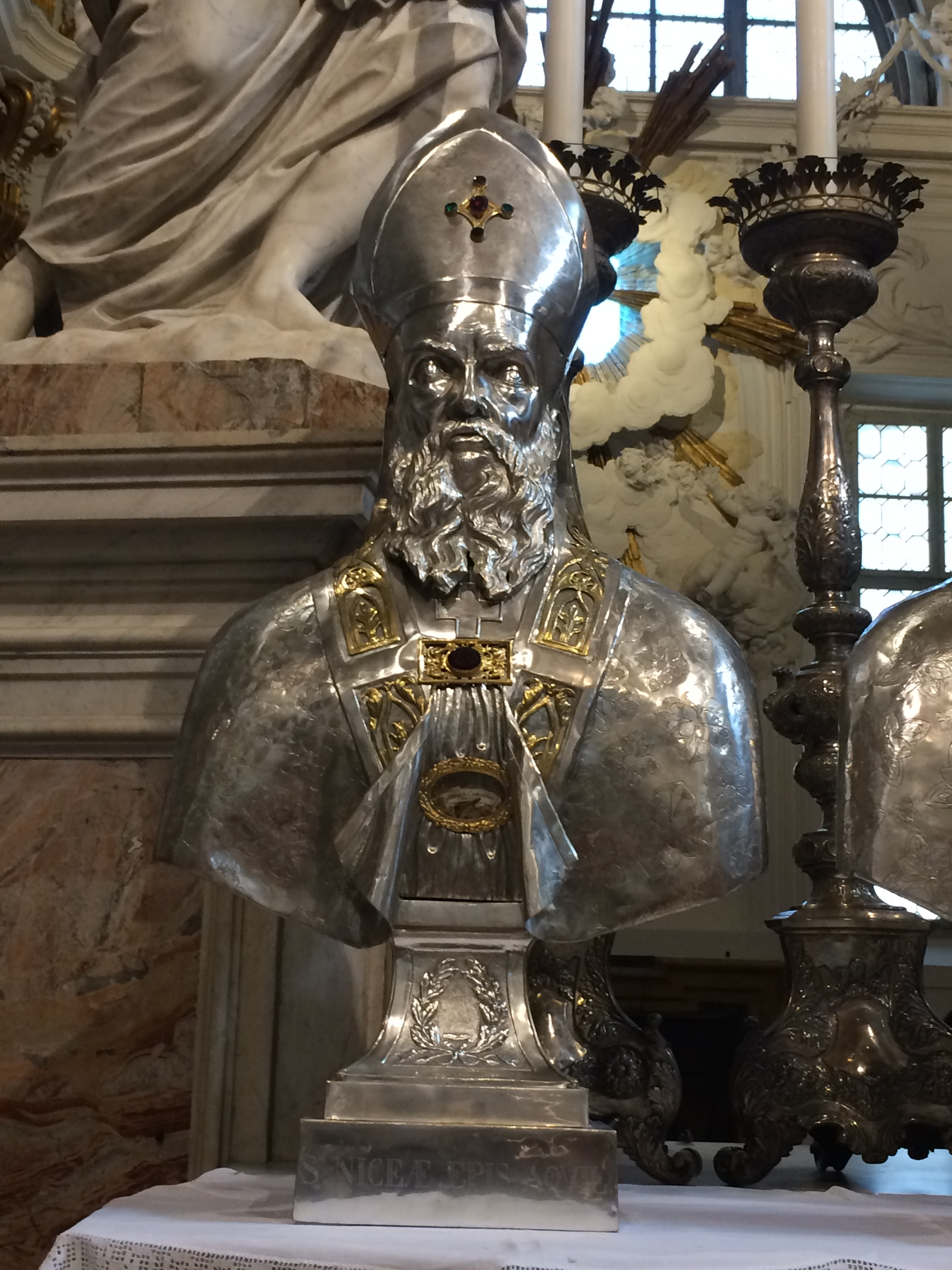
- Born: 5th Century
- Died: 485; Aquileia
- Venerated in: Roman Catholicism
- Feast: June 22

Nicetas was the archbishop of Aquileia from 454 to 485. In the past, his life and deeds were conflated with Nicetas of Remesiana.

In 452, he temporarily moved from Aquileia to the island of Grado, as the island was safer from attacks by groups moving west from the Eurasian Steppe into the former lands of the Roman Empire.

Saint Nicetas's feast day is observed on June 22.
