= Epiphanius (patriarch of Aquileia) =

Italian patriarch of Aquileia

Epiphanius (served 612–613) was the first Patriarch of Aquileia to rule from Grado.
