= Marcello Costalunga =

Roman Catholic archbishop (1925–2010)

- Born: January 5, 1925; Rome, Italy
- Died: May 5, 2010 (aged 85)
- Occupations: Roman Catholic archbishop, official of the Roman Curia
- Known for: Service in the Roman Curia
- Title: Titular Archbishop of Aquileia

Marcello Costalunga (5 January 1925 – 5 May 2010) was the Roman Catholic Titular Archbishop of Aquileia and an official of the Roman Curia.

Born in Rome, he was ordained a priest on 27 March 1948 by Luigi Cardinal Traglia who at the time was an auxiliary bishop of Rome.

Costalunga was appointed both as an official of the Roman Curia and a titular archbishop on 10 December 1990. His consecration as bishop by Pope John Paul II took place on 6 January 1991. Giovanni Battista Cardinal Re and Justin Francis Cardinal Rigali were co-consecrators.

Archbishop Costalunga retired from the curial position on 25 January 2001, however, keeping the title of his titular see.

== Notes ==
Catholic Church titles
Preceded by Michele Cecchini	Titular Archbishop of Aquileia; 10 December 1990 – 5 May 2010	Succeeded by Charles John Brown
