= Titular Archbishop of Aquileia =

Position in the Roman Catholic Church

Titular see of Aquileia

Location
- Country: Italy

Information
- Denomination: Roman Catholic
- Rite: Latin Rite
- Established: 1968

Current leadership
- Pope: Francis
- Titular Archbishop: Charles John Brown

The Titular Archbishop of Aquileia is the head of a titular see of the Roman Catholic church. The title is currently held by Charles John Brown, the Apostolic Nuncio to Philippines.

== History ==
The titular see is one of the last vestiges of the once powerful Patriarchate of Aquileia. It was suppressed in the eighteenth century. In 1968 Aquileia became a titular non-residential archbishopric. Among the more recent holders were:

- Joseph Cardinal Höffner (6 January 1969 – 24 February 1969)
- Michele Cecchini (26 Feb 1969 – 26 April 1989)
- Marcello Costalunga (10 December 1990 – 5 May 2010)
- Charles John Brown (26 November 2011 – present)

The office of Patriarch of Aquileia had become contentious with both the Republic of Venice and the Habsburg Empire contesting the right to nominate the Archbishop because both Venetian and Austrian Dioceses were subject to the Patriarchate.

In 1751 with the 6 July bull Injunctio Nobis, Pope Benedict XIV divided the patriarchate into two archdioceses; one at Udine, with Venetian Friuli for its territory, the other at Gorizia, with jurisdiction over Austrian Friuli. Of the ancient patriarchate there remained but the parish church of Aquileia. It was made immediately subject to the Apostolic See and to its rector was granted the right of using episcopal insignia seven times in the year.
