= Councils of Aquileia =

In the history of Christianity and later of the Roman Catholic Church, there have been several Councils of Aquileia. The Roman city of Aquileia at the head of the Adriatic Sea is the seat of an ancient episcopal see, seat of the Patriarch of Aquileia.

== Council of 381 AD ==
The council was summoned by the Western Roman Emperor Gratian to address the Arian controversy. It was organized by Ambrose, and presided over by Valerian, Bishop of Aquileia. Thirty-two Western bishops attended.

The Arian Palladius of Ratiaria and Secundianus of Singidunum, were defenders of the Arian position. The Arian position was anathematized by all the bishops other than Palladius, who disputed the legitimacy of the council due to the absence of Eastern bishops.

The council also asked the two Emperors to convene a general council of both East and West in order to put an end to the Meletian schism in Antioch.

== Council of 553 AD ==
The council of 553 inaugurated the Schism of the Three Chapters, that for a century and more separated many churches of northern Italy from the Holy See; in it the Bishops of Venetia, Istria, and Liguria refused to accept the decrees of the Second Council of Constantinople (the 5th General Council, 553 AD), on the plea that by the condemnation of the Three Chapters it had undone the work of the Council of Chalcedon of 451. In Northern Italy the ecclesiastical provinces of Milan and Aquileia broke off communion with the papacy; the former yielding only towards the end of the 6th century, whereas Aquileia protracted its resistance to about 700.

== Council of 579 AD ==
The council of 579, also known as the Synod of Grado, was a meeting of bishops loyal to Aquileia that helped to prolong the schism of the Three Chapters.

The Council met on 3 November in Grado, under the presidency of Elias, Patriarch of Aquileia, and with the presence of the Papal Legate, the priest Laurentius, and seventeen bishops, and two priests representing absent bishops. A letter of Pope Paschal I, dated April 20, was read out, in which permission was granted to move the Seat of the Patriarchate from Aquileia to Grado, while retaining the title of Patriarch of Aquileia. The Council approved the Pope's letter.

== Council of 1184 ==
The Council of 1184 was held on 30 September 1184 at Aquileia by the Patriarch, Gotifredus. The Council denounced, robbers, plunderers of cemeteries, incendiaries, and those guilty of sacrilege, especially by physically attacking clergy. Perpetrators were to be subject to anathema.

== Council of 1409 ==
In 1409 a council was held by Gregory XII against the pretensions of the rival popes, Benedict XIII (Peter de Luna) and Alexander V (Peter of Candia). He declared them schismatical, but promised to renounce the papacy if they would do the same.

Pope Gregory had responded to the call of the cardinals at Livorno in June 1408 for a general council to be held at Pisa with an announcement that he would hold a council himself, somewhere in the territory of Aquileia or the territory of Rimini. Aquileia ceased to be an attractive venue when its Patriarch announced his adherence to the Council of Pisa and sent representatives to Pisa. On 19 December 1408 Pope Gregory fixed the town of Cividale as the site of his council. His council held its inaugural session on 6 June 1409, the day after he had been formally deposed by the Council of Pisa. The attendance was so embarrassingly small that he had to issue new letters of convocation on 20 June 1409, with a date of 22 July for the Second Session. He authorized his friend King Rupert (Ruprecht) to depose any prelate in his domains who refused to obey the summons to his council. He received a severe blow when the Venetians decided to support the Council of Pisa, since Venice controlled both the land and sea routes between Rimini and Cividale.

In that Second Session Gregory XII declared that his little assembly was a general council of the entire Church. He then declared all the popes of the Roman Obedience back to Urban VI to be canonical, and he anathematized all the popes of the Avignon Obedience, and included Alexander V for good measure. Another session was held on 5 September 1409, at which he demanded that Peter of Candia (Alexander V) renounce the position to which he had been elected by an uncanonical conclave.

Trapped in Friuli, Gregory XII had to be rescued by ships which had been sent by Ladislaus of Naples. Disguised as a merchant he fled on 6 September, bringing his council to a sudden end. He made first for Ortona on the Adriatic, and then Gaeta in central Italy. His chamberlain, who was playing the part of the pope in order to distract his pursuers, was captured by the soldiers of the Patriarch of Aquileia.

== Council of 1596 ==
In October 1596 Francesco Barbaro, Patriarch of Aquileia, held a council at the city of Udine in Friuli, at which he renewed in nineteen decrees the legislation of the Council of Trent, including the replacement of the Aquileian Rite with the Tridentine Mass. This was part of a series of synods around the Patriarchate to standardise the Rite with Rome.

== Bibliography ==
- Hefele, Karl Joseph (1876). A History of the Christian Councils. Vol. II: A.D. 326-A.D. 429. Edinburgh: T. & T. Clark. ISBN 9780524005569.
- Hefele, Karl Joseph (1895). A History of the Councils of the Church. Vol. IV: A.D. 451 to A.D. 680. Edinburgh: T. & T. Clark.
- Hefele, Karl Joseph (1896). A History of the cCuncils of the Church. Vol. V: A.D. 626 to close of Second Council of Nicea, 797. Edinburgh: T. & T. Clark.
