= Great Schism =

Great Schism may refer to:

- East–West Schism, between the Eastern Orthodox Church and the Roman Catholic Church, beginning in 1054
- Western Schism, a split within the Catholic Church lasting from 1378 to 1417

== See also ==
- Schism, a division between people, usually belonging to an organization, movement, or religious denomination
- Shia–Sunni relations, their division traces back to a Sunni–Shia schism
