= Gebhard III (bishop of Regensburg) =

Gebhard III, called Gebhard of Franconia or von Hohenlohe, was the bishop of Regensburg (or Ratisbon) from 1036 to 2 December 1060. He succeeded Gebhard II. As the son of Adelaide of Metz, he was an uncle of the Emperor Henry III and an ally of the emperor in Bavaria, where he fell into conflict with the Duke Conrad I. Gebhard came from the Frankish noble family of the Hohenlohe and was a stepbrother of Kaiser Konrad II through his mother (of whom he was a son of her second marriage). It was said that their relationship was neither openly hostile, nor particularly warm.

According to Otloh of Saint Emmeram, between 1036 and the bishop's death in 1060, he and the monks of Saint Emmeram were engaged in a dispute over a number of properties. This dispute featured in a number of Otloh's writings, and in his Liber Visionum [Book of Visions] Otloh went so far as to explain that Gebhard had a place reserved for him in Hell. Otloh's condemnations of the bishops would lead to his some of his brothers at Saint Emmeram denouncing him, leading to Otloh fleeing to the monastery of Fulda in 1062.

It was Gebhard who, as bishop, recommended the young Gebhard be appointed to the vacant see of Eichstädt. This younger Gebhard would later be Pope Victor II. Henry also showed his favour to the Bavarian see with the grant to Gebhard of the abbey of Kempten. During his episcopate likewise were founded the collegiate chapter of Öhringen and the Geisenfeld convent.

When Henry III was on his deathbed in 1056, he appointed Gebhard, Gotebald, and Pope Victor II to determine the regency for his young son Henry IV.

On his death, Gebhard was succeeded by Otto of Ritenberg. He was buried in Öhringen Abbey (founded by him and his mother Adelheid in 1037).
