= Provost (religion) =

Senior official in a number of Christian churches

A provost is a senior official in a number of Christian churches.

== Historical development ==
The word praepositus (Latin for 'set over', from praeponere, 'to place in front') was originally applied to any ecclesiastical ruler or dignitary. It was soon more specifically applied to the immediate subordinate to the abbot of a monastery, or to the superior of a single cell, and it was defined as such in the Rule of St Benedict. The dean (decanus) was a similarly ranked official. Chrodegang of Metz adopted this usage from the Benedictines when he introduced the monastic organization of canon-law colleges, especially cathedral capitular colleges. The provostship (praepositura) was normally held by the archdeacon, while the office of dean was held by the archpriest. In many colleges, the temporal duties of the archdeacons made it impossible for them to fulfil those of the provostship, and the headship of the chapter thus fell to the dean.

The title became prevost in Old French, before being adopted as provost in English. Prévôt is the equivalent in modern French.

== Denmark, Iceland, Norway, and Sweden ==
In the Nordic countries, a provost (Danish and older Norwegian provst, modern Norwegian prost, Swedish prost (under the current system kontraktsprost), Icelandic prófastur (from the Old English prōfast), Finnish rovasti) is the leader of a provsti (Nor. prosti, Ice. prófastsdæmi, Swe. kontrakt), an administrative territorial unit within the Lutheran national churches which comprises several parishes (sogn, Ice. sókn, Swe. församling (previously socken)), comparable to a Catholic deanery. The provost is the immediate superior of the parish priest (Da. sognepræst, Nor. sogneprest, Ice. sóknarprestur, Swe. församlingspräst) but is normally also a parish priest in one of the local parishes. Several provstier form a diocese (stift (all languages) or bispedømme, Ice. biskupsdæmi, Swe. biskopsdöme).

Until the 19th century the parishes were not only religious districts, but also the core territorial units in the state administration, and the modern municipalities were based upon them; in the same way that the parish priest was normally the foremost government official in most parishes (corresponding to the modern municipalities), the provost was not only a regional religious leader, but one of the highest-ranking government officials within a larger region comprising multiple parishes, in many cases arguably the highest-ranking government official alongside the governor. In the church hierarchy in Denmark and Norway the rank of provost was broadly comparable to the secular rank of governor (amtmand), while the higher rank of bishop corresponded to stiftamtmand (governor of a larger region traditionally based on a diocese or stift).

== Germany ==
While the modern spelling is Propst, in an historical context the spelling Probst may also occur. In the neighboring Czech republic, it is spelled probošt. Historically, the title is also found among military chaplains, both Roman Catholic and Protestant (e.g. Feldpropst in Prussia).

The Evangelical Lutheran Church of Northern Germany uses the title Propst for pastors who are the leaders of a church district (Propstei).

== Poland ==
The Polish derivative proboszcz is the official title denoting a head of a parish (a parish priest, rector, parson or pastor), either Catholic, Orthodox, or Lutheran.

== Anglicanism ==
In England, the title of provost in cathedrals was almost completely replaced by that of dean, although sometimes when a bishop nominated himself as dean of his own cathedral, a provost was appointed as his deputy.

In cathedrals which were also parish churches — especially the newly created cathedrals of the 19th and 20th centuries — the senior priest (who was also the parish priest) was known as the provost from 1931 until 2000. Prior to 1931, they were simply either Vicar or Rector; the passage of the Cathedrals Measure 1931 gave them all the additional title of Provost (they remained Rector/Vicar). This title was used by the head priests of Birmingham Cathedral, Blackburn Cathedral, Bradford Cathedral, Chelmsford Cathedral, Coventry Cathedral, Derby Cathedral, Leicester Cathedral, Newcastle Cathedral, Portsmouth Cathedral, St. Edmundsbury Cathedral, Sheffield Cathedral, Southwark Cathedral, Southwell Minster, and Wakefield Cathedral, but all were redesignated deans in 2000 (following the Cathedrals Measure 1999).

In the Scottish Episcopal Church the leading priests of the cathedrals, with the exception of the Cathedral of The Isles on Cumbrae, continue to be called provosts.

The usage is preserved in the title of the heads of some colleges in England formerly administered by the Church.

== Lutheran and Reformed churches ==
After the Protestant Reformation, usually following pre-Reformation traditional usage, and in connexion with certain churches, some Protestant pastors bore the title of provost. In these cases it was merely an honorific rank, without any special place in the church hierarchy. Such usage occurred, for example, in the Evangelical Church of the old-Prussian Union and its successor Evangelical Church in Berlin-Brandenburg.

In certain Landeskirchen within the Evangelical Church in Germany, the title is still used for a pastor officiating as chairperson in a provostry (e.g. in the Lutheran Evangelical Lutheran State Church in Brunswick, Evangelical Lutheran State Church of Mecklenburg and in the united Evangelical Church in Hesse and Nassau, and the Evangelical Church of the Church Province of Saxony). In the above-mentioned Lutheran churches, a provostry is equal to a deanery, and, in the two united churches, it is a unit comprising several deaneries.

Moreover, in the united Evangelical Church of Berlin-Brandenburg-Silesian Upper Lusatia, the provost is the theological leader of the consistory.

== Catholic Church ==
In the Catholic Church, Provost is a title of a prelate. The title is also commonly used by the superiors of communities of canons regular in houses below the rank of an abbey, the house itself titled either a provostry or canonry.

In a society of apostolic life such as an Oratory of St Philip Neri, the provost is the major religious superior of his particular oratory. It is customary among Oratorians to call the provost "THE father" as he is primus inter pares, and a father in the place of the founder, Philip Neri. In some dioceses it may be an honorary title given to senior priests, while in others it may be granted to vicars in charge of coordinating the pastoral care in a portion of territory and with a certain authority over the parish priests who fall under that particular jurisdiction.

In Germany, the heads of certain chapters under the Catholic Church are still known as provosts (German: probst or propst), while propstei or propstei(pfarr)gemeinde is an honorary designation for some important, old Roman Catholic churches in Germany; most honorary titles date back to the 20th century. Parish priests who are provosts have the privilege of wearing a prelate's dress (black-purple) and using a pectoral cross hung by a ribbon.

=== Archdiocese of Milan ===
In the Archdiocese of Milan, the figure of the provost has historically been an important office in the administration of the archdiocese.

The earliest documented testimonies of praepositi date back to the 12th century and refer not only to the city of Milan, but above all to the rest of Lombardy which belonged to the Ambrosian diocese: the provosts were in fact the head of the parishes that constituted the territory of the Duchy of Milan. One of the most important prepositural offices, for example, is that of Lecco, which in the past was a very important strategic position for commercial traffic with northern Europe and for the military defense of the duchy.

The provosts were based in the capopievi of cities and officiated in the main church of the city; as with the rest of the archdiocese, they followed the Ambrosian Rite for the celebration of the liturgy (except in parishes which for historical reasons followed the Aquileian Rite). In some historical periods they were directly appointed by the papal curia.

They also had the right to appoint the canons of their colleges and to assign for the benefit of the rents of land owned by their parish. Moreover, within the territory of their competence, they established vicariates entrusted to other priests which later revolved into rural parishes.

In the case of the provosts without ecclesiastical jurisdiction over a territory, these were mainly located in the city of Milan where they were placed at the head of the oldest or most outstanding basilicas of the city. Since the provost also had the role of prefect of the chapter, the Milan cathedral also had its own provost.

Following a diocesan synod presided over by Cardinal Giovanni Colombo in 1972, the pievi were suppressed, and the title of provost became as an exclusively honorary title preserved within the archdiocese to be granted to distinguished parish priests.

== Monasteries and religious houses ==
The heads of Augustinian monasteries or friaries and Dominican friaries are termed "provost (canons) or prior (friars)" (praepositus vel prior), and those of Cistercian monasteries "provost or warden" (praepositus vel custos). The superiors of the Oratory are also known as provosts, as noted above.

== Religious orders ==
In some religious orders, especially those under the patronage of royalty or nobility, the ecclesial management of the order is placed under the jurisdiction of a provost.
