= List of bishops and patriarchs of Aquileia =

This is a list of bishops and patriarchs of Aquileia in northeastern Italy. For the ecclesiastical history of the diocese, see Patriarchate of Aquileia.

From 553 until 698 the archbishops renounced Papal authority as part of the Schism of the Three Chapters and when they returned to the Roman fold they maintained the title patriarch which was adopted during this schism.

The patriarchs gained the Countship of Friuli and the March of Carniola in 1077 and the March of Istria in 1209. The temporal authority of the patriarchate was lost on 7 July 1420 when its territories were secularized by Venice.

The Patriarchate was dissolved in 1751 and its ecclesiastical authority divided between the Archbishop of Gorizia (Görz) and the Archbishop of Udine.

== Bishops of Aquileia, c. 50–355 ==
- Saint Mark - founder of community
- Hermagoras (c. 50–70), Protoepiscopus (first bishop)
- ...
- Hilarius of Aquileia or of Panonia c. 276–285, beheaded in the persecutions of Numerian
- Chrysogonus I c. 286–295
- Chrysogonus II c. 295–308
- Theodore c. 308–319
- Agapitus c. 319–332
- Benedictus c. 332–?
- Viator c. 339-340
- Fortunatianus c. 343–355

== Archbishops of Aquileia, 355–557 ==
- Valerianus 369–388
- Chromatius 388–407
- Augustinus 407–434
- Adelphus 434–442
- Maximus I 442–444
- Januarius 444–447
- Secundus 451–452
- Nicetas 454–485
- Marcellianus 485–500
- Marcellinus 500–513/21?
- Stephen I 515/521?–534
- Laurentius, 534-539

== Patriarchs of Aquileia, 539–606 ==
- Macedonius 539–556
- Paulinus I 557–569
- Probinus 569–570
- Elia 571–586
- Severus 586–606

== Schism, 607–698 ==
=== Patriarchs of Old Aquileia ===
- John I 606
- Marcianus 623–628
- Fortunatus 628–663, moved episcopal residence to Cormons
- Felix 649–?
- John II 663–?
- Agathon 679–680 or 679–?
- John III 680–?

=== Patriarchs of Grado ===
- Candidianus 606–612
- Epiphanius 612–613
- Ciprianus 613–627
- Primogenius 630–648
- Maximus II 649
- Stephen II 670–?
- Christophoros 685–?

== Patriarchs of Aquileia ==
- Petrus I 698–700, at the Council of Pavia (698) restored Communion with the Pope
- Serenus 711–723
- Calixtus 726–734, moved episcopal residence to Cividale
  - vacant or unknown 734–772
- Siguald 772–776
- Paulinus II 776–802
- Ursus I 802–811
- Maxentius 811–833
- Andreas 834–844
- Venantius 850–?
- Theutmar 855–?
- Lupus I 855–?
- Valpert 875–899
- Frederick I 901–922
- Leo 922–927
- Ursus II 928–931
- Lupus II 932–944
- Engelfred 944–963
- Rodoald 963–984
- John IV of Ravenna 984–1017
- Poppo 1019–1042, also known as Wolfgang
- Eberhard 1045–1049
- Gotebald 1049–1063
- Ravengerius 1063–1068
- Sigehard 1068–1077
- Henry 1077–1084
- Svatobor (Friedrich) of Bohemia 1084–1085
- Frederick II of Bohemia 1085–1086
- Ulrich I of Eppenstein 1086–1121
- Gerard I 1122–1128
- Pellegrino I of Ortenbourg 1130–1161
- Ulrich II of Treven 1161–1181
- Godfrey 1182–1194
- Pellegrino II of Ortenburg-Sponheim 1195–1204
- Wolfgar of Leibrechtskirchen 1204–1218
- Berthold of Merania 1218–1251, moved episcopal see to Udine
- Gregorio of Montelongo 1251–1269
- Philip of Spanheim 1269–1273
- Raimondo della Torre 1273–1299
- Pietro Gerra 1299–1301
- Ottobuono di Razzi 1302–1315
- Gillo of Villalta 1315–1316
- Cassono della Torre 1316–1318
- Pagano della Torre 1319–1332
- Bertram of St. Genesius 1334–1350
- Nicolaus of Luxemburg 1350–1358
- Lodovico della Torre 1359–1365
- Marquard of Randeck 1365–1381
- Philip II of Alençon 1381–1387
- Jan of Moravia 1387–1394
- Antonio I Caetani 1394–1402
- Antonio II Panciera 1402–1412
- Antonio III da Ponte 1409–1418 (1409–1412 opposite patriarch)
- Louis of Teck 1412–1435 (Ludovico II or Ludwig II of Teck)
- Ludovico Trevisan 1439–1465
- Marco I Barbo 1465–1491
- Ermolaio I Barbaro 1491–1493
- Niccolò II Donati 1493–1497
- Domenico Grimani 1498–1517
- Marino Grimani 1517–1529
- Marco II Grimani 1529–1533
- Marino Grimani (2nd time) 1533–1545
- Giovanni VI Grimani 1545–1574
  - Daniele I Barbaro, coadjutor 1550–1570
- Aloisio Giustiniani 1570–1585
- Giovanni VI Grimani (2nd time) 1585–1593
- Francesco Barbaro 1593–1616
- Ermolaio II Barbaro 1616–1622
- Antonio Grimani 1622–1628
- Agostino Gradenigo 1628–1629
- Marco Gradenigo 1629–1656
- Gerolamo Gradenigo 1656–1657
- Giovanni VII Dolfino 1657–1699
- Dionisio Dolfino 1699–1734
- Daniel II Cardinal Dolfino 1734–1751 (became Archbishop of Udine from 1752 to 1762)

Patriarchal See divided between the Archdiocese of Udine and the Archdiocese of Gorizia in 1752.

== See also ==
- Aquileian rite
- Councils of Aquileia
