= Aquileian Rite =

Liturgical tradition

The Aquileian Rite was a particular liturgical tradition of the Patriarchate of Aquileia and hence called the ritus patriarchinus. It was effectively replaced by the Roman Rite by the beginning of the seventeenth century, although elements of it survived in St. Mark's Basilica in Venice until 1807.

== History ==
The See of Aquileia under Bishop Macedonius broke communion with Rome in the Schism of the Three Chapters in 553 and became a schismatical patriarchate, a situation which lasted until the Council of Pavia in 698. A number of allusions tell us that Aquileia and certain of its suffragan sees had a special rite (generally called the ritus patriarchinus, or "patriarchine rite"); but they do not give any clear indication as to what this rite was.

There are many theories, especially as to the Aquileian Rite's relation to the rites of Milan, Ravenna, and the fragments in St. Ambrose of Milan's De sacramentis, IV, 4–6. Buchwald defends the view that the Eucharistic prayer in De sacramentis is actually Aquileian. Aquileia is supposed to have adopted it from Alexandria, Egypt, under whose influence she stood according to the synod of Aquileia of 381. The thesis adds that Rome then took her Canon from Aquileia around the fifth century. If this be true, Aquileia would be the portal by which the Roman Canon came to Europe. Baumstark, meanwhile, ascribes the De sacramentis to the see of Ravenna concurring that it came originally from Alexandria, Egypt and that Aquileia used the same rite. He contends that the ritus patriarchinus is the Rite of the Exarchate of Ravenna. From the time of the formation of separate rites in the fourth century, Aquileia would have certainly had its own use. This use was not the same as that of Rome, but was probably one more variant of the large "Gallican" group of Western Rites connected by (Eastern?) origin. It was probably related in actual fact to the ancient Milanese Rite and perhaps still more to that of Ravenna.

=== Fourth century ===
Rufinus of Aquileia's commentary on the Creed provides the baptismal creed of Aquileia, which differs in some details from the Roman or Apostles' Creed. He also hints at some local liturgical practices such as making a small sign of the cross on one's forehead at the words "[I believe] in the resurrection of this flesh." Related to this, De Rubeis, writing in the eighteenth century, notes that during the Angelus there was a custom within the territory of the former Patriarchate of Aquileia of touching one's chest when pronouncing the words, "And the Word was made flesh" (Et Verbum caro factum est.) indicating that Jesus Christ assumed a human nature so that "this" flesh might share in His divinity.

Chromatius of Aquileia has also left sermons and tractates which provide evidence of the Aquileian Rite.

=== Eighth century ===
The earliest and most instructive document of the Aquileian Rite is a capitulare of the eighth century added by a Lombard hand to the "Codex Richdigeranus" of the sixth century. Germain Morin and H. F. Haase, who edited the Codex, show reason to suppose that this capitulare represents the use of Aquileia.

The capitulare provides information about the Aquileian liturgical Calendar for the part of the year that it covers (Advent to June). Divergences from the Roman calendar include:

- Advent has five Sundays
- St. Stephen's Day is 27 December, as in the Rites of Jerusalem-Antioch and their descendants
- There is no Septuagesima; two Sundays (Sexagesima and Quinquagesima) prepare for Lent
- The "tradition of the symbol" is on the Sunday before Easter
- The "tradition of the symbol" and Maundy Thursday have each two Masses, as in the Gallican Rites
- There is a "Mid-Pentecost" feast, as in many Eastern Rites.

Ebner has published a variant of the present Hanc igitur of the Roman Canon, in litany form, attributed to Paulinus of Aquileia (787–802). Walafrid Strabo (later ninth century) mentions "hymns" composed by Paulinus of Aquileia and used by him "in private Masses at the offering of the sacrifice." De Rubeis in his De sacris foroiuliensium ritibus printed part of the Aquileian scrutiny of catechumens, of the ninth century. This is practically that of the contemporary Roman Ordines; so the Roman Rite was already replacing the other one. In the later Middle Ages the ritus patriarchinus yielded steadily to the Roman Rite.

=== High Middle Ages ===
It seems that the Rite of Aquileia had even been used in Venice since in 1250 Peter IV, Bishop of Castello petitioned the Pope for permission to adopt the Roman Rite. In 1308 and again in 1418 attempts were made to restore the Aquileian Use at Venice. But in 1456 Pope Callistus III granted permission to the newly created Patriarch of Venice to follow Roman liturgical practice.

=== Sixteenth century ===
After the Council of Trent and Pope Pius V's Missal (1570) one after another of the cities which had kept the Aquileian Use conformed to Rome: Trieste in 1586, Udine in 1596. Como alone made an effort to keep the old local use. In 1565 and 1579 diocesan synods still insisted on this. But in 1597 Pope Clement VIII insisted on Roman Use there too. Only St Mark's Basilica, still the chapel of the Doge and not yet cathedral of Venice, kept certain local peculiarities of ritual which apparently descended from the ritus patriarchinus until the fall of the Republic in 1807.

But long before its final disappearance, the Aquileian Rite in these local forms was already so romanized that little of its original character was left. Francis Bonomio, Bishop of Vercelli, who went to Como in 1579 to persuade its clergy to adopt the Roman Breviary, says that the local rite was almost the same as that of Rome "except in the order of some Sundays, and the feast of the Holy Trinity, which is transferred to another time". So the Missale pro s. aquileyensis ecclesiae ritu, printed at Augsburg in 1494, breviaries and sacramentaries (rituals) printed for Aquileia, Venice and Como in the fifteenth century, although still bearing the name of the ritus patriarchinus (or ritus patriarchalis), are hardly more than local varieties of the Roman Rite.

== Sources ==
- Federico Altan, Iter liturgicum foroiuliense (Rome, 1749)
- Carl Anton Baumstark, Liturgia romana, pp. 170–73
- Bona, Rerum litugicarum, II, ed. SALA (Turin, 1747), Appendix: De ritu antiquo Aquilejensis patriarchino nuncupato
- Burn, Nicetas of Remesiana (Cambridge, 1905);
- De Rubeis, Monumenta ecclesiae Aquilejensis (Strasburg, 1740)
- Dichlich, Rito veneto antico detto Patriarchino (Venice, 1823)
- Pierre de Puniet, "L'année liturgique à Aquilée" in Revue bénédictine, 1902, p. 1
- Ebner, The Mass (London, 1912)
- Le Brun, Ancien rite d'Aquilee appele le Patriarchin in his Explication de la messe, III (Paris, 1777), 220 sqq.
