= Paulinus I of Aquileia =

Paulinus I was the first Patriarch of Aquileia, serving from 557 to 571.

== Background ==
When he took over the see was in schism with Rome. When the Lombards invaded northern Italy in 568, Paulinus fled Aquileia with his treasures, as had the other Archbishop in schism with Rome, Honoratus of Milan. Paulinus transferred his see to Grado, a small island opposite Aquileia, which was still controlled by the Byzantines, but retained the title of Patriarch of Aquileia. He died soon after arriving in Grado.

== Bibliography ==
- Meyendorff, John (1989). Imperial unity and Christian divisions: The Church 450-680 A.D. Crestwood, NY: St. Vladimir's Seminary Press.
- Sotinel, Claire (2007). "The Three Chapters and the Transformations of Italy". The Crisis of the Oikoumene: The Three Chapters and the Failed Quest for Unity in the Sixth-century Mediterranean. Turnhout: Brepols. pp. 85–120.
