= Schism of the Three Chapters =

Split within the Roman Catholic Church

The Schism of the Three Chapters was a schism that affected Chalcedonian Christianity in Northern Italy lasting from 553 to 698 AD and in some areas to 715 AD, although the area out of communion with Rome contracted during that time. It was part of a larger Three-Chapter Controversy that affected the whole of Roman-Byzantine Christianity.

== Background to the Three-Chapter Controversy ==
The Three-Chapter Controversy arose from an attempt to reconcile the Non-Chalcedonian (Miaphysite) Christians of the Middle East with the positions of the Council of Chalcedon. To exact a compromise, works of several Eastern theologians such as Theodoret of Cyrus, Ibas of Edessa, and Theodore of Mopsuestia, which came to be known collectively as the Three Chapters, were condemned. The positions of the Three Chapters were particularly objectionable to the Miaphysites and, in an attempt to win them to the Council, the condemnation was issued.

The condemnation took the form of an Imperial Edict around 543, accompanied by the Tome of Pope Leo I that had been read at the Council of Chalcedon nearly one hundred years before. There was some resistance in the Greek speaking, eastern part of the Church, although in the end the leading Eastern bishops did agree to condemn it. Those who would not condemn these works were accused of being sympathetic to the heresy of Nestorianism.

== The original Break ==
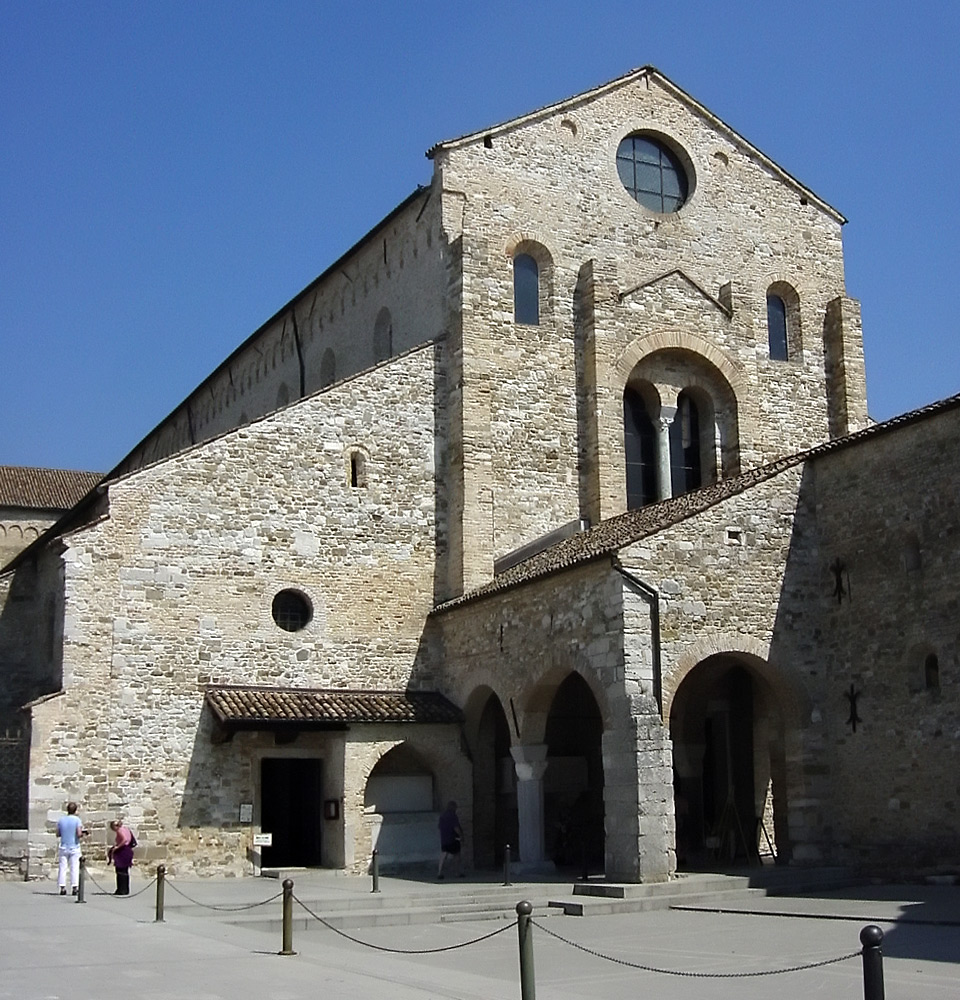
Basilica of Aquileia

In 553 by council, the bishops of Aquileia, Liguria, Aemilia, Milan and of the Istrian peninsula all refused to condemn the Three Chapters, arguing that to do so would be to betray Chalcedon. They broke off communion with Rome, under the leadership of Macedonius of Aquileia (535–556).

They in turn were anathematized by other churchmen.

The schism provided the opportunity for the bishop of Aquileia to assume the title Patriarch. Macedonius' successor Paulinus I (557–569) began using the title around 560.

== The Lombard Invasion ==
By the end of the next decade, the Lombards had overrun all of northern Italy.

In 568, the patriarch of Aquileia, Paulinus, was obliged to flee, with the treasures of his church, to the little island of Grado, near Trieste, a last remnant of the Eastern Roman Empire in northern Italy and eight miles to the south of Aquileia. This political change did not affect the relations of the patriarchate with the Apostolic See; its bishops, whether in Lombard or imperial territory, stubbornly refused all invitations to a reconciliation. The Synod of Grado in 579 confirmed this position.

With the exception of the patriarch of Aquileia, these bishops and most of their suffragans were now subjects of the Lombards and beyond the reach of the Byzantine Exarch at Ravenna. As a result, they were able to maintain their dissent in support of the schism.

== The Schism in Milan ==
The Bishop of Milan was Dacius, who was at Constantinople at the time and strongly opposed the condemnation of the Three Chapters, going so far as to break off communion with Greek bishops who signed the condemnation. He died in Constantinople in 552 and took no direct part in the schism.

Bishop Honoratus of Milan fled the city when it was besieged by the Lombard Alboin in 568. Honoratus sought refuge in Byzantine-controlled Genoa with a great number of his clergy. At his death there was a split with the Milanese clergy at Genoa electing Laurentius II, and the Christians remaining in Milan electing Fronto. Laurence subscribed to the condemnation while Fronto observed the schism with Rome.

Communion between Milan and Rome was restored around 581.

== The Schism in Grado ==
The seat of the Patriarch of Aquileia stayed in Byzantine controlled Grado. The Byzantines allowed these freedom and archbishop Elias, already called patriarch by his suffragans, built a cathedral under the patronage of St. Euphemia as an unabashed statement of his adherence to the schism since it was the church of St. Euphemia in which the sessions of the Council of Chalcedon were approved. Gregory the Great's attempts at conciliation near the end of his pontificate, and especially through the Lombard queen, Theodelinda, began to have some effect.

Thus, in 606, Elias's successor Severus died and there were many clerics favorable to reconciliation. The Byzantines encouraged these to elect Candidianus who once elected promptly restored communion. Those of his suffragans whose sees lay within the empire joined him in submission to the Apostolic See.

== The Split of the Patriarchate of Aquileia ==
Many bishops whose dioceses were under Lombard control were unhappy with the reconciliation. These dissidents fled to mainland Aquileia and under Lombard protection elected a John as a rival patriarch who maintained the schism. There were now two patriarchates in northern Italy, Aquileia in Grado and Old-Aquileia.

The diocese of Como was originally a suffragan of Milan, but by the mid 6th century, prompted by its disagreement with the reconciliation of Milan, Como renounced its connection with Milan and passed to being a suffragan to Aquileia, a situation which lasted until 1751. Moreover until 1597, Como continued celebrating the Aquileian Rite persisting in this even a year after that Rite had been abandoned at Aquileia itself and desisting only when the Pope ordered Como to abandon it, despite resistance.

== Reconciliation with Rome ==
The schism had deepened along political, Lombard-Roman lines. The Irish missionary Columbanus, who was ministering to the Lombards in Bobbio was involved in the first attempt to resolve this division through mediation between 612 and 615. Agilulf, King of the Lombards, persuaded him to address a letter on the schism to Boniface IV. He tells the pope that he is suspect of heresy for accepting the Fifth Ecumenical Council (the Second Council of Constantinople in 553), and exhorts him to summon a council and prove his orthodoxy.

Historian Edward Gibbon theorized that Pope Honorius I reconciled the Patriarch to Rome in 638, although this did not last.

As the schism lost its vigour, the Lombards started to renounce Arianism and join western apostolic and catholic orthodoxy. The bishop of Old-Aquileia formally ended the schism at the Synod of Pavia in 698. After Old-Aquileia reconciled with Rome, Pope Gregory II granted the pallium to Patriarch Serenus (715–730) of Aquileia in 723. The division of the Patriarchate of Aquileia into the rival Patriarchies of Aquileia and Grado contributed to the evolution of the Patriarch of Grado into the present Patriarch of Venice.

== Bibliography ==
- Meyendorff, John (1989). Imperial unity and Christian divisions: The Church 450-680 A.D. Crestwood, NY: St. Vladimir's Seminary Press. ISBN 9780881410563.
- Price, Richard M. (2007). "The Three Chapters Controversy and the Council of Chalcedon". The Crisis of the Oikoumene: The Three Chapters and the Failed Quest for Unity in the Sixth-century Mediterranean. Turnhout: Brepols. pp. 17–37. ISBN 9782503515205.
- Sotinel, Claire (2007). "The Three Chapters and the Transformations of Italy". The Crisis of the Oikoumene: The Three Chapters and the Failed Quest for Unity in the Sixth-century Mediterranean. Turnhout: Brepols. pp. 85–120. ISBN 9782503515205.
