= Council of Pavia (698) =

The council of Pavia of 698 was an ecclesiastical synod convoked by King Cunincpert to end the schism of the Three Chapters in the Lombard kingdom. The principal source for the synod is a contemporary Latin poem commissioned by the king, the Song of the Synod of Pavia. Although the council met in the Lombard capital of Pavia, two later sources—the History of the Lombards and the Liber Pontificalis—erroneously place the council in Aquileia.

Albrecht Berger suggests that the 10th-century Greek Life of Gregentios may dimly allude to the council of Pavia when it reports a story about discussions between Arians and Catholics in the context of Gregentios' visit to Pavia, since the anonymous author of the Life had access to a lost 8th-century north Italian source.
