= Hermagoras of Aquileia =

First bishop of Aquileia (fl. 3rd century – c. 305)

Saint Hermagoras of Aquileia
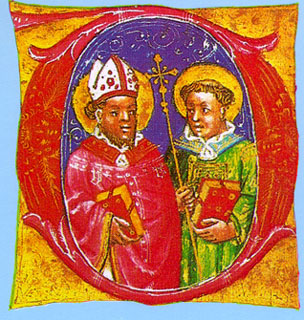
- Hermagoras and Fortunatus
- Died: traditionally ~70, but probably 3rd or 4th century Aquileia or Singidunum (Belgrade)
- Venerated in: Roman Catholic Church, Eastern Orthodox Church
- Feast: 12 July
- Attributes: depicted as bishop.
- Patronage: Aquileia, Udine

Hermagoras of Aquileia (also spelled Hermenagoras, Hermogenes, Ermacoras) (Italian: Sant'Ermagora, Friulian: Sant Macôr or Sant Ramacul, Slovene: sveti Mohor; fl. 3rd century – c. 305) is considered the first bishop of Aquileia, northern Italy. Christian tradition states that he was chosen by Mark to serve as the leader of the nascent Christian community in Aquileia, and that he was consecrated bishop by Peter. Hermagoras and his deacon Fortunatus (Italian: San Fortunato, Friulian: San Fortunât, Slovene: sveti Fortunat) evangelized the area but were eventually arrested by Sebastius, a representative of Nero. They were tortured and beheaded.

== Veneration ==
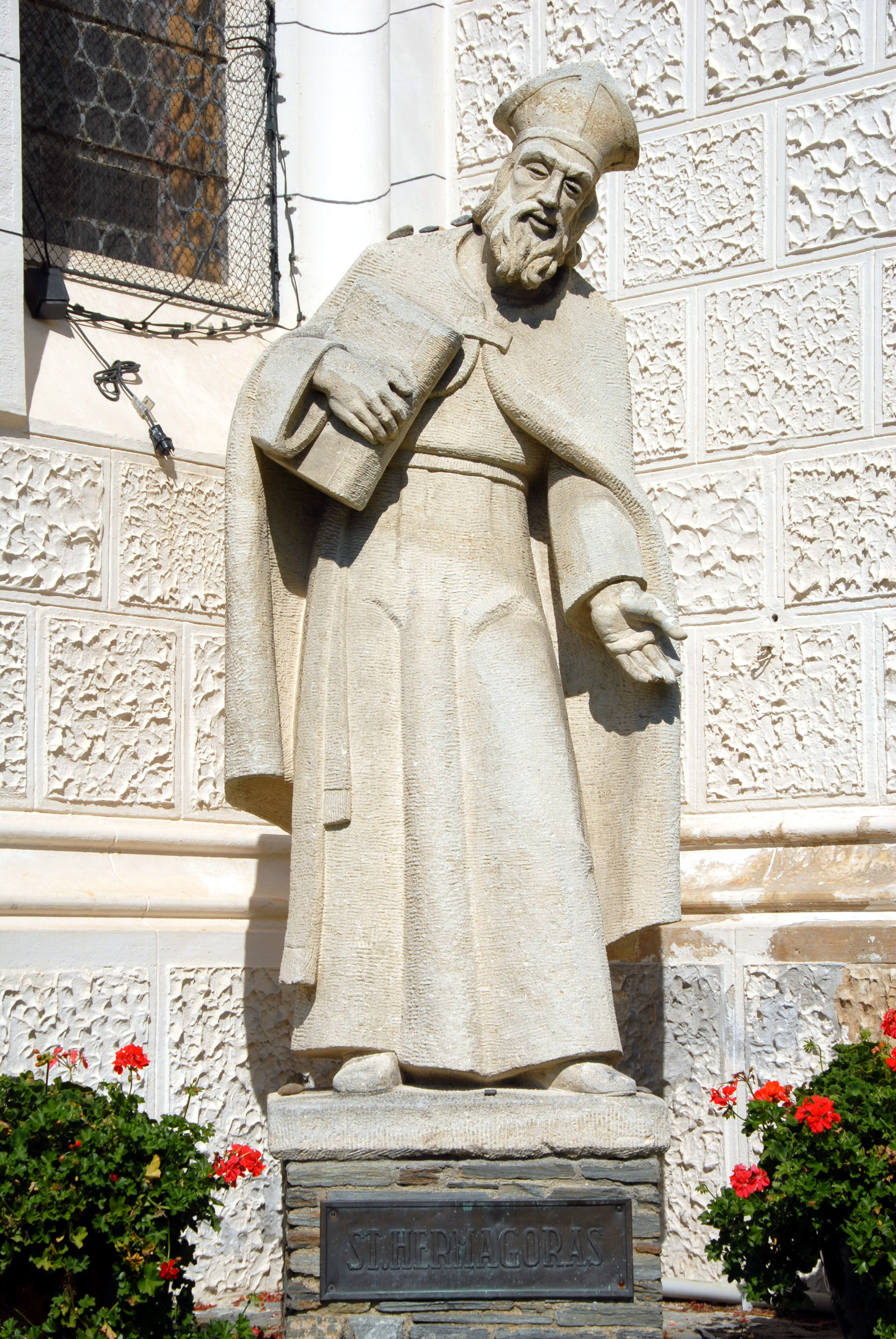
Statue of Hermagoras in the city of Hermagor.

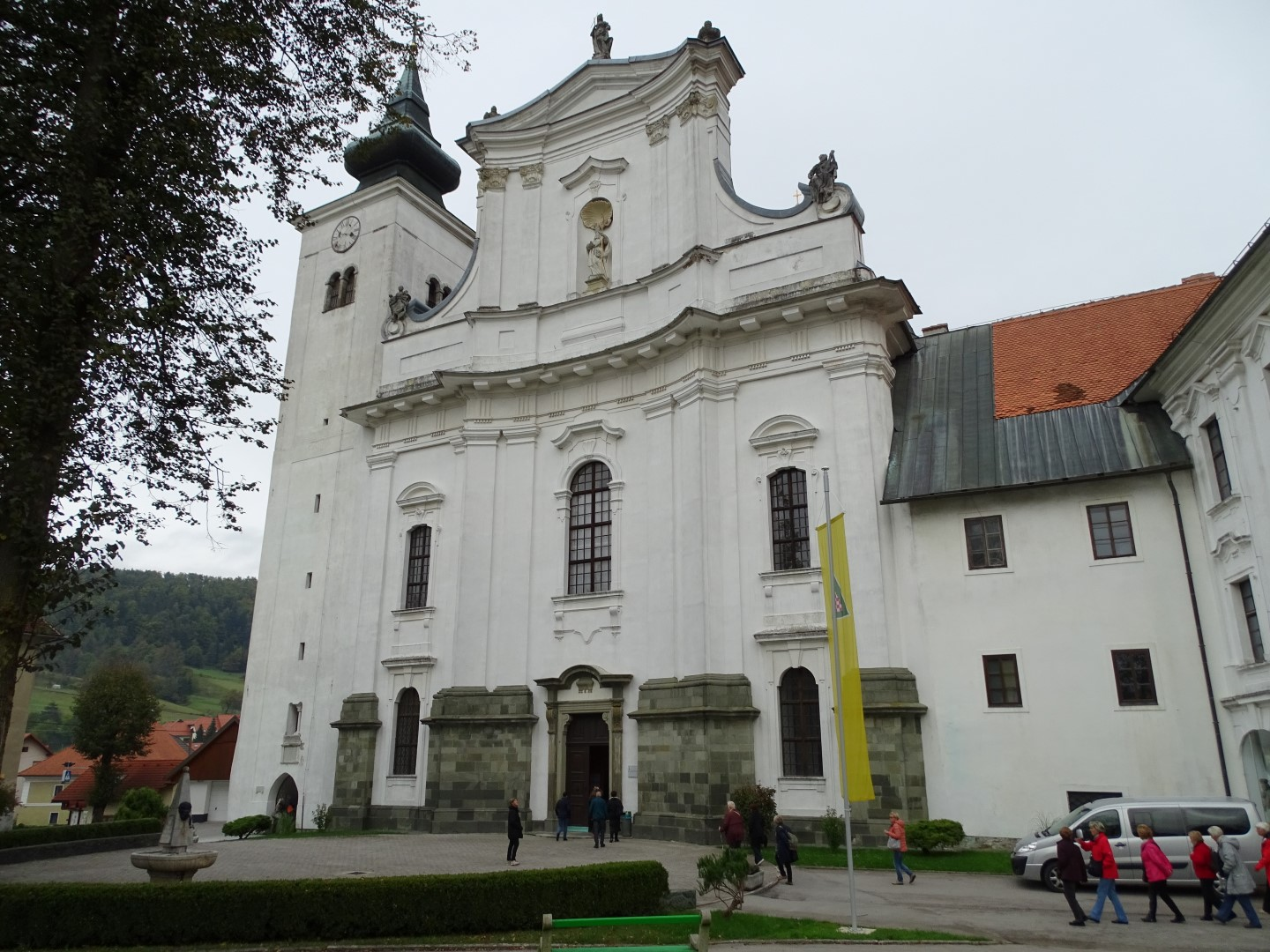
St. Hermagoras and Fortunatus Church in Gornji Grad, Slovenia

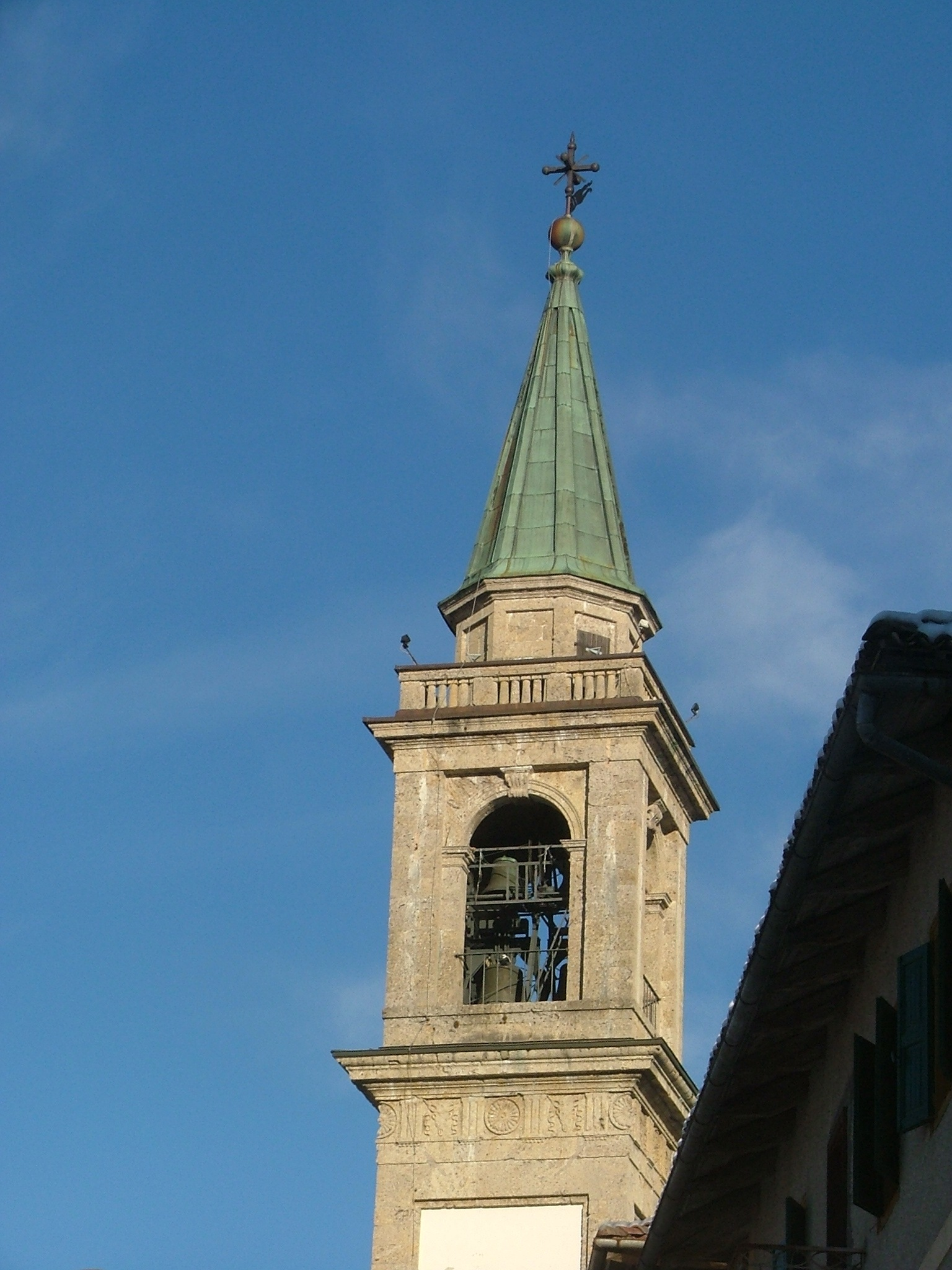
SS Ermagora and Fortunato's church-belfry, Lorenzago di Cadore, Veneto, Italy.

"Hermagoras" was listed as the name of the first bishop of Aquileia. He was probably a bishop or lector living in the second half of the 3rd century or at the beginning of the fourth. However, because the name or origins of the very first bishop was unknown, Aquileian traditions arising in the 8th century made Hermagoras a bishop of the apostolic age, who had been consecrated by Peter himself. As Hippolyte Delehaye writes, "To have lived among the Savior's immediate following was...honorable...and accordingly old patrons of churches were identified with certain persons in the gospels or who were supposed to have had some part of Christ's life on earth." Thus, false apostolic origins were ascribed to Hermagoras and the church at Aquileia. The tradition that Fortunatus was Hermagoras' deacon is also probably apocryphal, but a Christian named Fortunatus may have been a separate martyr at Aquileia.

Hermagoras and Fortunatus may have been martyrs killed in Singidunum (today's Belgrade). There, around 304 during the religious persecutions led by Emperor Diocletian, Hermagoras, or Hermogenes, was a lector and Fortunatus a deacon. Their relics may have been brought to Aquileia a century later, and that city became the center of their cult as it was at Aquileia that the belief in their apostolic origin arose. Aquileia was one of the first cities in which Christianity could be practised unhindered; the Patriarch of Aquileia was the second most important person of the Western Church after the bishop of Rome.

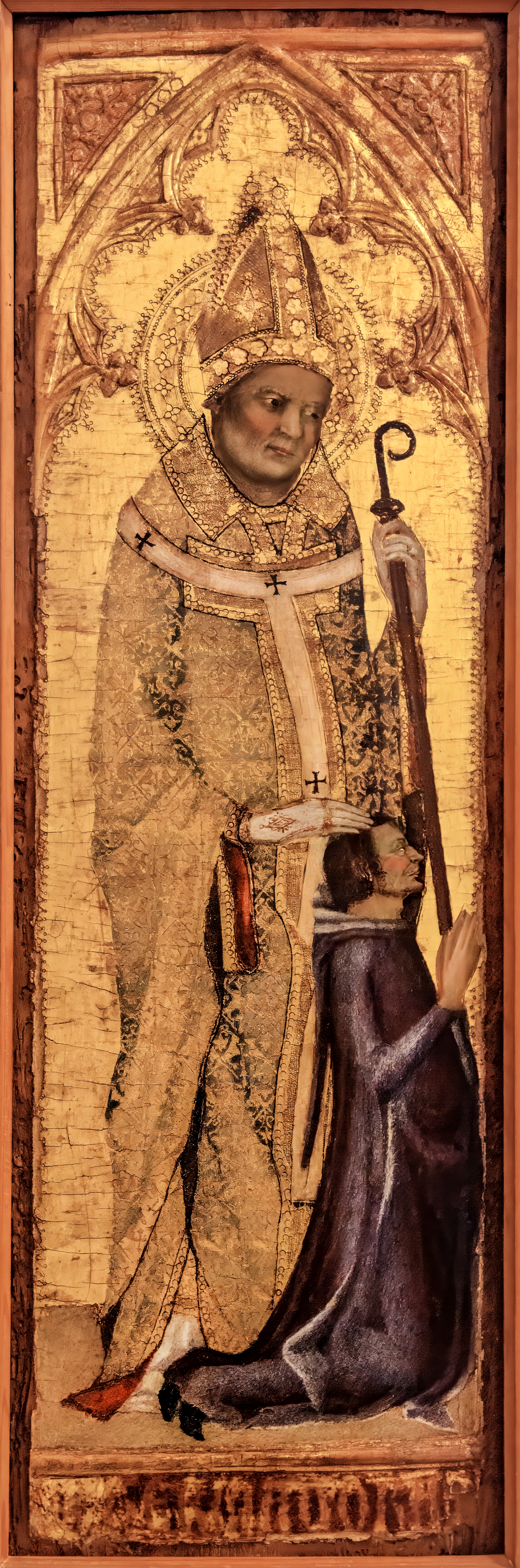
Saint Ermagora by Matteo Giovannetti, about 1345. Gold and tempera on panel, 55 x 18 cm. Venice, Museo Correr

Their feast day was recorded as 12 July, which was further recorded in the Roman Martyrology, the Church of Aquileia, and in various other Churches. However, Venantius Fortunatus did not mention Hermagoras in his works, but mentioned the name of Fortunatus twice: once in a life of Martin of Tours: Ac Fortunati benedictam urnam, and the second time in his Miscellanea: Et Fortunatum fert Aquileiam suum. The Martyrologium Hieronymianum mentions Hermagoras, but in a corrupted form: Armageri, Armagri, Armigeri. There is some confusion, as the Martyrologium Hieronymianum also lists "sanctorum Fortunate Hermogenis" under 22 or 23 August. The Bollandists considered this simply a repetition of the same saints. However, the cult of Saint Felix and Saint Fortunatus of Aquileia was also mentioned in calendars for 14 August.

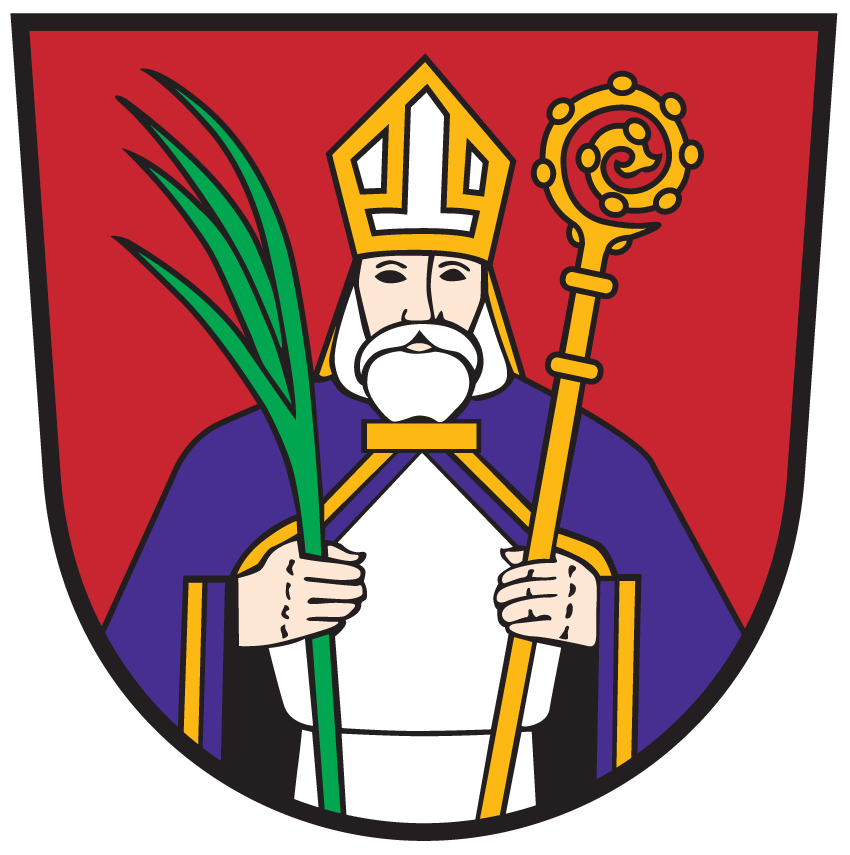
Hermagoras featured on the coat-of-arms of Hermagor

Hermagoras' name survives in the Carinthian city of Hermagor, in the modern state of Austria. His cult was also popular in Udine, Gorizia and Gurk. The basilica of Aquileia today contains 12th-century frescoes, one of which depicts Hermagoras and Peter.

Hermagoras and Fortunatus have been particularly venerated among the Slovenes because they were Christianised by missionaries from Aquileia. Since 1961, St. Hermagoras and St. Fortunatus have been the secondary patrons of the Archdiocese of Ljubljana, re-established that year; previously, from 1461 until 1961, they were the main patrons of the diocese. In Slovenia, there are altogether seven parish churches and 25 branch churches dedicated to St. Hermagoras and/or St. Fortunatus. The oldest Slovene publishing house, established in 1851, is named the Hermagoras Society (Mohorjeva družba). The village of Šmohor in eastern Slovenia (the Municipality of Laško) is named after St. Hermagoras.
