= Hadmar III of Kuenring =

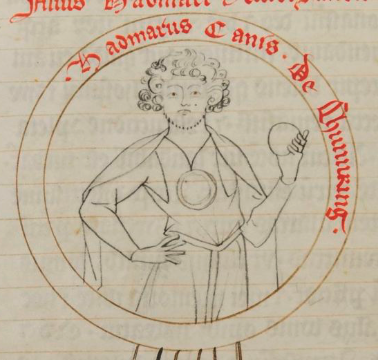
Hadmar III of Kuenring

Hadmar III of Kuenring (c. 1180–1231) was a medieval Austrian ministerialis from the house of Kuenring and son of the famous Hadmar II of Kuenring, who imprisoned King Richard the Lionheart at Dürnstein castle. He was famously called the 'Hound of Kuenring', alongside his brother, Henry III of Kuenring, for their martial prowess.

He, along with his brother, Henry III, took part in the Fifth Crusade with Leopold VI, Duke of Austria.

== The Altenburg Abbey Dispute ==
After Duke Leopold the Glorious died on 28 July 1230, disputes with his heir, Frederick II, Duke of Austria, infamously called the Warlike or Quarrelsome, rose up almost immediately. When Liutold and Conrad of Altenburg sent an appeal to Duke Frederick on 30 November 1230 for the demarcation of the abbey, the Kuenring brothers and their allies, the Sonnbergs under Hadmar I of Sonnberg, responded with vehement protest, declaring that such a thing would impoverish their houses. Frederick, in an act of apathy, waved it off and demanded they accept the new changes. This led to war in the early months of 1231, and it ended with the destruction of Sonnberg castle in April 1231. This dispute led to a complete enmity with Duke Frederick, and the forced acceptance of the Altenburg appeal. It became one of the basis for further rebellions in Austria.

== Issue ==
- Albero V of Kuenring, married in 1240 Gertrude of Wildon
- Henry II of Kuenring, married a Kunigunde
- Gisela, died before 1270, married Schetscho of Budevice

Hadmar III of Kuenring House of Kuenring Born: c. 1180 Died: c. 1231
German royalty
| Preceded by Hadmar II | Lord of Kuenring; 1217–1231; With: Henry I | Succeeded by Hadmar IV, Henry III, Albero V, Henry II |
