= Château du Nouveau-Windstein =

Ruined castle in Bas-Rhin, Grand Est, France

- Windstein
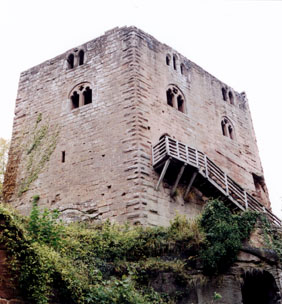
- Keep in the upper ward

Site information
- Type: rock castle
- Code: FR-A
- Condition: ruin

Location
- Coordinates: 48°59′38″N 7°40′41″E

Site history
- Built: ca. 1339
- Materials: rusticated ashlar

Garrison information
- Occupants: free nobility

The Château du Nouveau-Windstein (German: Burg Neuwindstein) is a ruined castle located on a hill west of the commune of Windstein in the Bas-Rhin département of France.

== History ==
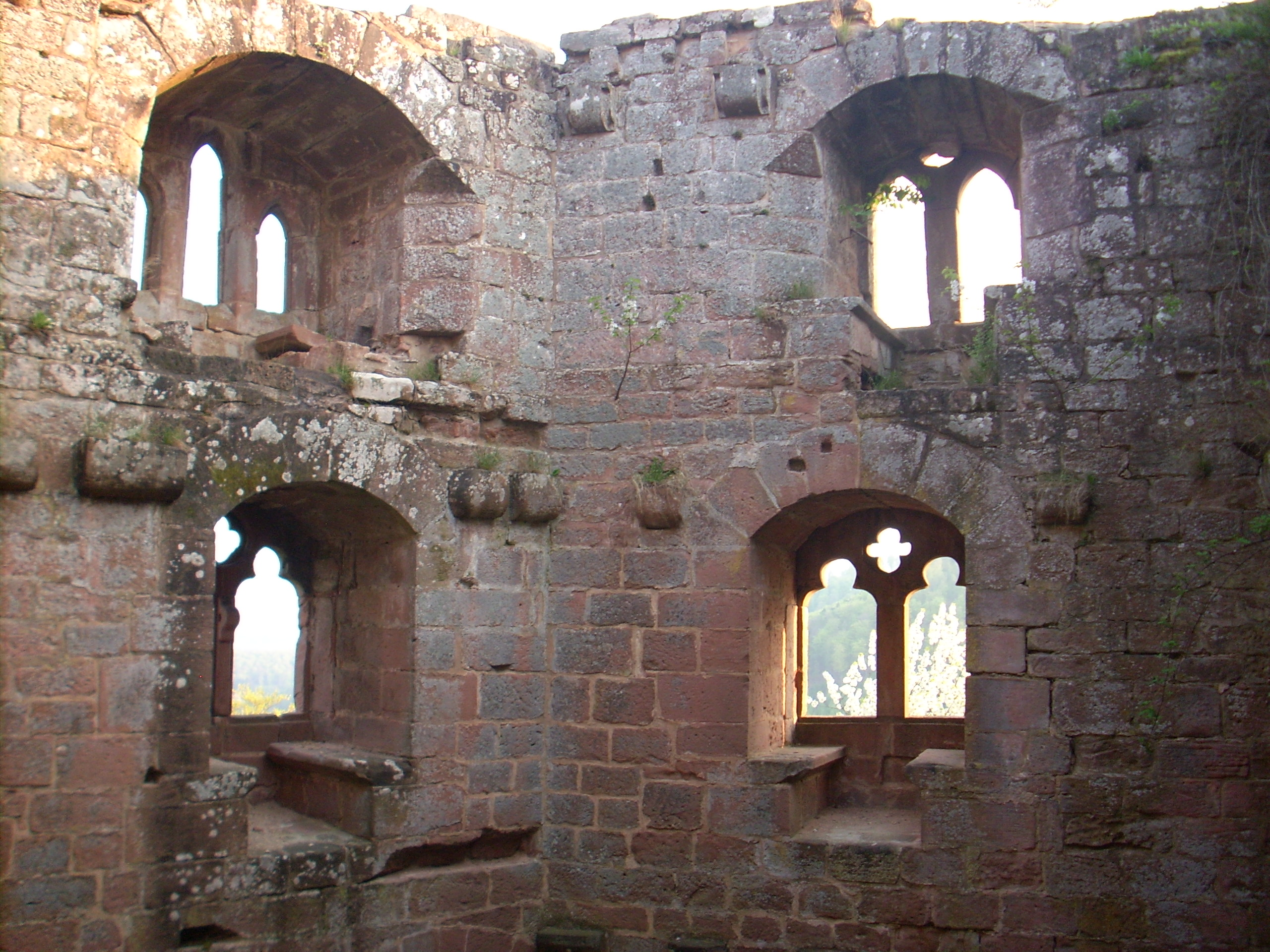
The inside of the keep

Previously it was assumed that the castle had been built after 1332, probably in 1339, by William of Windstein as a fief of the bishops of Speyer after the destruction of Château du Vieux-Windstein. This record of the construction of a castle, however, probably refers to one on the northern site of Vieux-Windstein. The late Romanesque and early Gothic style of Vieux-Windstein by contrast, proves that the castle must have already existed in the first half of the 13th century.

In the 14th and 15th centuries it was the joint property of the lords of Windstein with other families, such as the lords of Lichtenberg, the counts of Leiningen, the Electorate of the Palatinate and the Eckebrechts of Dürkheim. The lords of Windstein was extinguished when Hans Ostertags of Windstein died in 1480.

From the second half of the 17th century the castle was the sole possession of the Eckebrecht family of Dürkheim, but was destroyed in 1676 by the French after an unsuccessful defence by the Electoral Palatine colonel, Wolf Friedrich von Dürkheim. It was not rebuilt.

== Site ==
Today there are still extensive ruins, such as the (no longer accessible) keep of the upper ward with its shield wall, the remains of buildings in the lower ward and a barbican.

Unlike many other rock castles, only a few elements have been hewn out of the Bunter sandstone rock on which it is built. The foundation rock is also not as large as that of a typical rock castle. As a result, there are still massive walls made of rusticated ashlar.

It has been classified since 1983 as a monument historique by the French Ministry of Culture.

== See also ==
- List of castles in France

== Literature ==
- Thomas Biller: Die Burgengruppe Windstein und der Burgenbau in den nördlichen Vogesen. 30. Publication by the Department of Architecture of the Institute of Fine Arts at the University of Cologne, Cologne, 1985.
- Marco Bollheimer (2011), Felsenburgen im Burgenparadies Wasgau–Nordvogesen (in German) (3. ed.), Karlsruhe: Selbstverlag, pp. 136 f, ISBN 978-3-9814506-0-6
- Michel Vogt: Das goldene Zeitalter der Elsässischen Burgen. Ed. Cayelles, Barr 2001, ISBN 2-9509600-1-4.
- Felix Wolff: Elsässisches Burgen-Lexikon. Weidlich, Frankfurt/Main 1979, ISBN 3-8035-1008-2.
