= Henry III of Kuenring =

Henry III of Kuenring, or Heinrich III von Kuenring (c. 1185 – 1233) was a medieval Austrian ministerialis from the house of Kuenring and son of Hadmar II of Kuenring, who imprisoned King Richard the Lionheart at Dürnstein castle, and his wife Eufemia of Mistelbach. He was famously called the 'Hound of Kuenring', alongside his brother, Hadmar III of Kuenring, for their martial prowess. He married Adelheid of Falkenstein-Neuburg before 1205.

He, along with his brother, Hadmar III, took part in the Fifth Crusade with Leopold VI, Duke of Austria. Whether on or after the Crusade, Henry was given the position of Marshal of Austria, after the previous Marshal, Ulrich of Falkenstein-Neuburg, died childless, after or during the Fifth Crusade.

== The Altenburg Abbey Dispute ==
After Duke Leopold the Glorious died on 28 July 1230, disputes with his heir, Frederick II, Duke of Austria, infamously called the Warlike or Quarrelsome, rose up almost immediately. When Liutold and Conrad of Altenburg sent an appeal to Duke Frederick on 30 November 1230 for the demarcation of the abbey, the Kuenring brothers and their allies, the Sonnbergs under Hadmar I of Sonnberg, responded with vehement protest, declaring that such a thing would impoverish their houses. Frederick, in an act of apathy, waved it off and demanded they accept the new changes. This led to war in the early months of 1231, and it ended with the destruction of Sonnberg castle in April 1231. The dispute led to a complete enmity with Duke Frederick, and the forced acceptance of the Altenburg appeal. It became one of the basis for further rebellions in Austria.

== Issue ==
- Hadmar IV of Kuenring (ca. 1205-1250), died childless
- Henry V of Kuenring (ca. 1208-1241), died childless
- Eufemia of Pottendorf (ca. 1211-d. after 1282), had issue

Henry III of Kuenring House of Kuenring Born: c. 1185 Died: c. 1233
German royalty
Preceded by Hadmar II	Lord of Kuenring; 1217–1233; With: Hadmar III	Succeeded by Hadmar IV, Henry III, Albero V, Henry II
Preceded by Ulrich of Falkenstein-Neuburg	Marshal of Austria after 1217	Succeeded by ?
