= Hadmar II of Kuenring =

Hadmar II
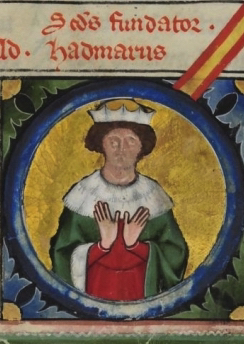
- Predecessor: Albero III
- Born: 1140
- Died: 22 July 1217
- Family: House of Kuenring
- Father: Albero III of Kuenring

Hadmar II of Kuenring (c. 1140 – 22 July 1217) was an Austrian ministerialis of the Kuenring family and son of Albero III of Kuenring. In 1192 he held captive Richard the Lionheart, King of England, at Dürnstein Castle.

Hadmar II also erected from 1201 to 1208 the city of Weitra. Because of the creation of this city, they are sometimes referred to in documents as "Lords of Kuenring-Weitra".

Hadmar is mentioned in the Stifterbuch (Liber fundatorum; the cartulary of Zwettl Abbey (Note: This manuscript from the early 14th century (Zwettl - Zisterzienser-Stift, Zwettler Bärenhaut (Stifterbuch, Liber fundatorum)) is also known as "Bärenhaut" (de). The German term literally translates as bear hide or bear skin, however in this case a herd boar ("Saubär"or "Zuchteber") is hiding behind the word Bär.)) as second founder (secundus fundator) of the monastery.

Hadmar's sister Gisela (d. after 1192) was married to Leutwin of Sunnberg.

== Literature ==
- Die Kuenringer - Das Werden des Landes Niederösterreich, Katalog zur Niederösterreichischen Landesausstellung 1981, Herausgeber und Verleger: Amt der Niederösterreichischen Landesregierung, Abt. III/2 - Kulturabteilung, 2. verbesserte Auflage

== Issue ==
Hadmar II of Kuenring had four children:

- Albero IV of Kuenring, died childless after 1220
- Hadmar III of Kuenring
- Henry I of Kuenring married Adelheid of Falkenstein-Neuburg
- Gisela, married Ulrich of Falkenstein

== Notes ==
Hadmar II of Kuenring House of Kuenring Born: 1140 Died: 22 July 1217
German royalty
Preceded by Albero III	Lord of Kuenring; 1182–1217	Succeeded by Hadmar III with Henry I
