= Albero III of Kuenring =

Albero III of Kuenring (1115 - 18–15 August 1182) was a ministerialis from the noble house of Kuenring in Austria. He was the first-born son of Albero I of Kuenring, who died around 1118.

== Issue ==
Albero married a woman named Elizabeth and they had two children:

- Hadmar II of Kuenring
- Gisela (died after 1192), who married Leutwin of Sonnberg (died after 1190/92)

Albero III of Kuenring House of Kuenring Born: 1115/18 Died: 15 August 1182
German royalty
Preceded by Hadmar I	Lord of Kuenring; 1138–1182	Succeeded by Hadmar II
