= Schloss Rabenstein =

Castle in Austria

Coordinates: 47.246°N 15.309°E

- Styria, Austria
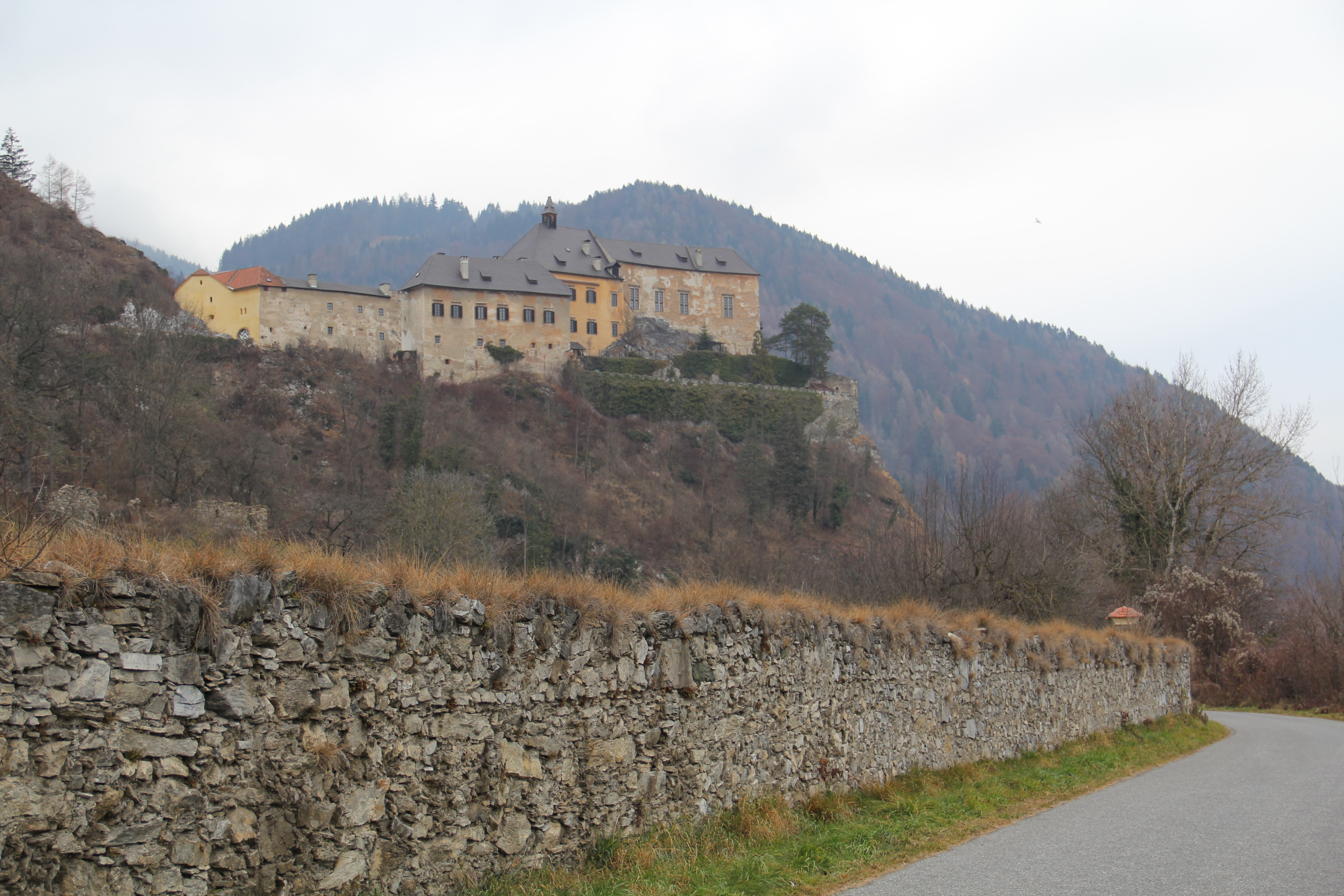

Site information
- Type: Rock castle

Site history
- Built: 12th century

Schloss Rabenstein is a castle in Styria, Austria. Schloss Rabenstein is situated at an elevation of 374 meters.

== See also ==
- List of castles in Austria
