= Hadmar I of Kuenring =

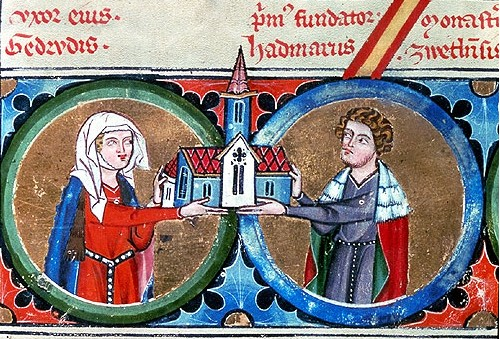
Hadmar I and Gertrud. Detail from the Kuenring pedigree (Bärenhaut), Zwettl Abbey, 14th century

Hadmar I of Kuenring (alt. spelling Hademar; died 27 May 1138) was a German nobleman who served as a ministerialis in the Margraviate of Austria (Ostarrîchi).

== Biography ==
Hadmar first appeared in an 1125 deed, in the service of the Babenberg margrave Leopold III. He probably was the son of Nizzo, who served as a burgrave on the castles in Krems and Gars. While many sources refer to Hadmar as a (great-)grandson of legendary Azzo of Gobatsburg, more recent research has shown this to be incorrect.

He is credited for the construction of Kühnring castle (in present-day Lower Austria), which became the ancestral seat of the Kuenring noble family. Hence, Hadmar was the first member of the dynasty to style himself "of Kuenring" from 1132 onwards. Hadmar also had Dürnstein Castle erected in his Wachau estates, where about sixty years later King Richard I of England was imprisoned after being captured near Vienna by Duke Leopold V of Austria.

In 1137, Hadmar and his wife Gertrud of Wildon founded the Cistercian abbey of Zwettl, along the lines of the late Margrave Leopold III who had founded Heiligenkreuz Abbey four years earlier. Hadmar died without issue the next year; like his brothers, and is buried in Göttweig Abbey. His relative Albero III of Kuenring succeeded to his lordship. The establishment of Zwettl Abbey was confirmed by King Conrad III of Germany and Pope Innocent II in 1139/40.

Hadmar I of Kuenring House of Kuenring Born: ? Died: 27 May 1138
German royalty
Preceded by Newly created	Lord of Kuenring ?–1138	Succeeded by Albero III
