= Dürnstein Castle =

Castle in Dürnstein, Austria

- Burgruine Dürnstein
- Dürnstein, Lower Austria, Austria
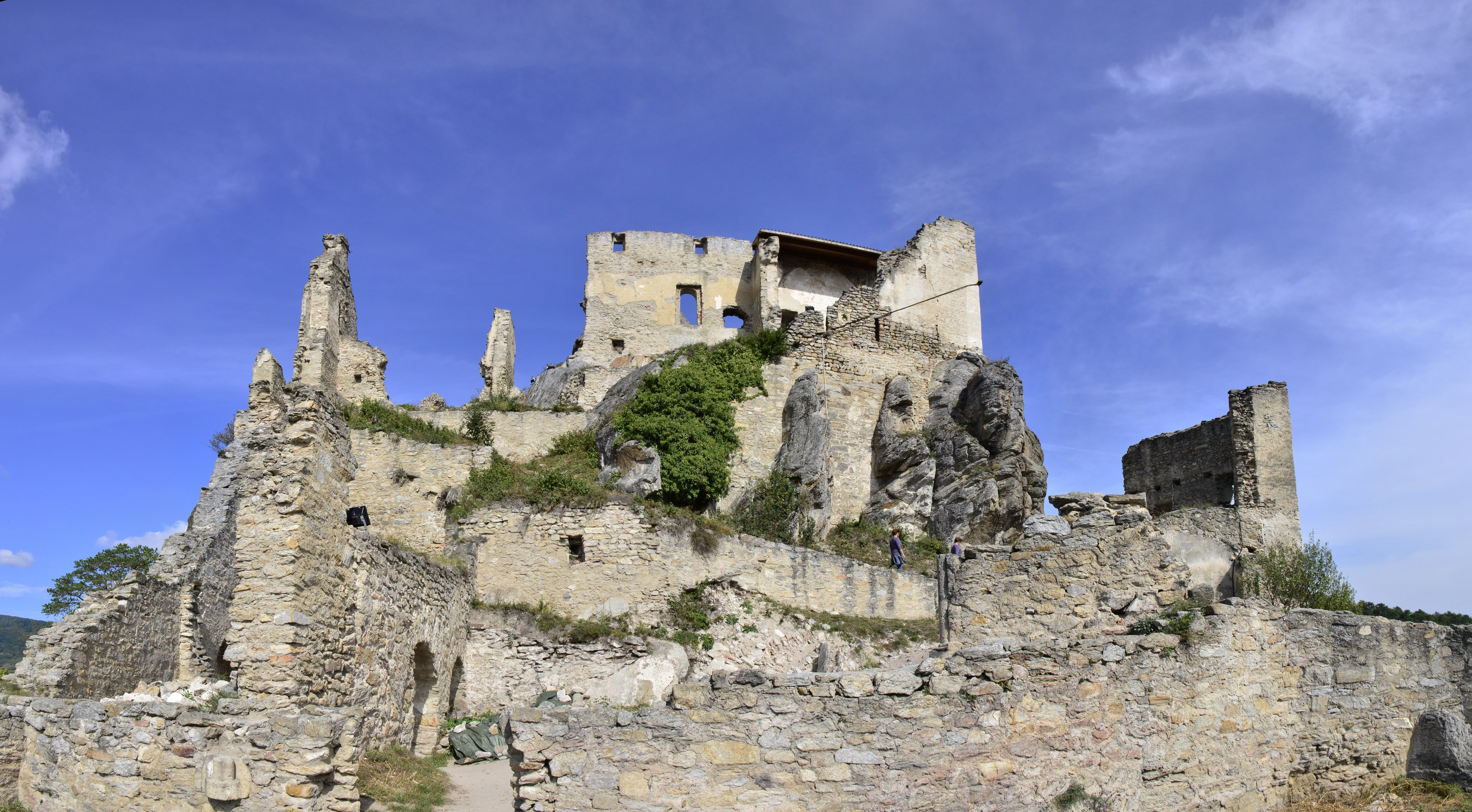
- South-eastern view of Dürnstein Castle

Site information
- Type: Rock castle
- Open to the public: yes

Location
- Coordinates: 48°23′52″N 15°31′19″E

Site history
- Built: about 1130
- Built by: Hadmar I of Kuenring
- Demolished: 1645

Dürnstein Castle (German: Burgruine Dürnstein) is the ruin of a medieval rock castle in Austria. It is located in Dürnstein, in the Lower Austrian Wachau region on the Danube river, at 312 metres (1,024 ft) above sea level.

== History ==
The castle was erected in the early 12th century at the behest of Hadmar I of Kuenring (d. 1138), a ministerialis in the service of Margrave Leopold III of Austria, on the estates his ancestor Azzo of Gobatsburg had acquired from Tegernsee Abbey in the late 11th century. Hadmar, who also founded nearby Zwettl Abbey, had the fortress constructed in a strategic location overlooking the river Danube. It is connected to Dürnstein through a defensive wall extending from the city walls.

The castle is known for being one of the places where King Richard I of England, returning from the Third Crusade, was imprisoned after being captured near Vienna by Duke Leopold V of Austria, from December 1192 until his extradition to Emperor Henry VI in March 1193.

In 1428 and 1432, Hussite forces plundered the city and castle of Dürnstein.

In 1645, near the end of the Thirty Years' War, a Swedish contingent under Lennart Torstensson conquered Dürnstein. Upon their withdrawal, the troops destroyed parts of the gate system. As of 1662, the castle was no longer inhabited permanently, but was still listed as a possible shelter in the Austro-Turkish War (1663–1664).

In 1663, Conrad Balthasar of Starhemberg purchased the castle, which is still owned by his heirs to this date. From 1679 on, however, the castle was no longer habitable and was abandoned. Today, the fortress is part of the "Wachau Cultural Landscape" UNESCO World Heritage Site.

== Gallery ==
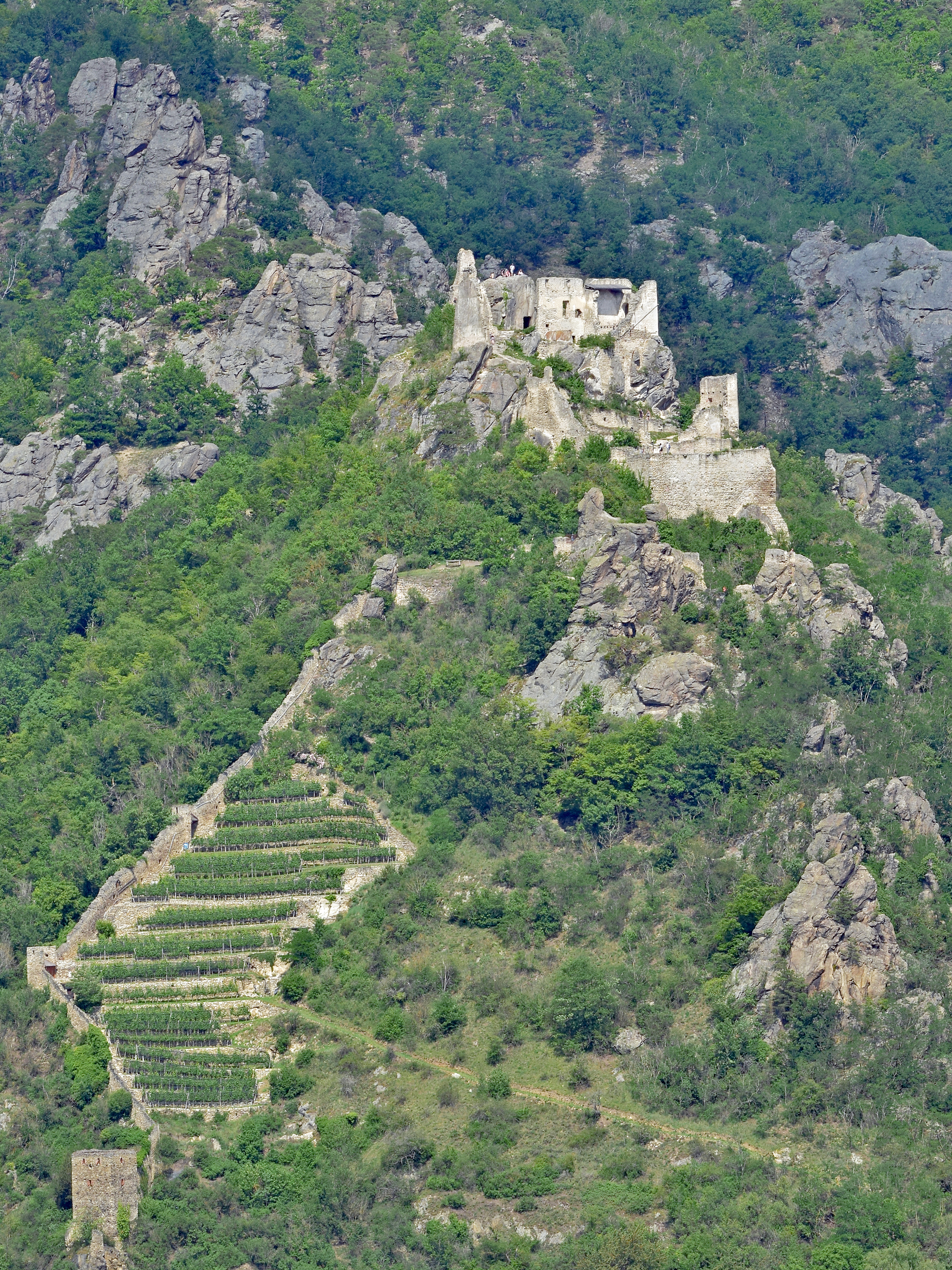
Castle from the east

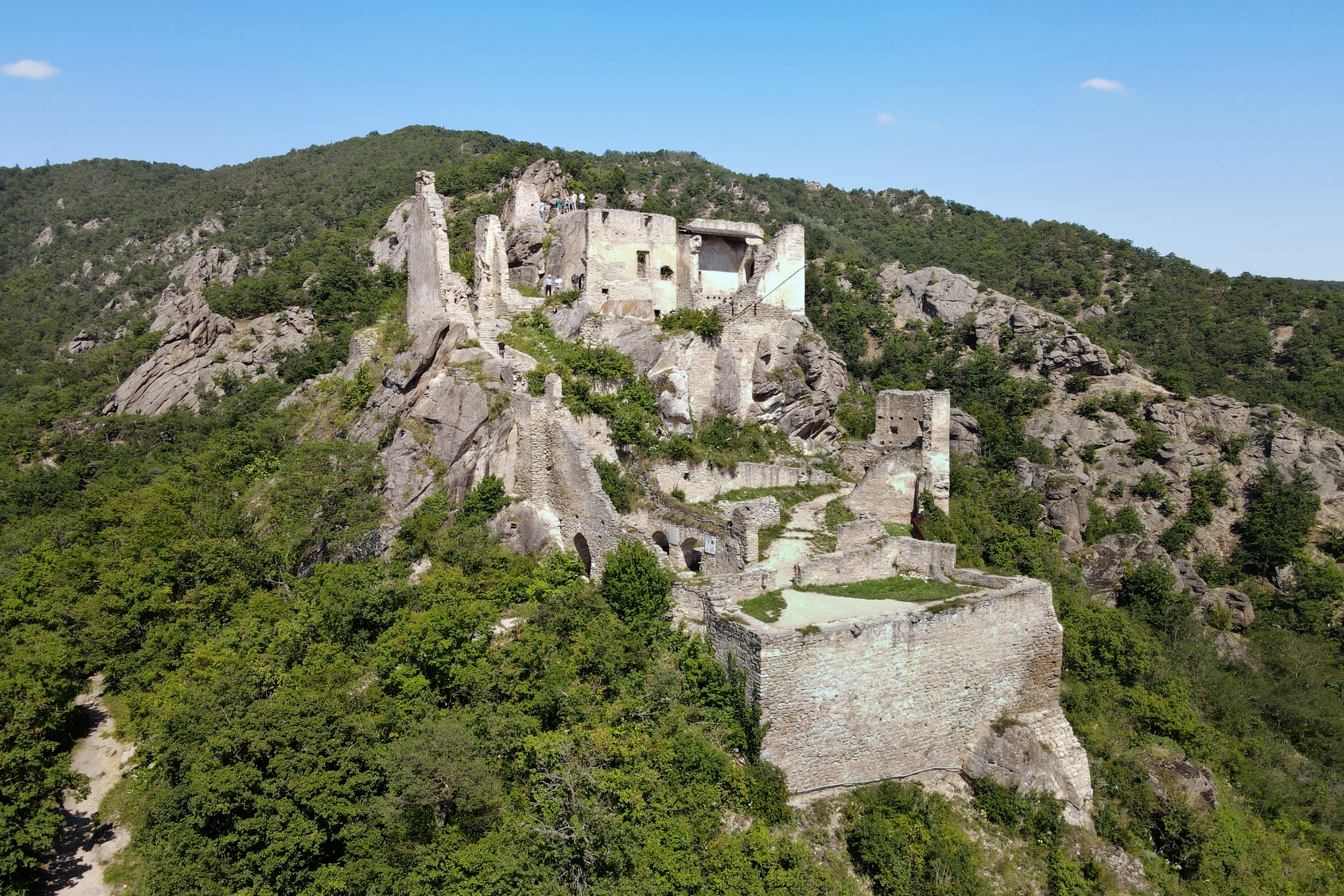
Southwest view of castle

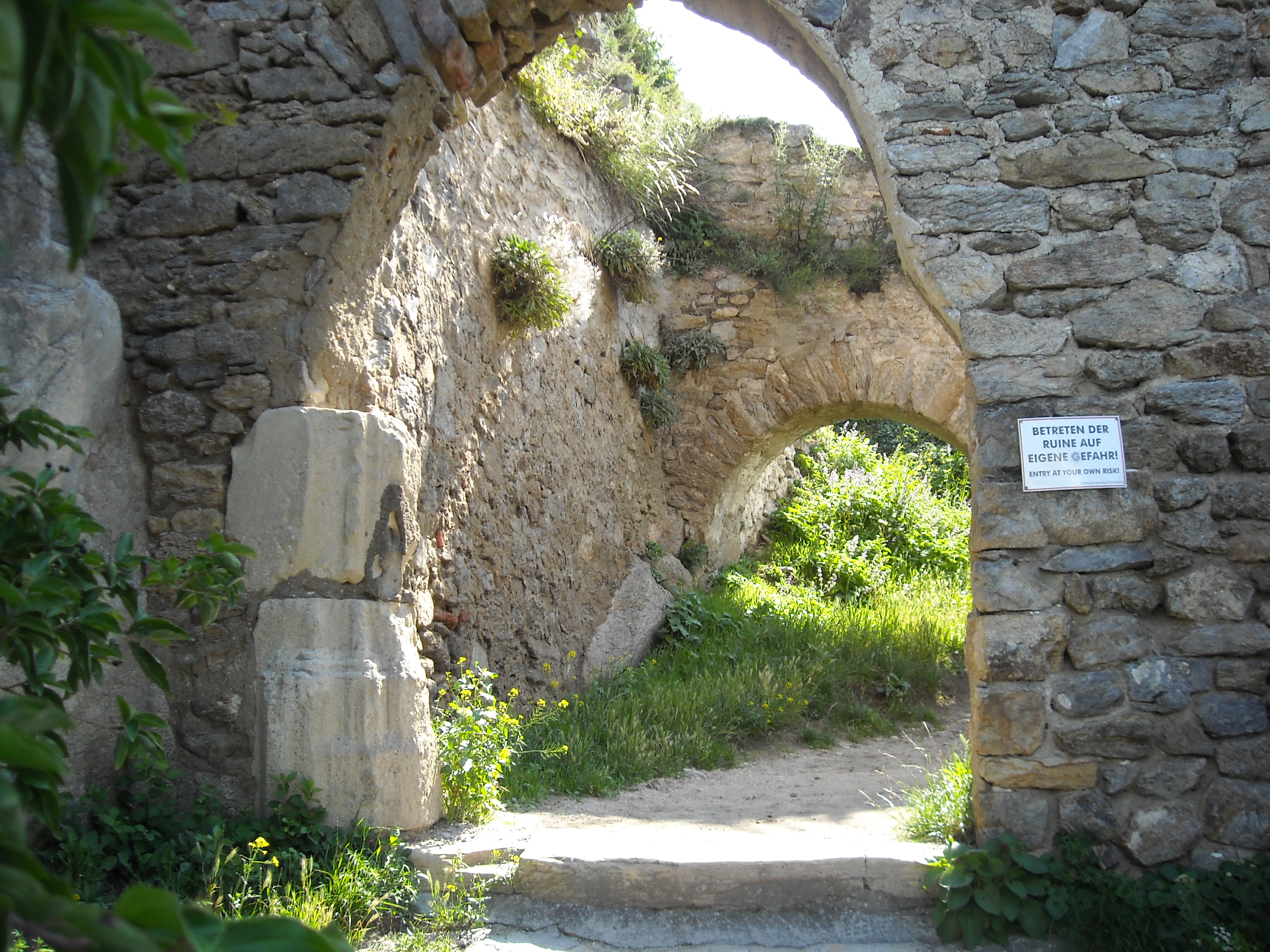
Archways inside the castle

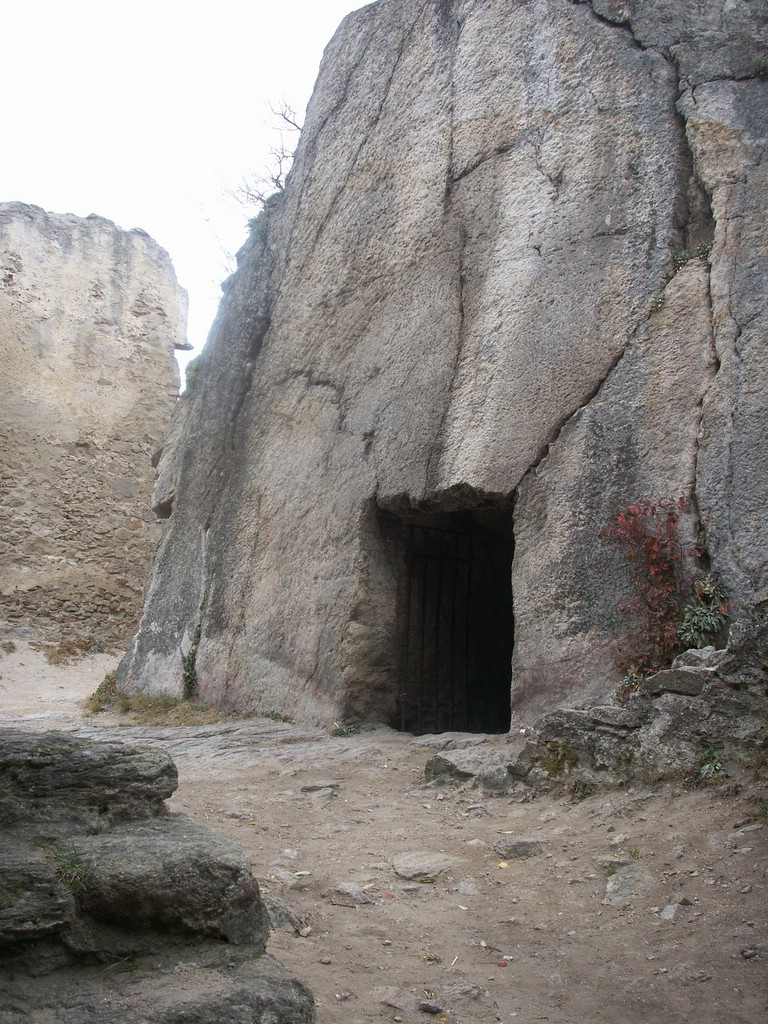
Cellar entrance, inner courtyard

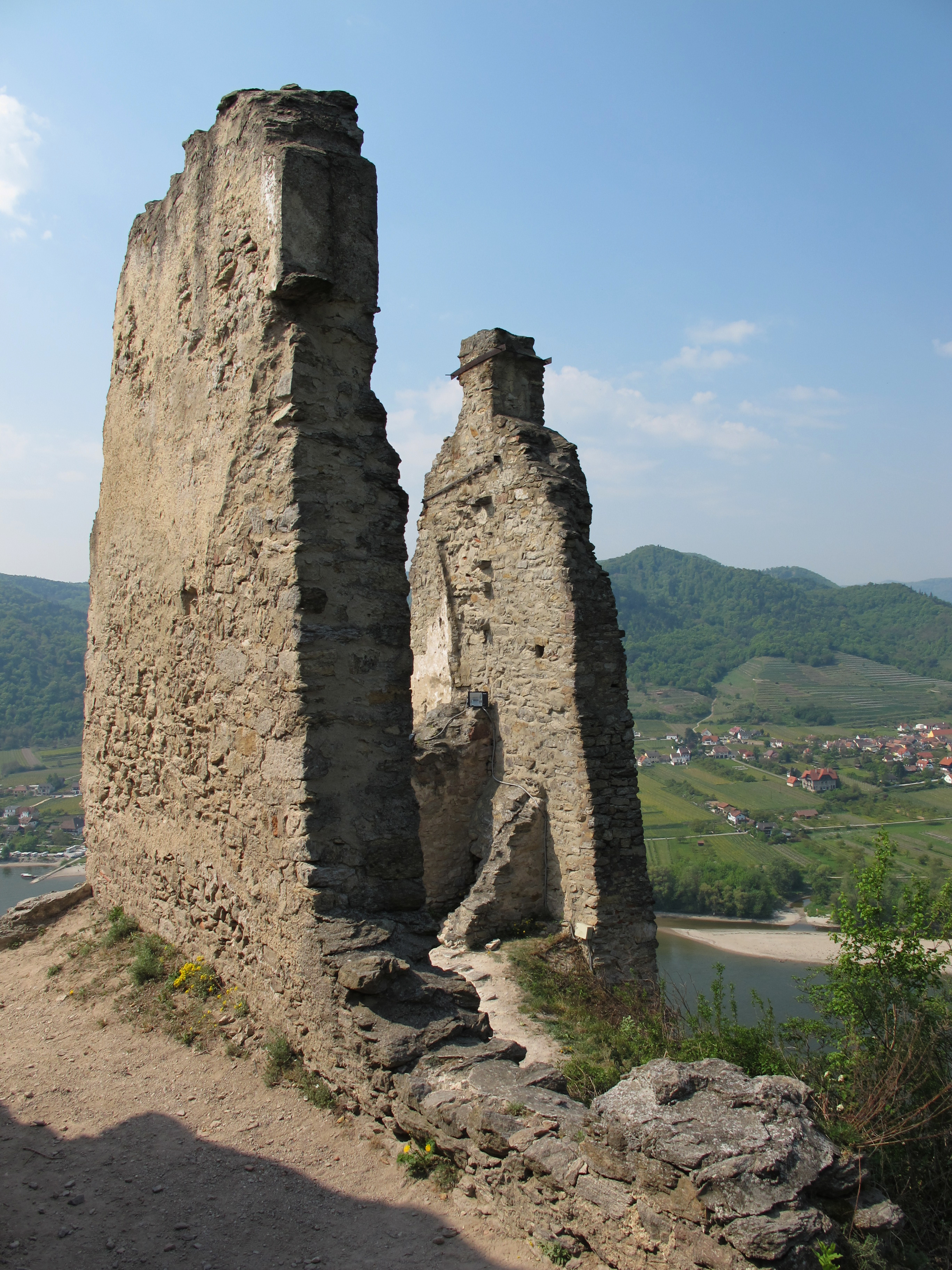
Main tower ruins

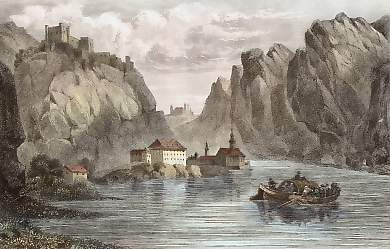
Engraving circa 1842

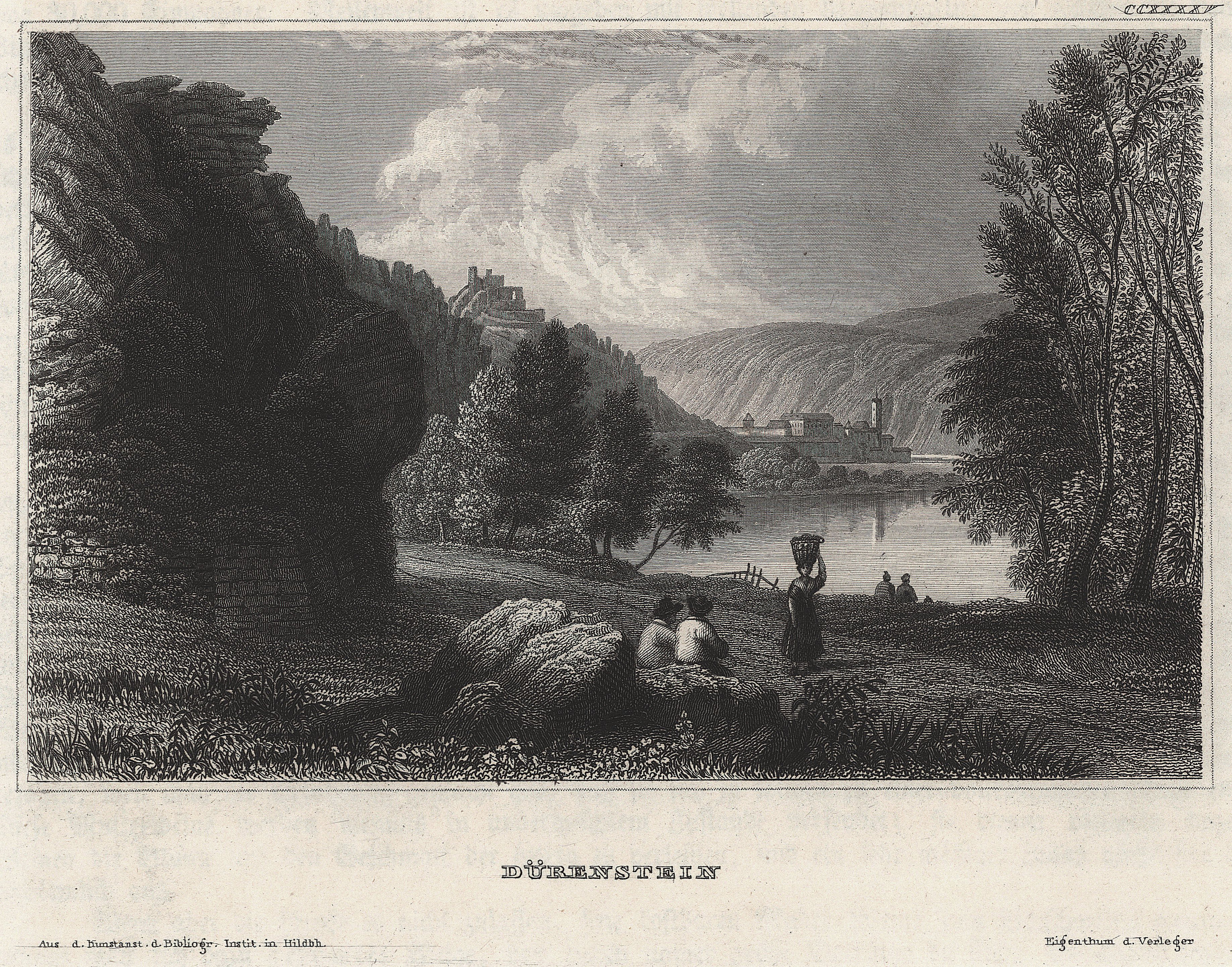
1839 illustration from the north

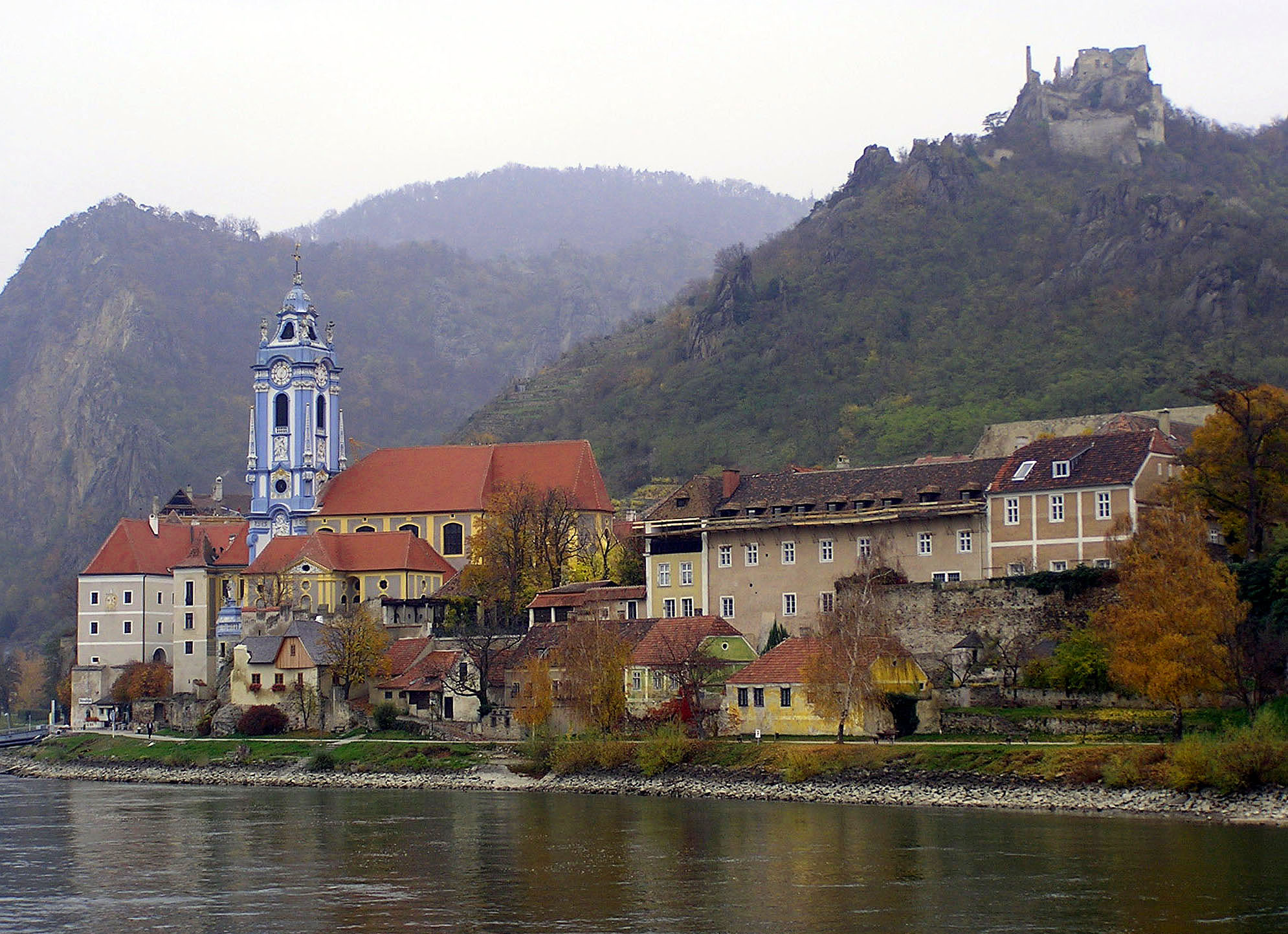
Town of Dürnstein with castle overlooking

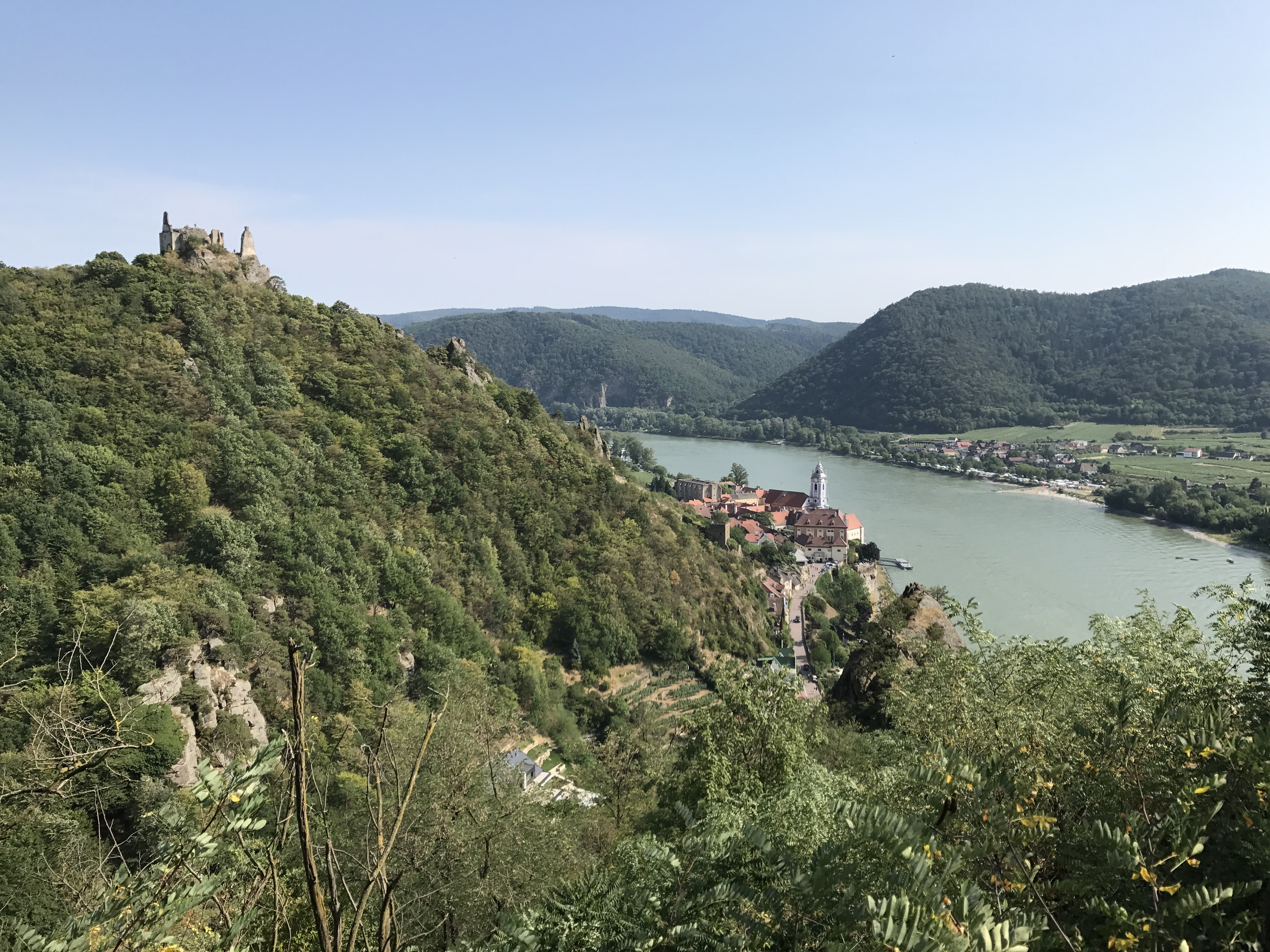
Castle and town from the north

== See also ==
- List of castles in Austria
