= Gestelnburg =

- Niedergesteln, Valais, Switzerland
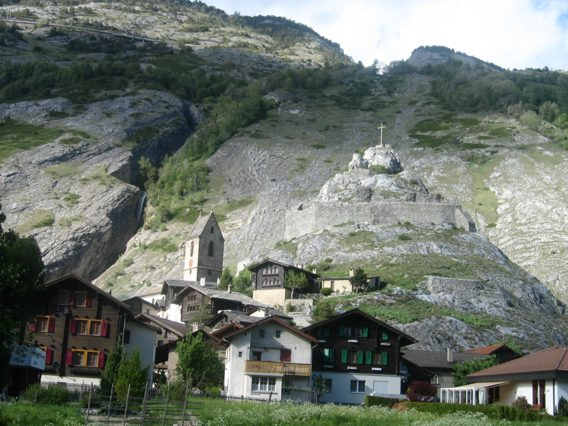
- Castle ruins and village Niedergesteln below.

Site information
- Type: Hill castle, rock castle
- Code: CH
- Condition: Ruins

Location
- Coordinates: 46°18′49″N 7°46′59″E

Site history
- Built: Probably 12th century
- Materials: Stone masonry

The ruins of the Gestelnburg castle are situated above the village of Niedergesteln in Valais, Switzerland, on a rocky ridge called Feschti. The castle was probably built during the 12th century by the powerful Barons de la Tour (English: Tower), which are also called in German Herrn vom Turn. The rule of this family ended during the wars against the bishop of Sion in the second half of the 14th century, and the castle was finally destroyed by the Upper Valaisans in 1384. Exactly 600 years later, a project was started to restore the ruins and make them more easily accessible. Behind the castle there is a cave called Feschtiloch, which originates from the last ice age. The Gestelnburg is a Swiss cultural property of national importance.

== Origin of the names ==
During the reign of the de la Tour family, French was spoken in the area. The castle was then called "Châtillon", translated into English means "castle", in latin "castellum", and "Gesteln" is a variation of these words. The village below the castle was called "Bas-Châtillion", which translated into English means "lower castle", from which the name "Niedergesteln" is derived. Note that the German word "nieder" means "lower" in English. The village of Obergesteln in Goms, in the Upper Valais, seems to have no connection with Niedergesteln, although its name has a similar origin. The name of the rocky ridge "Feschti" probably derives from the German "Festung", meaning a "fortress" in English. "Feschtiloch" is simply the hole under the fortress, since the German word "Loch" means "hole" in English.

== Location and access ==
The castle ruins are located on a rocky ridge close to 100 meters above the village. This ridge can be crossed through a cave, the so-called Festiloch. The ruins can be easily reached from the village with a wide walkway, which surrounded by life-size wooden sculptures representing the Barons de la Tour.

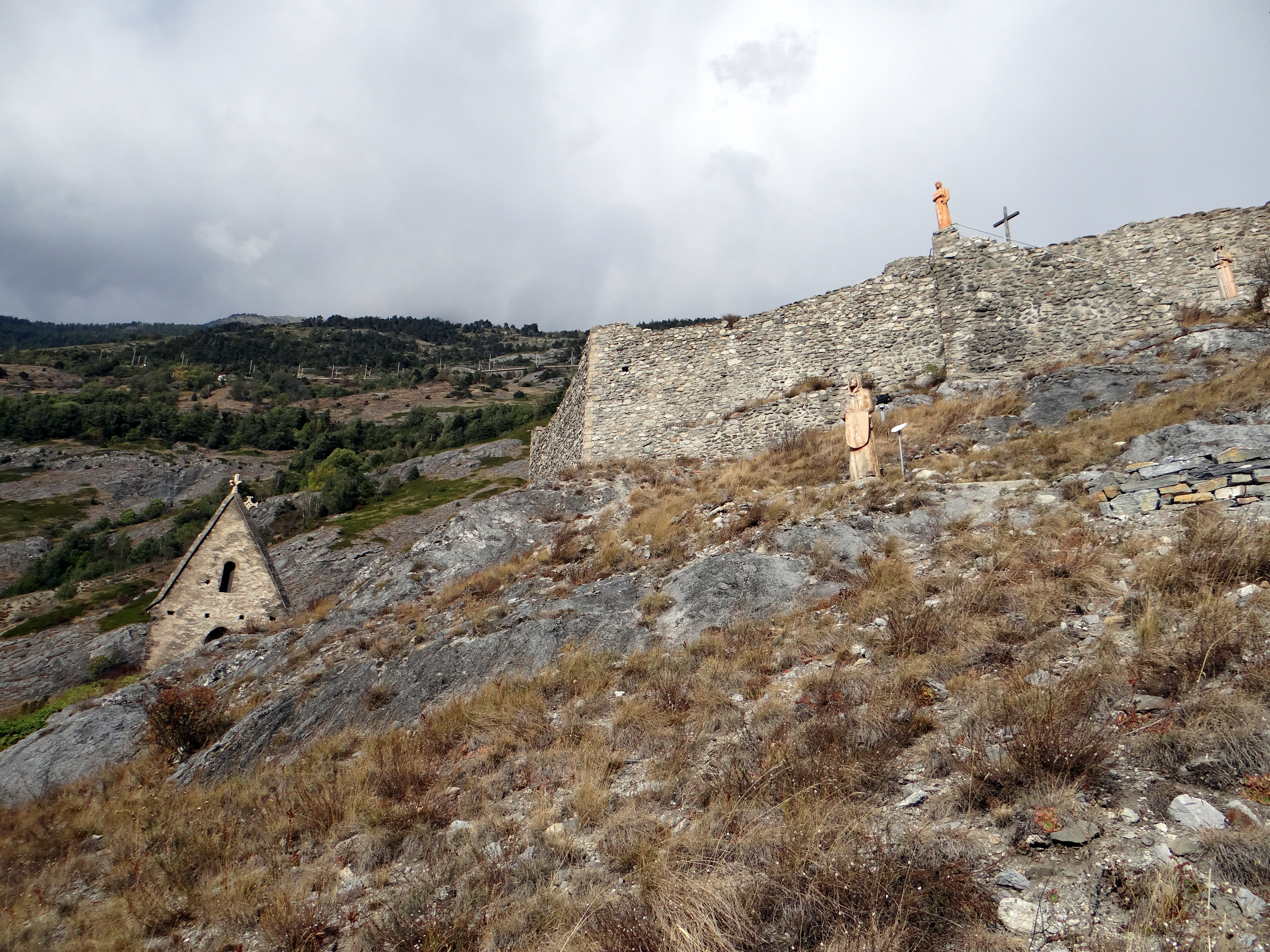
Ruins and wooden schulptures seen from below.

On the right, one can see the remains of the lowest fortification walls, of a water cistern, and of auxiliary buildings. Further up was the main building of the castle, with a floor plan measuring approximately 13 by 40 meters. This building occupied the entire width of the ridge and its walls, which are still preserved, have an impressive thickness of up to 3 meters. Uphill there is a moat, which, on one hand, protected the castle building from above, and, on the other hand, represented an obstacle to attain the uppermost part of the castle. The uppermost part was dominated by a round tower. Today, only the remains of the tower walls are visible, and a cross has been erected on this spot. The tower was protected by additional walls and by another moat from above. This castle could be defended very well and was able to withstand sieges successfully.

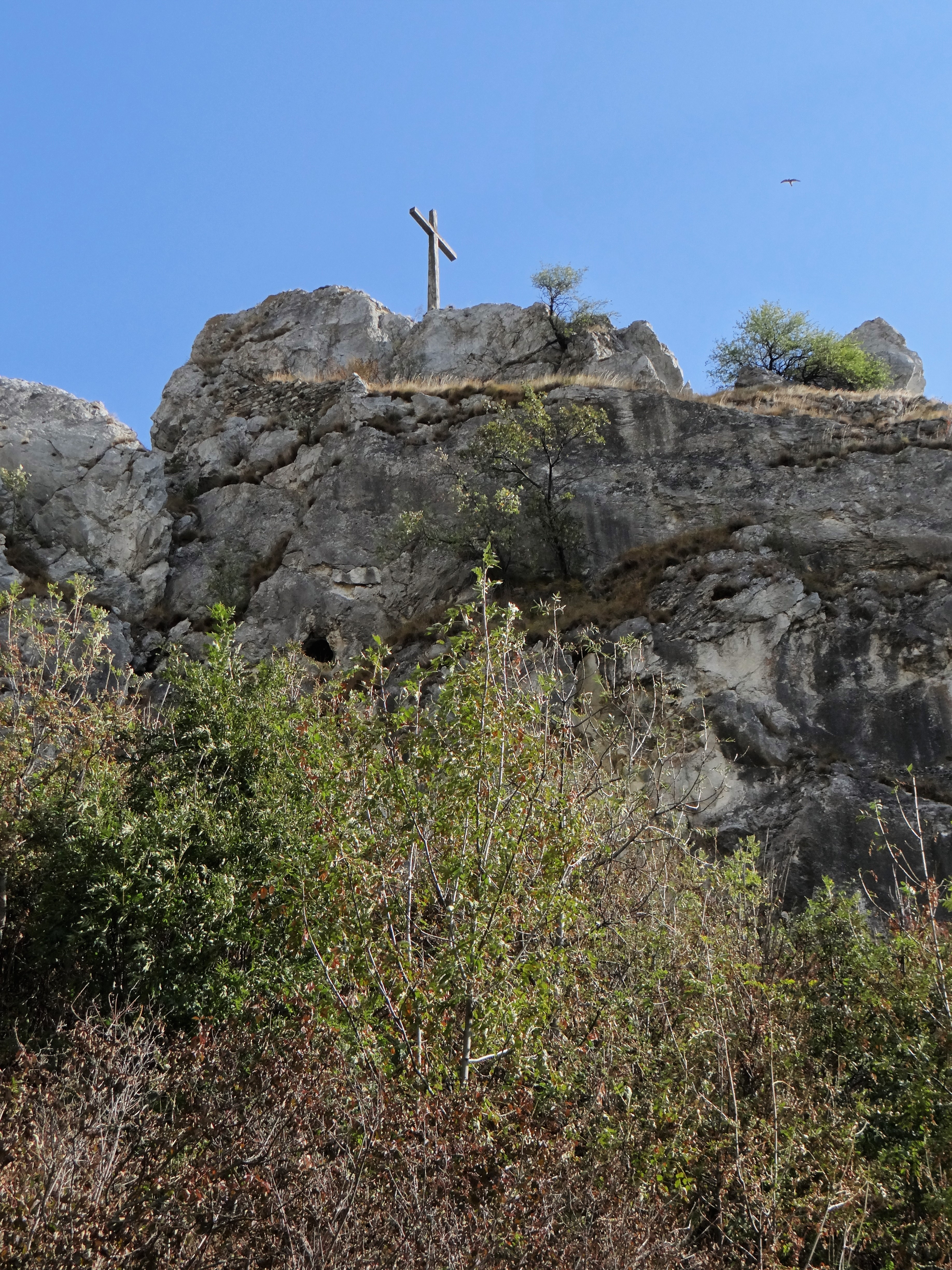
The wooden cross, which is now standing where the original tower was located.

== History ==
The Gestelnburg castle was the seat of the Barons de la Tour, which was one of the most powerful feudal families in Valais during the late Middle Ages. Their family probably descended from the Barons de la Tour du Pin from the Dauphiné, and their successors settled in the Valais in the 12th century. Amédée de la Tour was bishop of Sion at that time and belonged to this family too. This family then allied with the local knights and they have probably built the Gestelnburg castle together. However, there is clear evidence that the castle has been already built in 1235 and that it belonged to the de la Tour family then. At that time, this family was very influential. They owned not only various estates in Valais, but also in Chablais, Bernese Oberland, and Fribourg.

During the second half of the 14th century, violent battles took place between the feudal families and the Bishop of Sion. The hostilities were greatest between Bishop Guichard Tavelli and Antoine de la Tour. In 1362, Antoine attacked the nearby castle of Granges, which was the stronghold of the Tavelli family. In return, the bishop's troops plundered many of the possessions of the de la Tour family. In the meantime, the people from Upper Valais also took a stand against this family. They destroyed Niedergesteln and besieged the Gestelnburg, but the latter was unsuccessful. The weakened Antoine sought help from Amadeus VII of Savoy, who invaded the Valais with his army. In 1375, the hostilities reached their climax with the murder of the bishop Guichard Tavelli by the mercenaries of Antoine de la Tour at the nearby Seta Castle. The troops from the Upper Valais advanced further down the Valais, and they were able to defeat Antoine's army near Saint Léonard. Antoine was seriously wounded during the battle, but he was able to escape to Savoy. The family de la Tour did no longer recover from this defeat. Still, the castle was only taken by the troops from the Upper Valais in 1384 and was finally destroyed. Antoine, who is also called in German "Anton von Turn", is represented by one of the wooden sculptures at the Gestelnburg.

Exactly 600 years after the destruction of the castle, in 1984, the Pro Castellione Foundation was created. The aim of this foundation was to carry out archaeological excavations and to restore the castle. The work was completed in 1993. The most remarkable find during these excavations were the remains of a tiled stove, which are now kept in the Sion museum. On the tiles one finds reliefs of patterns, flowers, animals and people. The nature of these representations indicates a date of origin from the first half of the 14th century, which coincides with the peak of the de la Tour family. The wooden sculptures were also installed by this foundation.

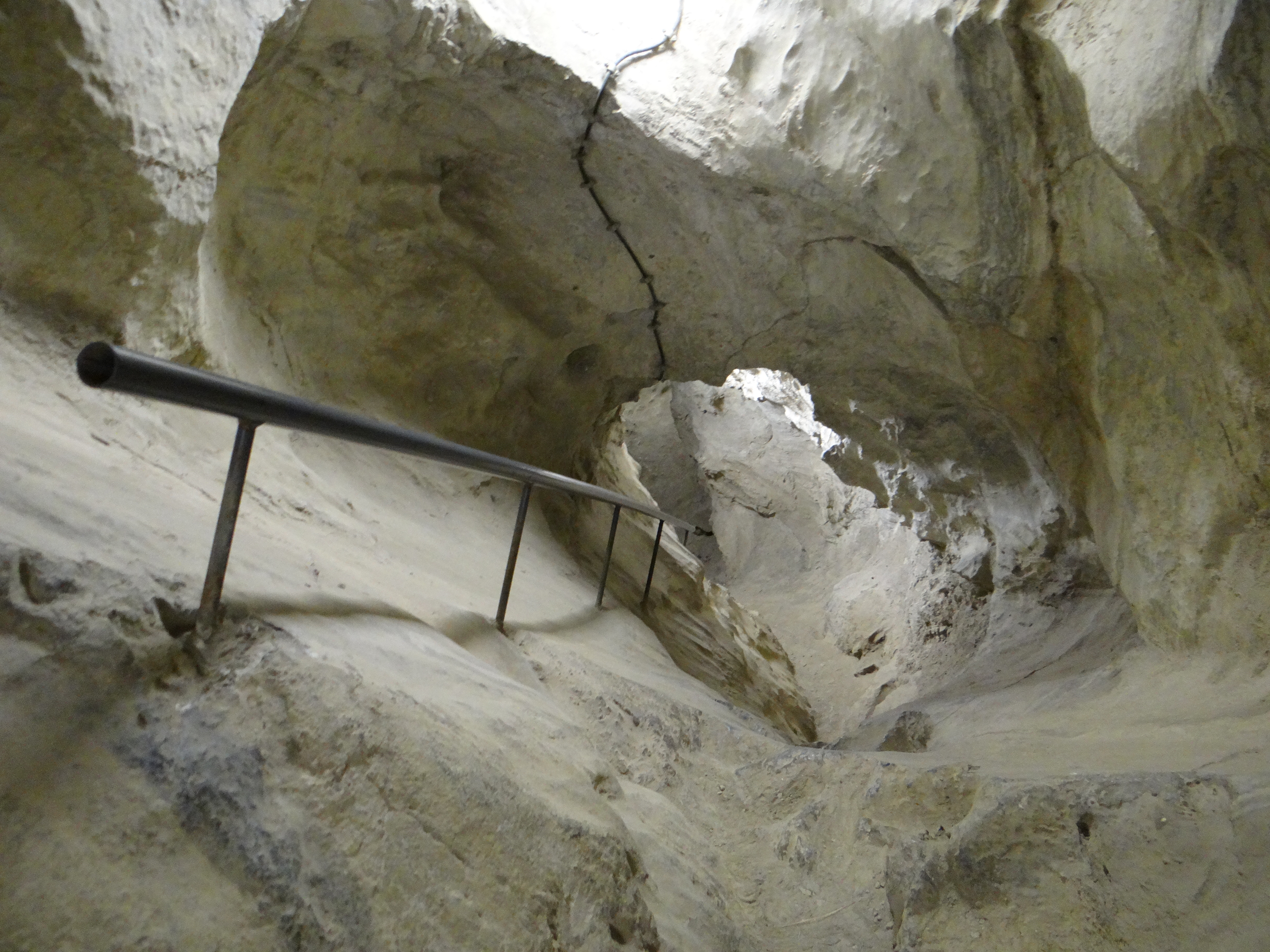
Looking into the Festiloch.

== Legends ==
There are several legends about the Feschtiloch, which are mostly similar, and therefore here only one variant: In the Feschtiloch there are three corridors, and in one of them there are three cauldrons of money. Each cauldron is guarded by a beast: the first by a poisonous snake, the second by a toad, and the third by a lion. On Christmas Eve you can take the money with you, but before that you must first kiss each of the beasts. But this must be done exactly during the consecration during the Holy Mass. In addition, the kettles are not easy to find, because they are only visible during the consecration too. Because of all these difficulties, it seems that nobody has been able to carry the kettles away yet, and they are probably still lying there.

== See also ==
- List of castles in Switzerland
- History of Valais
