= Nizzo of Krems-Gars =

Scion of the House of Kuenring

Nizzo of Krems-Gars (or Rizzo) was a scion of the house of Kuenring. He is known for his father, Azzo of Gobatsburg.

He married a woman named Truta, fathered four children with her -- Hadmar I, Albero II, Dietmar, and Pelegrin of Zwettl -- and died before 1114.

== Children ==
- Hadmar I of Kuenring, died childless on 27 May 1138
- Albero II of Kuenring, died childless around 1163
- Dietmar, born around 1098 and died around 1114, childless
- Pelegrin of Zwettl, died around 1166, Priest of Zwettl Abbey
