= List of Marshals of Austria =

The Marshal (German: Marschall) was the highest military rank in the Austrian monarchy.

== Babenberg Marshals ==
- Otto before 1177
- Albero 1177–1197
- Dietmar 1200–1203
- Ulrich of Falkenstein-Neuburg 1207–1217
- Henry I of Kuenring 1217–1233

After the death of Leopold VI, Duke of Austria in 1230, the Kuenrings kept the title Marshal of Austria until being forcibly removed by the Habsburgs.

== Habsburg Marshals ==
=== Land Marshals ===
- Herman of Landenberg 30 January 1282 – 10 December 1306
- Dietrich of Pilichdorf 3 March 1303 – 25 December 1326
- Ulrich V, Count of Pfannberg 30 December 1330 – 23 October 1354
- Herman of Landenberg 3 November 1358 – 8 July 1360
- Leutold of Stadeck 18 July 1360 – 16 January 1367
- Frederick of Walsee 15 June 1367 – 3 May 1368
- Haidenreich of Meissau 15 July 1368 – deposed before 17 March 1375
- Bernhard of Meissau 17 March 1375 – 7 July 1377
- Heidenreich of Meissau reinstated 18 December 1378 – 26 November 1380
- Rudolf of Walsee before 1 May 1384 – 2 February 1397
- Urich of Dachsberg 25 July 1397 – 1 April 1402
- Frederick of Walsee 6 February 1403 – 21 April 1405
- John, Burgrave of Maidburg 15 February 1406 – 6 August 1406
- Otto of Meissau 2 January 1407 – before 25 December 1407
- Hartnid of Pottendorf 16 June 1409 – 25 December 1407
- Pilgrim of Puchaim before 5 June 1417 – 8 August 1422
- John, Count of Schaunberg 23 June 1424 – 4 December 1424 deposed
- Hans of Winden 6 June 1425 – 11 November 1425
- Hans of Ebensdorf 28 June 1427 – 12 May 1433
- John, Count of Schaunberg reinstated 28 May 1437 – before 30 May 1439
- Rüdiger of Starhemberg 9 February 1441 – before 28 July 1446
- Bernhard, Count of Schaunberg 7 July 1447 – 4 April 1459
- George of Kuenring 3 April 1460 – 1464
- George of Pottendorf 31 January 1467 – 30 October 1471
- Michael, Burgrave of Maidburg 18 September 1475 – 24 March 1483
- Christoph of Liechtenstein 16 June 1488 – 1501

=== Under Marshals ===
- Michael the Uttendorfer 24 August 1386 – 15 June 1396
- Nicholas the Pottenbrunner 1397
- Gottfried of Wildungsmauer 25 January 1403 – 18 June 1404
- Egyd the Wolfsteiner 1405
- Plankenstainer 1406
- Hans the Greissenecker 1409
- George the Uttendorfer 1413
- Hans the Walich 1420–1433
- Albert the Wolfenreuter 1420–1433
- George the Pottenbrunner 1420–1433
- Hans Stockhorner 9 February 1438 – 27 October 1439
- Hans Walich 12 December 1442 – 28 October 1444
- Marchart Kerspeger 1445
- Wolfgang Oberhaimer 1454
- Leopold Wulzendorfer 31 January 1467 – 28 April 1477
- Wolfgang Dörr 16 June 1488 and again on 26 June 1489
- Caspar Schaul zu Molt 10 March 1494 – 1 May 1497

== Bibliography ==
- Wretschko, Alfred (1897). Das österreichische marschallamt im Mittelalter. Wien: Hof-Verlags und Universität-Buchhandlung.
