= Niedergesteln =

- Municipality
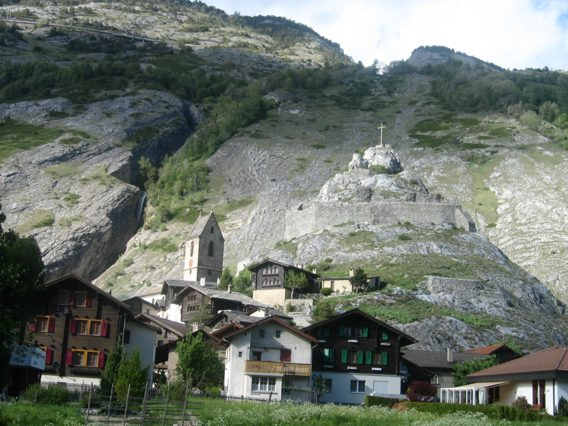
- Ruins of Gestelnburg above Niedergesteln village

- Flag Coat of arms
- Location of Niedergesteln
- Location within Switzerland Location within Canton of Valais
- Coordinates: 46°19′N 7°46′E
- Country: Switzerland
- Canton: Valais
- District: Raron

Government
  - Mayor: Josef Pfammatter

Area
  - Total: 17.4 km^{2} (6.7 sq mi)
- Elevation: 639 m (2,096 ft)

Population (December 2002)
  - Total: 616
  - Density: 35.4/km^{2} (91.7/sq mi)
- Time zone: UTC+01:00 (CET)
  - Summer (DST): UTC+02:00 (CEST)
- Postal code: 3942
- SFOS number: 6198
- ISO 3166 code: CH-VS
- Surrounded by: Eischoll, Ferden, Gampel, Hohtenn, Kippel, Raron, Steg, Turtmann, Unterbäch, Wiler (Lötschen)
- Website: www.niedergesteln.ch

Niedergesteln is a municipality in the district of Raron in the canton of Valais in Switzerland.

== History ==
Aerial view (1955)

Niedergesteln is first mentioned around 1179-84 as Chastellon. In 1224 it was mentioned as Castellion. The municipality was formerly known by its French name Châtillon-le-Bas, however, that name is no longer used.

== Geography ==
Niedergesteln has an area, as of 2011, of 17.5 square kilometers (6.8 mi^{2}). Of this area, 12.8% is used for agricultural purposes, while 28.3% is forested. Of the rest of the land, 3.0% is settled (buildings or roads) and 55.9% is unproductive land.

The municipality is located in the Westlich Raron district, on the northern edge of the Rhone valley.

== Coat of arms ==
The blazon of the municipal coat of arms is Impalled Azure issuant from Coupeaux Vert a house Argent, and Gules two Cavalry Sabres Argent hilted Or in saltire between three Mullets [of Six] Or one and two.

== Demographics ==
Niedergesteln has a population (as of December 2020) of 744. As of 2008, 4.6% of the population are resident foreign nationals. Over the last 10 years (2000–2010 ) the population has changed at a rate of 13.5%. It has changed at a rate of 6.5% due to migration and at a rate of 6.8% due to births and deaths.

Most of the population (as of 2000) speaks German (556 or 97.0%) as their first language, French is the second most common (8 or 1.4%) and Bulgarian is the third (3 or 0.5%). There are 2 people who speak Italian.

As of 2008, the population was 48.8% male and 51.2% female. The population was made up of 315 Swiss men (46.3% of the population) and 17 (2.5%) non-Swiss men. There were 329 Swiss women (48.4%) and 19 (2.8%) non-Swiss women. Of the population in the municipality, 330 or about 57.6% were born in Niedergesteln and lived there in 2000. There were 178 or 31.1% who were born in the same canton, while 32 or 5.6% were born somewhere else in Switzerland, and 16 or 2.8% were born outside of Switzerland.

As of 2000, children and teenagers (0–19 years old) make up 27.2% of the population, while adults (20–64 years old) make up 61.8% and seniors (over 64 years old) make up 11%.

As of 2000, there were 250 people who were single and never married in the municipality. There were 284 married individuals, 27 widows or widowers and 12 individuals who are divorced.

As of 2000, there were 209 private households in the municipality, and an average of 2.7 persons per household. There were 51 households that consist of only one person and 20 households with five or more people. In 2000, a total of 204 apartments (77.9% of the total) were permanently occupied, while 48 apartments (18.3%) were seasonally occupied and 10 apartments (3.8%) were empty. As of 2009, the construction rate of new housing units was 1.5 new units per 1000 residents. The vacancy rate for the municipality, in 2010, was 0.33%.

The historical population is given in the following chart:

== Heritage sites of national significance ==
The Gestelnburg is listed as a Swiss heritage site of national significance. The entire village of Niedergesteln is part of the Inventory of Swiss Heritage Sites.

== Politics ==
In the 2007 federal election the most popular party was the CVP which received 78.84% of the vote. The next three most popular parties were the SVP (8.99%), the SP (8.68%) and the FDP (1.37%). In the federal election, a total of 330 votes were cast, and the voter turnout was 65.5%.

In the 2009 Conseil d'État/Staatsrat election a total of 337 votes were cast, of which 13 or about 3.9% were invalid. The voter participation was 67.9%, which is much more than the cantonal average of 54.67%. In the 2007 Swiss Council of States election a total of 332 votes were cast, of which 11 or about 3.3% were invalid. The voter participation was 66.3%, which is much more than the cantonal average of 59.88%.

== Economy ==
As of 2010, Niedergesteln had an unemployment rate of 0.9%. As of 2008, there were 35 people employed in the primary economic sector and about 15 businesses involved in this sector. 29 people were employed in the secondary sector and there were 4 businesses in this sector. 56 people were employed in the tertiary sector, with 16 businesses in this sector. There were 302 residents of the municipality who were employed in some capacity, of which females made up 38.7% of the workforce.

In 2008 the total number of full-time equivalent jobs was 90. The number of jobs in the primary sector was 16, all of which were in agriculture. The number of jobs in the secondary sector was 29 of which 17 or (58.6%) were in manufacturing and 12 (41.4%) were in construction. The number of jobs in the tertiary sector was 45. In the tertiary sector; 11 or 24.4% were in wholesale or retail sales or the repair of motor vehicles, 17 or 37.8% were in the movement and storage of goods, 9 or 20.0% were in a hotel or restaurant, 2 or 4.4% were technical professionals or scientists, 4 or 8.9% were in education.

In 2000, there were 39 workers who commuted into the municipality and 257 workers who commuted away. The municipality is a net exporter of workers, with about 6.6 workers leaving the municipality for every one entering. About 10.3% of the workforce coming into Niedergesteln are coming from outside Switzerland. Of the working population, 20.5% used public transportation to get to work, and 67.2% used a private car.

== Religion ==
From the 2000 census, 535 or 93.4% were Roman Catholic, while 11 or 1.9% belonged to the Swiss Reformed Church. Of the rest of the population, there were 2 members of an Orthodox church (or about 0.35% of the population). There was 1 individual who was Islamic. 3 (or about 0.52% of the population) belonged to no church, are agnostic or atheist, and 21 individuals (or about 3.66% of the population) did not answer the question.

== Education ==
In Niedergesteln about 221 or (38.6%) of the population have completed non-mandatory upper secondary education, and 37 or (6.5%) have completed additional higher education (either university or a Fachhochschule). Of the 37 who completed tertiary schooling, 67.6% were Swiss men, 27.0% were Swiss women.

During the 2010-2011 school year there were a total of 48 students in the Niedergesteln school system. The education system in the Canton of Valais allows young children to attend two years of non-obligatory Kindergarten. During the school year 2011/12, there was one kindergarten class (KG1 and KG2) and 13 kindergarten students. The canton's school system requires students to attend six years of primary school. In Niedergesteln there were a total of 3 classes and 33 students in the primary school. The secondary school program consists of three lower, obligatory years of schooling (orientation classes), followed by three to five years of optional, advanced schools or vocational training. All the lower secondary students from Niedergesteln attend their school in a neighboring municipality Raron.

As of 2000, there were 27 students from Niedergesteln who attended schools outside the municipality.
