= Rock castle =

Type of medieval castle

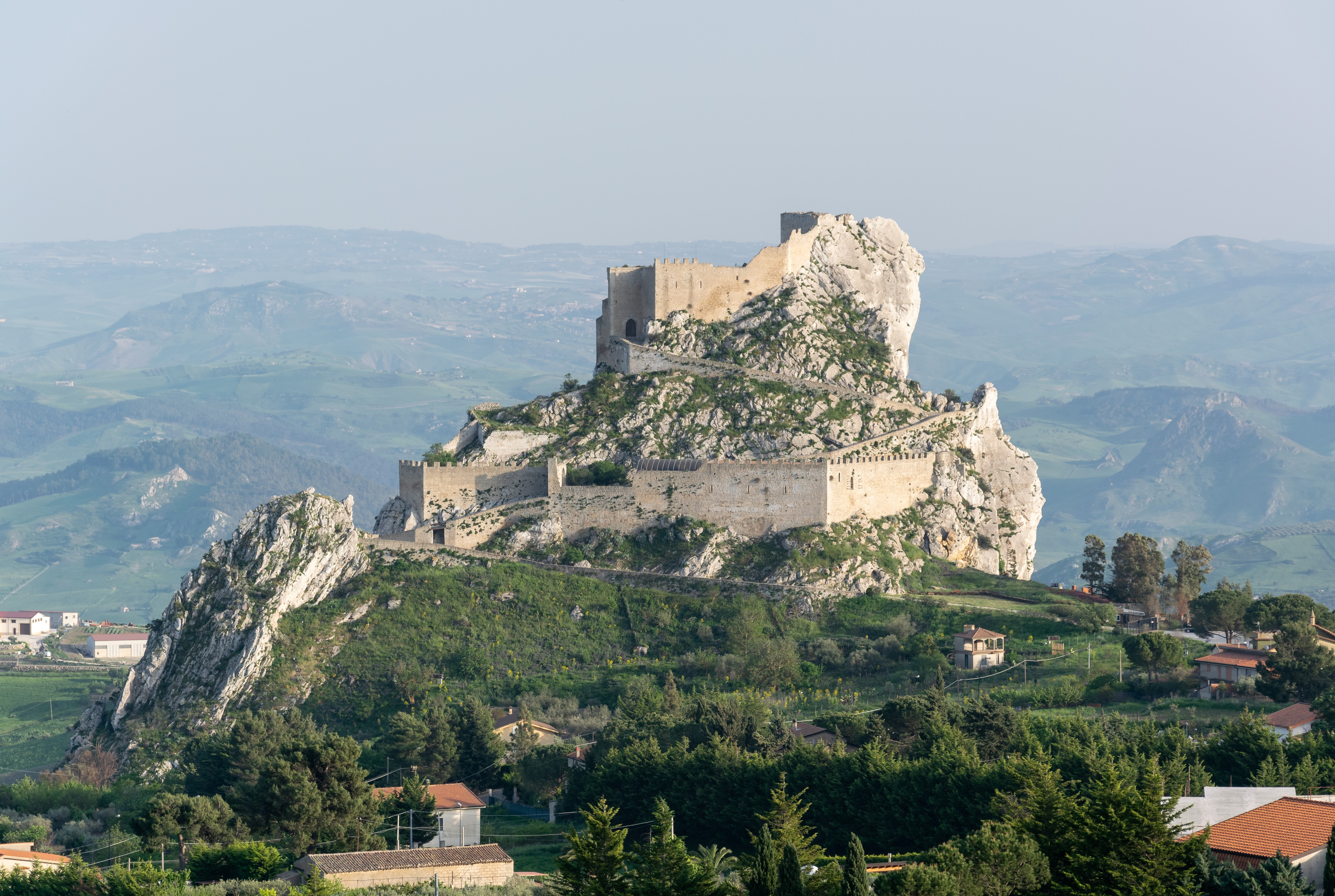
Castello di Mussomeli in Sicily

A rock castle (German: Felsenburg) is a type of medieval castle that directly incorporates natural rock outcrops into its defences to such an extent that the rock formations define the structure of the castle. Topographically, rock castles are classified as hill castles.

== Layout ==
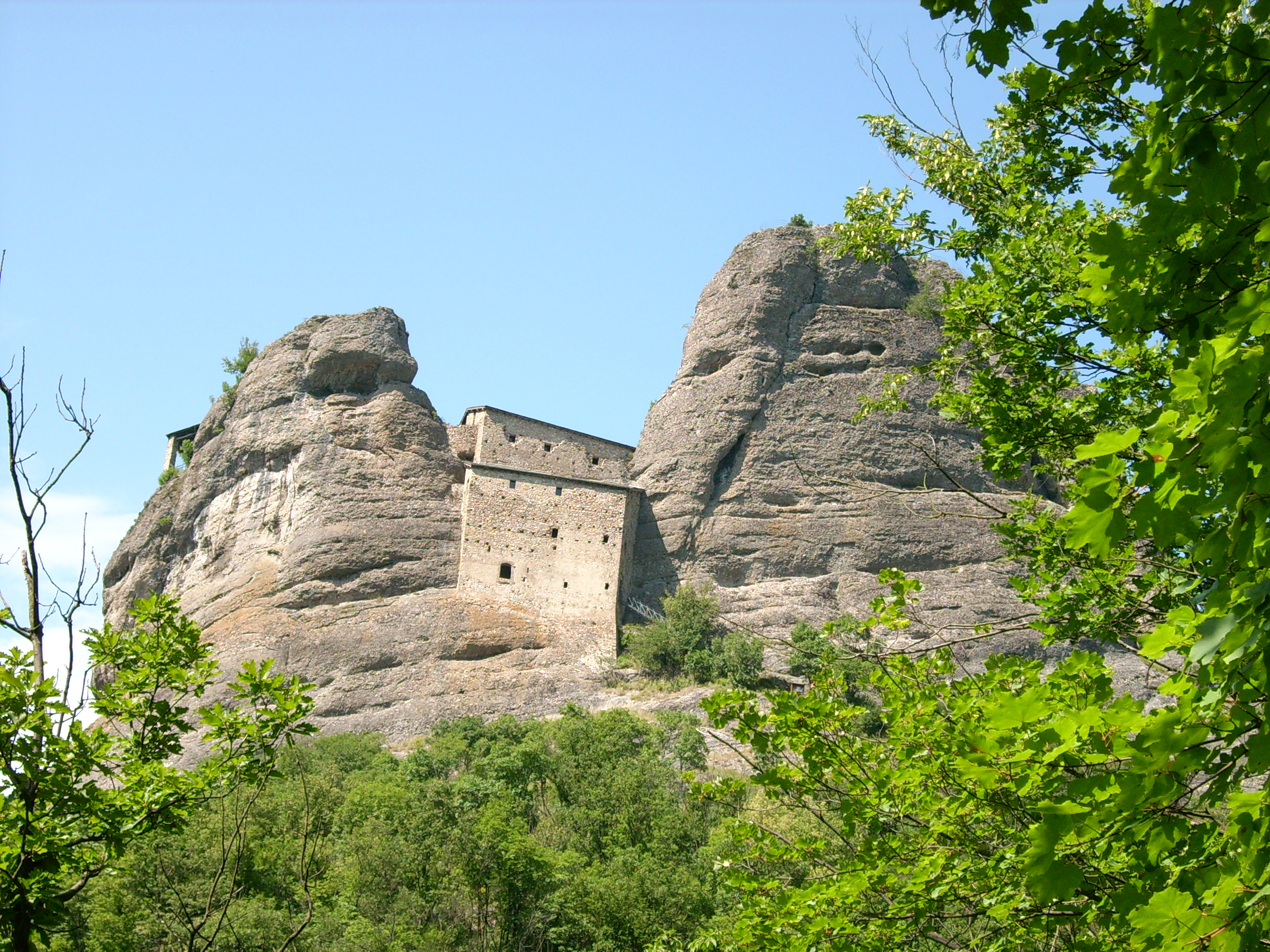
Castello della Pietra in Vobbia, Liguria

By contrast with the usual hill castles, that utilize the bedrock as a foundation for the individual buildings, the entire structure of rock castles is shaped by natural, often isolated rock formations, such as rock towers or crags. Typically a rock castle was built on a rock that was able to provide a fortified position without any great additions. In simple fortifications of this type the rock could be climbed on simple ladders that were hoisted up in times of danger. Rock castles would also have wooden and stone structures built on or against them. The morphological characteristics of the rock were crucial to the extent and nature of any structures.

The rock on which the castle stands is always incorporated into its design. If the rock is easy to work (e.g. sandstone), rooms, passages, steps, well shafts and cisterns were invariably hacked out of it. The buildings, made of wood or stone, stood on or next to the rock and used it as a foundation or walls. The remains of wooden structures are not usually preserved today, but their location and appearance can be partially gauged by the joist bearings and joist holes still visible in the rock.

Rock castles occur in large numbers in the southern Palatinate (Palatinate Forest), in northern Alsace (North Vosges) as well as in North Bohemia and Saxon Switzerland, where great sandstone rocks provide the necessary prerequisite for their construction.

Most rock castles no longer exist today. Often the site was slighted and then used by local residents as a stone quarry, so that apart from man-made alterations to the rocks themselves, only a few traces are still visible. However, several rock castles, like the ruins of Neuwindstein still have substantial wall remains. A few rock castles were rebuilt in more recent times, e. g. Berwartstein Castle at the end of the 19th century and the imperial castle of Trifels Castle, which was to have become a "site of national remembrance" (nationalen Weihestätte) during the Nazi era. In both cases it was not a reconstruction of the medieval fortification but a contemporary new design.

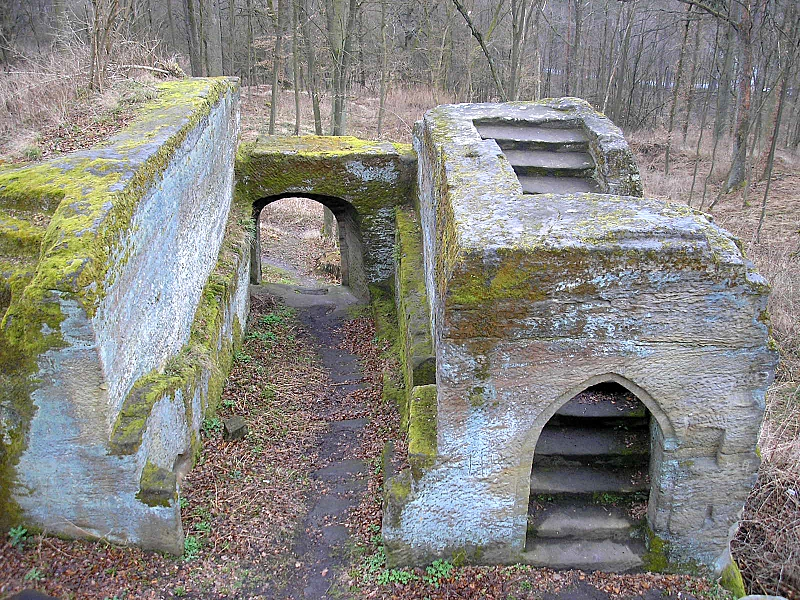
The gateway to Rotenhan Castle, which was entirely hewn out of the sandstone

== Rock-hewn castles ==
Castle researcher Otto Piper used the German phrase ausgehauene Burg (literally: "hewn-out castle") for castles that had rooms artificially hewn out of the rock on which the castle stood. His examples of such rock-hewn castles include Fleckenstein, Trifels and Altwindstein. From a constructional point of view there is a close relationship with cave castles, which are also often enhanced with rooms artificially cut out of the rock.

== False interpretations ==
The shapes carved out of the rock, such as foundation footings and putlock holes, are often wrongly interpreted by laymen as prehistoric or early history heathen cult sites. In some cases this has resulted in tourists being attracted, which in turn has caused considerable damage to these monuments. Foremost amongst these are Frankish castles in the Haßberge Hills, notably Lichtenstein Castle. The neighbouring castle of Rotenhan and others were inundated with visitors from throughout Europe. However, there is no archaeological evidence, as a rule, of pre-medieval use as site for cult rituals or sacrifices.

== List of important rock castles ==
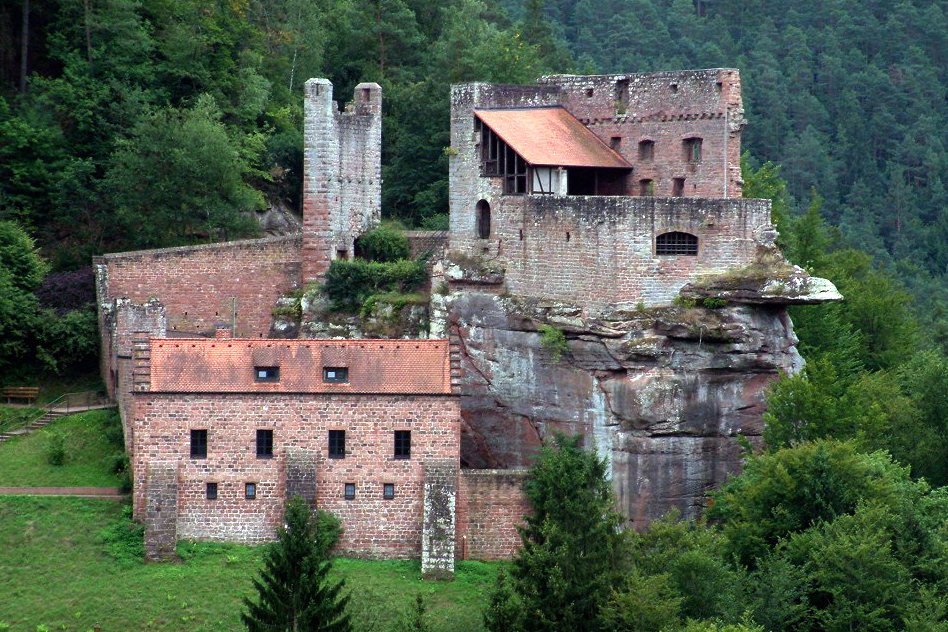
Spangenberg Castle (Palatinate Forest), with the upper ward on the rock and the lower ward in front of it

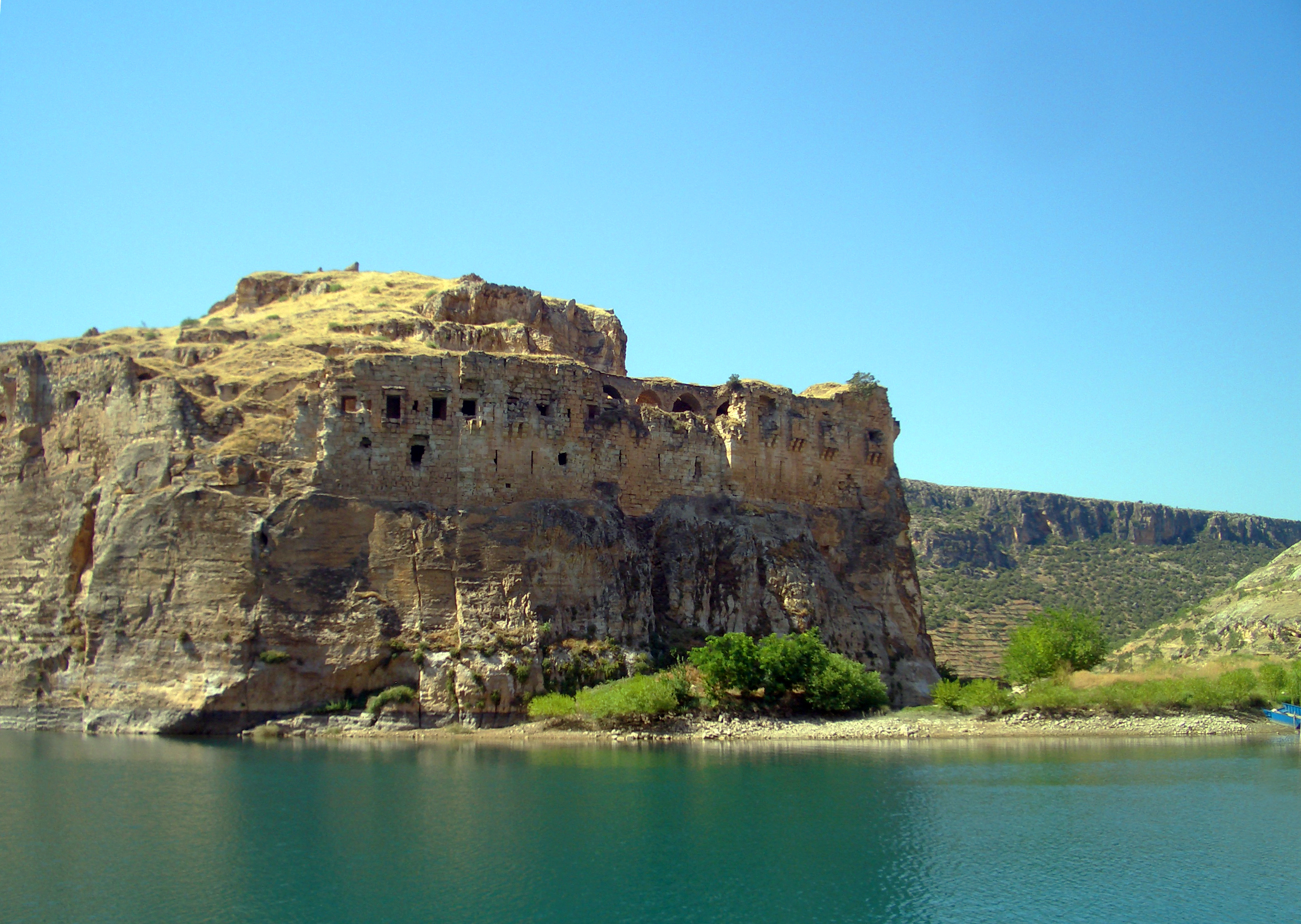
Rumkale in Şanlıurfa, Turkey

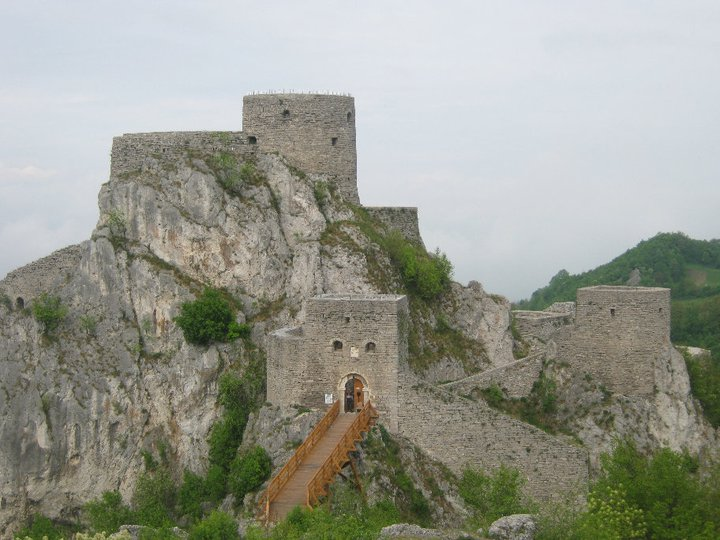
Srebrenik Fortress in Bosnia and Herzegovina

In Austria:

- Arbesbach Castle, Lower Austria
- Dürnstein Castle, Lower Austria

In Czechia:

- Castle Valečov, Český ráj, Central Bohemian Region, Bohemia
- Frýdštejn Castle, Český ráj, Liberec Region, Bohemia
- Helfenburk (Úštěk), Daubaer Switzerland Ústecký Region, Bohemia
- Rotštejn Castle, Český ráj, Liberec Region, Bohemia
- Šaunštejn Castle, Bohemian Switzerland, Ústecký Region, Bohemia
- Sloup Castle, Lusatian Mountains, Liberec Region, Bohemia
- Vranov Castle, Český ráj, South Moravian Region, Moravia

In France:

- Château de Fleckenstein, Vosges, Bas-Rhin, Alsace, Grand Est
- Château de Hohbarr, Vosges, Bas-Rhin-Alsace, Grand Est
- Château de Hohenbourg, Vosges, Bas-Rhin-Alsace, Grand Est

In Germany:

- Altdahn Castle, Palatinate Forest, Palatinate, Rhineland-Palatinate
- Berwartstein Castle, Palatinate Forest, Palatinate, Rhineland-Palatinate
- Grafendahn Castle, Palatinate Forest, Palatinate, Rhineland-Palatinate
- Königstein Fortress, Saxon Switzerland, Saxony
- Neurathen Castle, Saxon Switzerland, Saxony
- Scharzfels Castle, Harz, Lower Saxony
- Spangenberg Castle, Palatinate Forest, Palatinate, Rhineland-Palatinate
- Tanstein Castle, Palatinate Forest, Palatinate, Rhineland-Palatinate
- Trifels Castle, Palatinate Forest, Palatinate, Rhineland-Palatinate

In Iran:

- Alamut Castle, Alamut, Qazvin province
- Babak Fort, Arasbaran, Kaleybar County, East Azerbaijan province
- Saru castles, Qumis, Semnan County, Semnan province

In Italy:

- Castello di Mussomeli, Erean Mountains, Caltanissetta, Sicily
- Castello della Pietra, Ligurian Apennines, Genoa, Liguria

In Turkey:

- Rumkale, Gaziantep Province

== Literature ==
- Marco Bollheimer (2011), Felsenburgen im Burgenparadies Wasgau–Nordvogesen (in German) (3. ed.), Karlsruhe: Selbstverlag, ISBN 978-3-9814506-0-6
- Walter Herrmann: Auf rotem Fels. G. Braun Buchverlag Karlsruhe, ISBN 978-3-7650-8565-9
