= Château du Vieux-Windstein =

Ruined castle in Bas-Rhin, Grand Est, France

Coordinates: 48°59′53″N 7°40′51″E

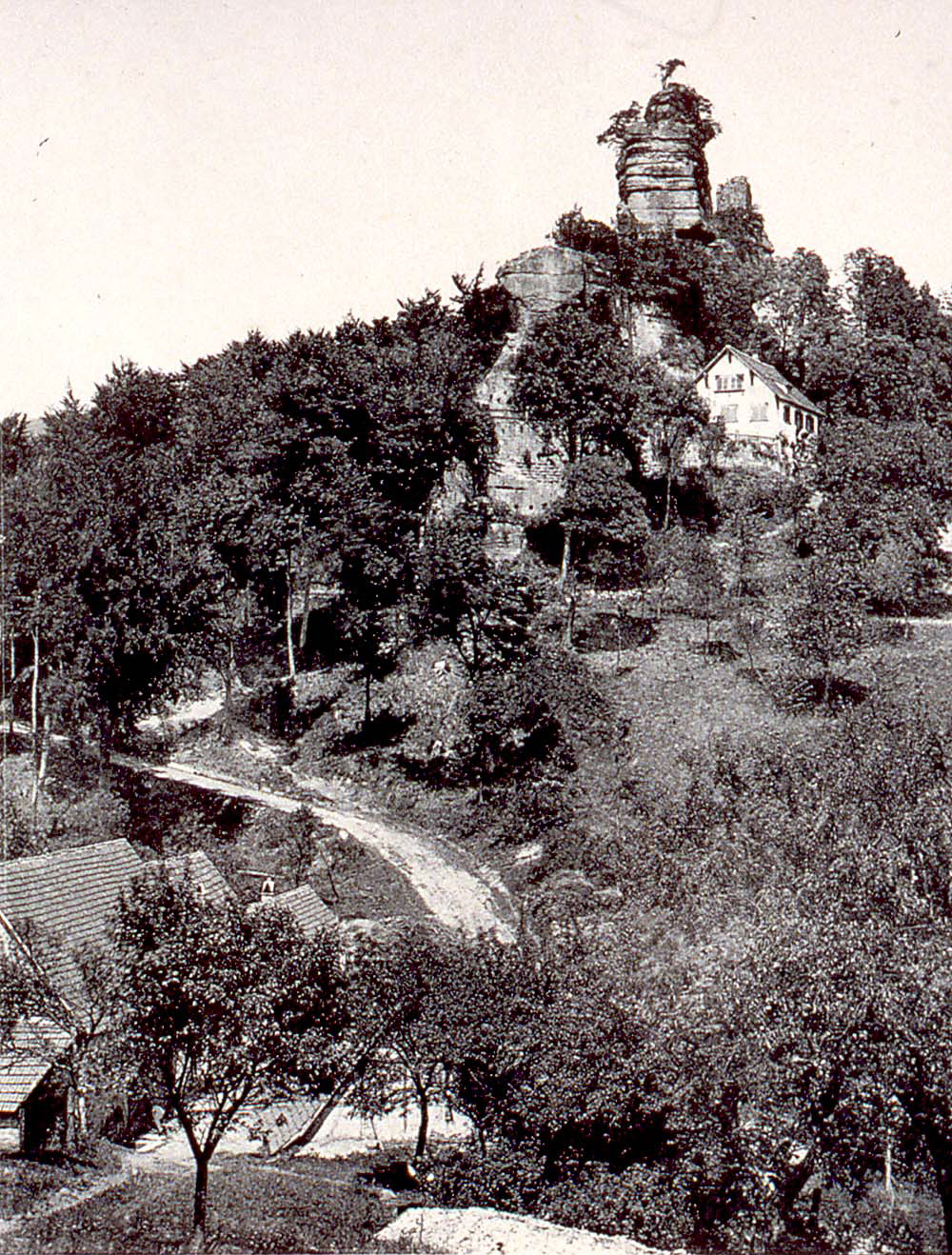
The Château du Vieux-Windstein, c. 1900

The Château du Vieux Windstein is a ruined castle in the commune of Windstein, in the Bas-Rhin département of France.

== History ==
The first documented mention of the Château de Windstein is dated 1205. It was built at the end of the 12th century by the Hohenstaufens to protect their imperial palace at Haguenau. The castle was a fief of the Empire, in the possession of the Windstein family, and was built in two periods, though dates are not known. Later, the castle was split in two with the lords of Sickingen and Schmalenstein each owning a part. Some buildings were constructed in the 13th century but it later became a haunt of brigands and was razed in 1332, following a conflict with the city of Strasbourg. Despite a ban on rebuilding, it was rebuilt again during the course of the 14th century. Burned in 1515, it passed into the possession of the Durkheims. The castle was finally ruined at the end of the 17th century, destroyed by the artillery of General Joseph de Montclar in 1676 during the wars against Louis XIV.

== Description ==
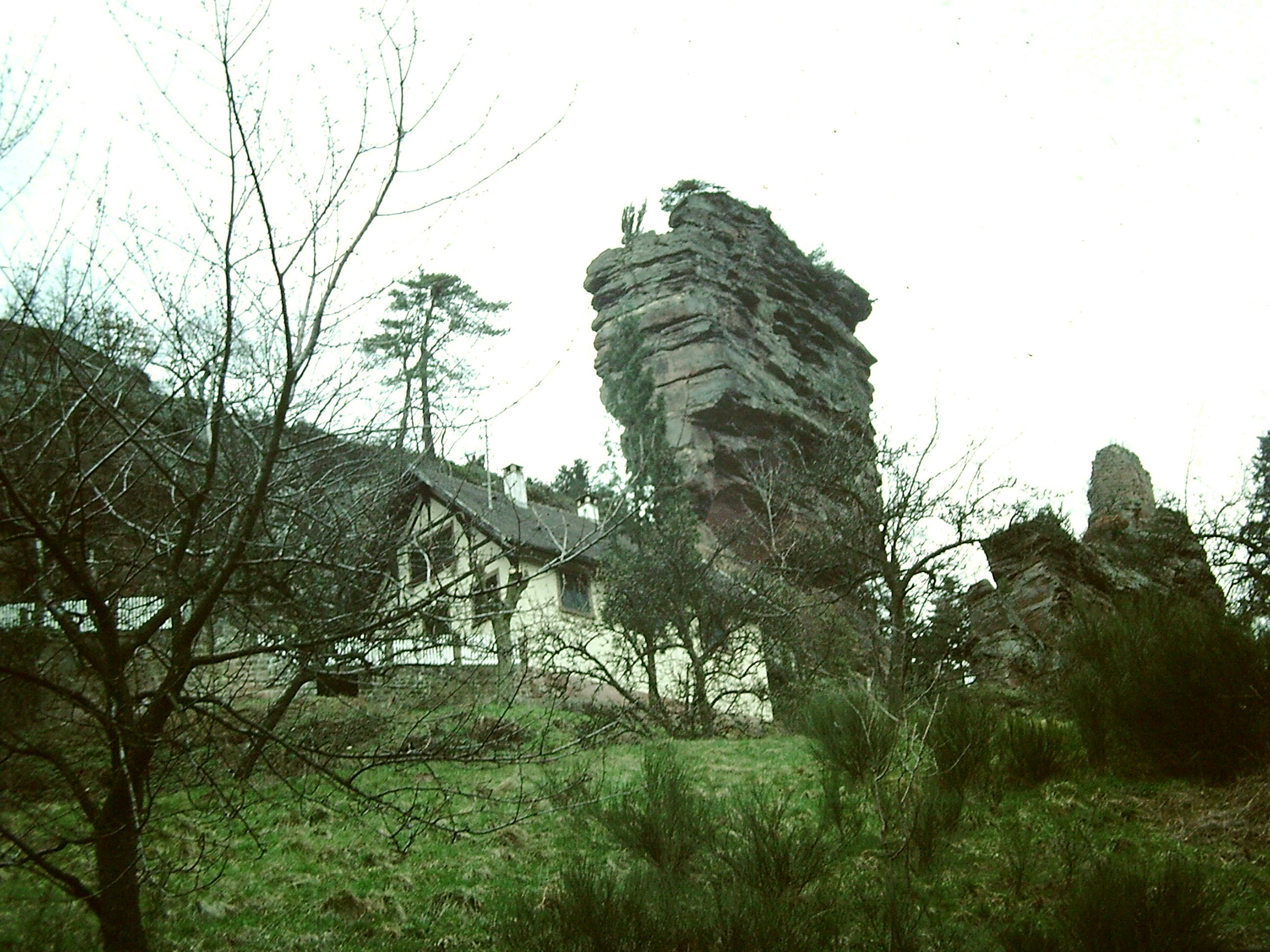
General view taken in 1986.

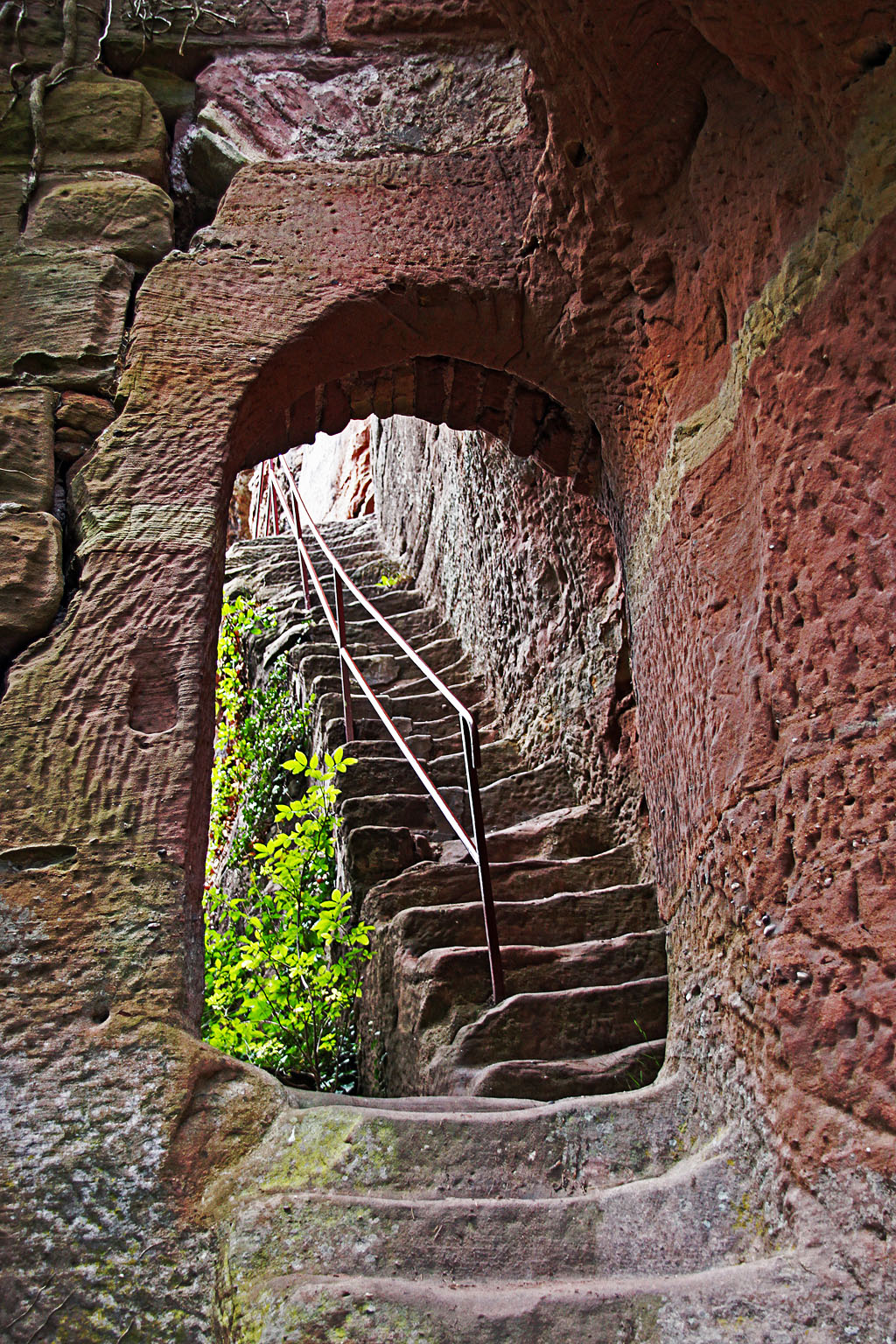
Old Windstein castle staircase

The castle is on top of a narrow sandstone outcrop and comprises two groups of buildings, separated by a ditch formed from an old fault enlarged when the castle was divided. There are a number of troglodytic (built into the rock) elements.

Access to the lower courtyard of the southern castle is by a stone staircase cut into the rock. A house has been built on the site of the common buildings. A platform has been laid out, halfway up the rock, preceded by cave rooms and a cistern. There is a 41 metres (~135 ft) deep well cut into the rock. The foundations of a Romanesque chapel are visible. On the summit, traces exist of a keep.

On the northern summit are remains of parts of a wall (late 13th, early 14th century), the only remnants of a keep built against the south castle. This part also has vestiges of a large habitable tower, as well as parts of a manor house (13th/14th centuries).

The Château du Vieux Windstein has been listed since 1984 as a monument historique by the French Ministry of Culture.

== See also ==
- List of castles in France
