= Windstein =

- Commune
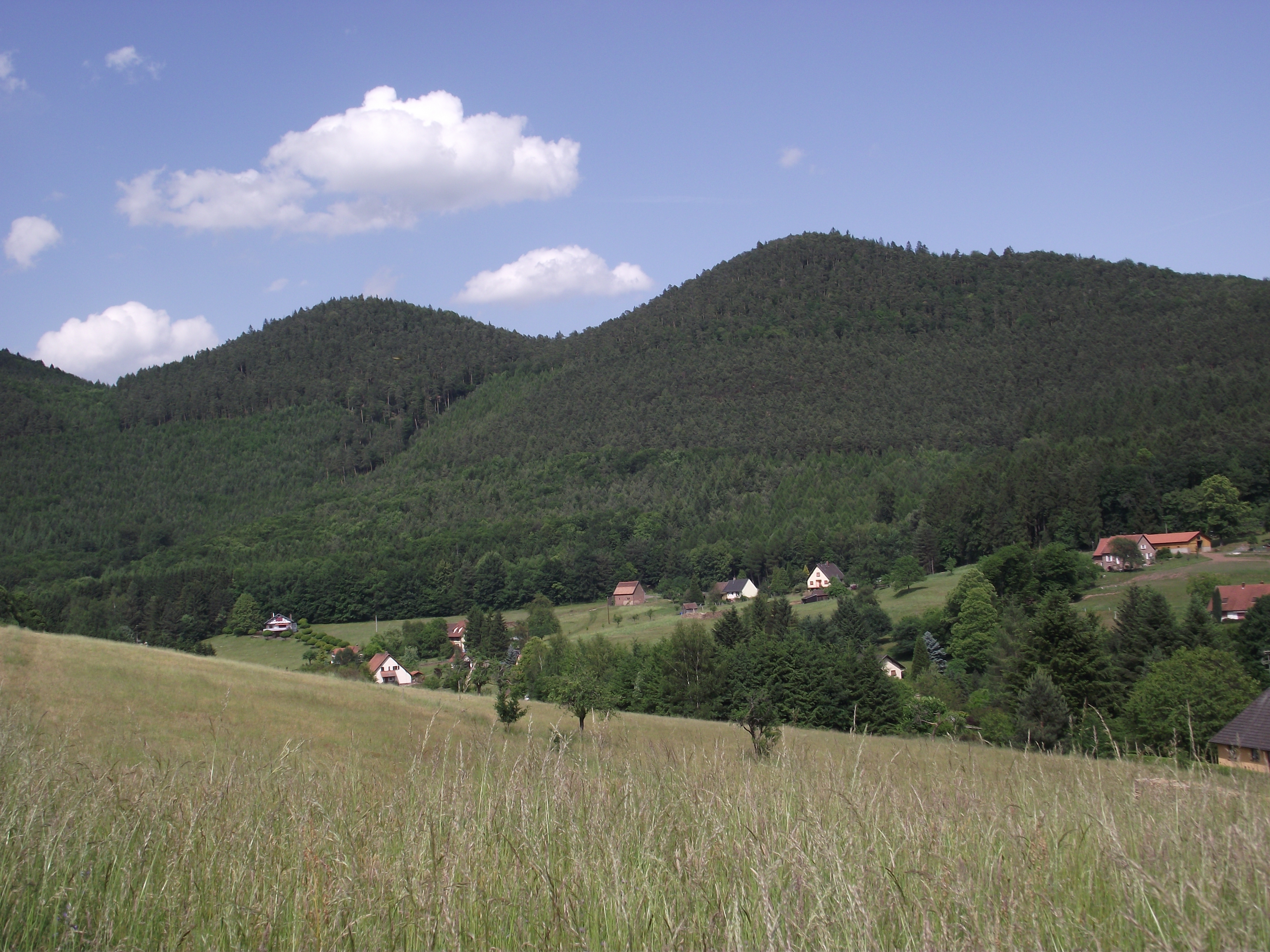
- Vosges mountains Mittelkopf (left) and Steinkopf (right) in Windstein

- Coat of arms
- Location of Windstein
- Location within France Location within Grand Est
- Coordinates: 48°59′42″N 7°41′05″E
- Country: France
- Region: Grand Est
- Department: Bas-Rhin
- Arrondissement: Haguenau-Wissembourg
- Canton: Reichshoffen
- Intercommunality: Pays de Niederbronn-les-Bains

Government
  - Mayor (2020–2026): Steeve Omphalius
- Area^{1}: 11.97 km^{2} (4.62 sq mi)
- Highest elevation: 517 m (1,696 ft)
- Lowest elevation: 195 m (640 ft)
- Population (2023): 177
  - Density: 14.8/km^{2} (38.3/sq mi)
- Time zone: UTC+01:00 (CET)
  - Summer (DST): UTC+02:00 (CEST)
- INSEE/Postal code: 67536 /67110
- ^{1} French Land Register data, which excludes lakes, ponds, glaciers > 1 km^{2} (0.386 sq mi or 247 acres) and river estuaries.

Windstein is a commune in the Bas-Rhin department in Grand Est in north-eastern France.

== Population ==
Historical population
Year	Pop.	±% p.a.
1968	191	—
1975	201	+0.73%
1982	185	−1.18%
1990	166	−1.35%
1999	174	+0.52%
2007	161	−0.97%
2012	174	+1.57%
2017	164	−1.18%
2023	177	+1.28%
Source: INSEE

== See also ==
- Communes of the Bas-Rhin department
