= Azzo of Gobatsburg =

Austrian nobleman

Azzo of Gobatsburg is considered the progenitor of the house of Kuenring. He died around 1100. The first mention of him comes around 1059. The nickname "of Gobatsburg" only first appears in 1074.

A legend often told goes that Azzo had come to the aid of Leopold II, Margrave of Austria against the Bohemians and won a grand victory against them. And it was because of his deeds that the Kuenrings were considered the Marshals of Austria. This story, however, is unlikely and only came about when the Kuenrings had become highly influential.

== Issue ==
- Anselm of Gobatsburg
- Nizzo of Krems-Gars married Truta
- Albero I of Kuenring
