= Dürnstein =

- Municipality
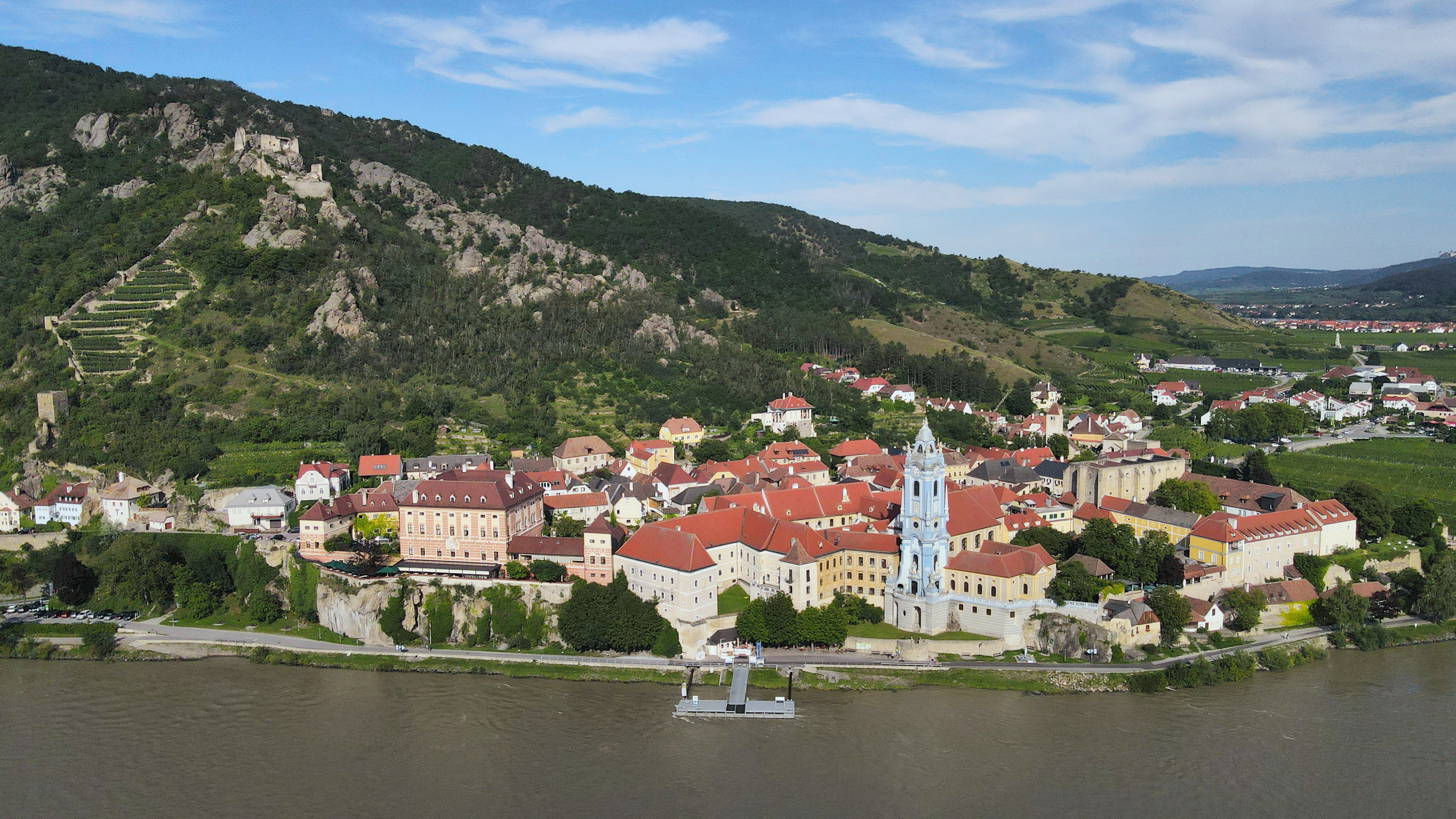
- Dürnstein

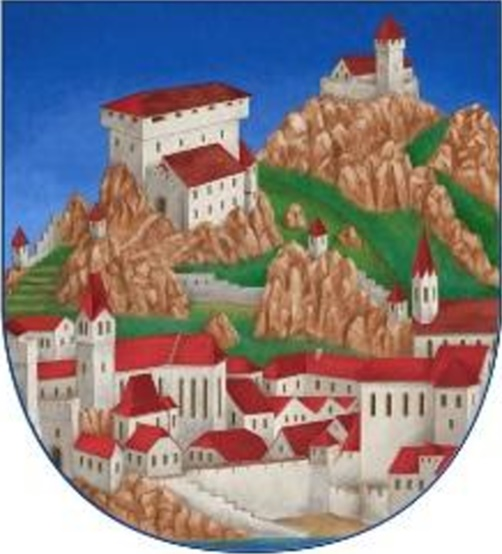
- Coat of arms

- Location within Austria
- Coordinates: 48°23′44″N 15°31′13″E
- Country: Austria
- State: Lower Austria
- District: Krems-Land

Government
  - Mayor: Johann Riesenhuber (ÖVP)

Area
  - Total: 16.82 km^{2} (6.49 sq mi)
- Elevation: 209 m (686 ft)

Population (2018-01-01)
  - Total: 864
  - Density: 51.4/km^{2} (133/sq mi)
- Time zone: UTC+1 (CET)
  - Summer (DST): UTC+2 (CEST)
- Postal code: 3601
- Area code: 02711
- Vehicle registration: KR
- Website: www.duernstein.at

Dürnstein (German pronunciation: [ˈdʏʁnˌʃtaɪ̯n]) is a small town on the Danube river in the Krems-Land district, in the Austrian state of Lower Austria. It is one of the most-visited tourist destinations in the Wachau region and also a well-known wine growing area. The municipality consists of the Katastralgemeinden of Dürnstein, Oberloiben, and Unterloiben.

== Etymology ==
The town gained its name from the medieval Dürnstein castle, which overlooked it. The castle's name derived from the German duerr/dürr, meaning "dry", and Stein, "stone". The stone castle was dry because it was located on a rocky hill, high above the damp conditions of the Danube at the base of the hill. The modern town stands between the castle and the river.

== History ==
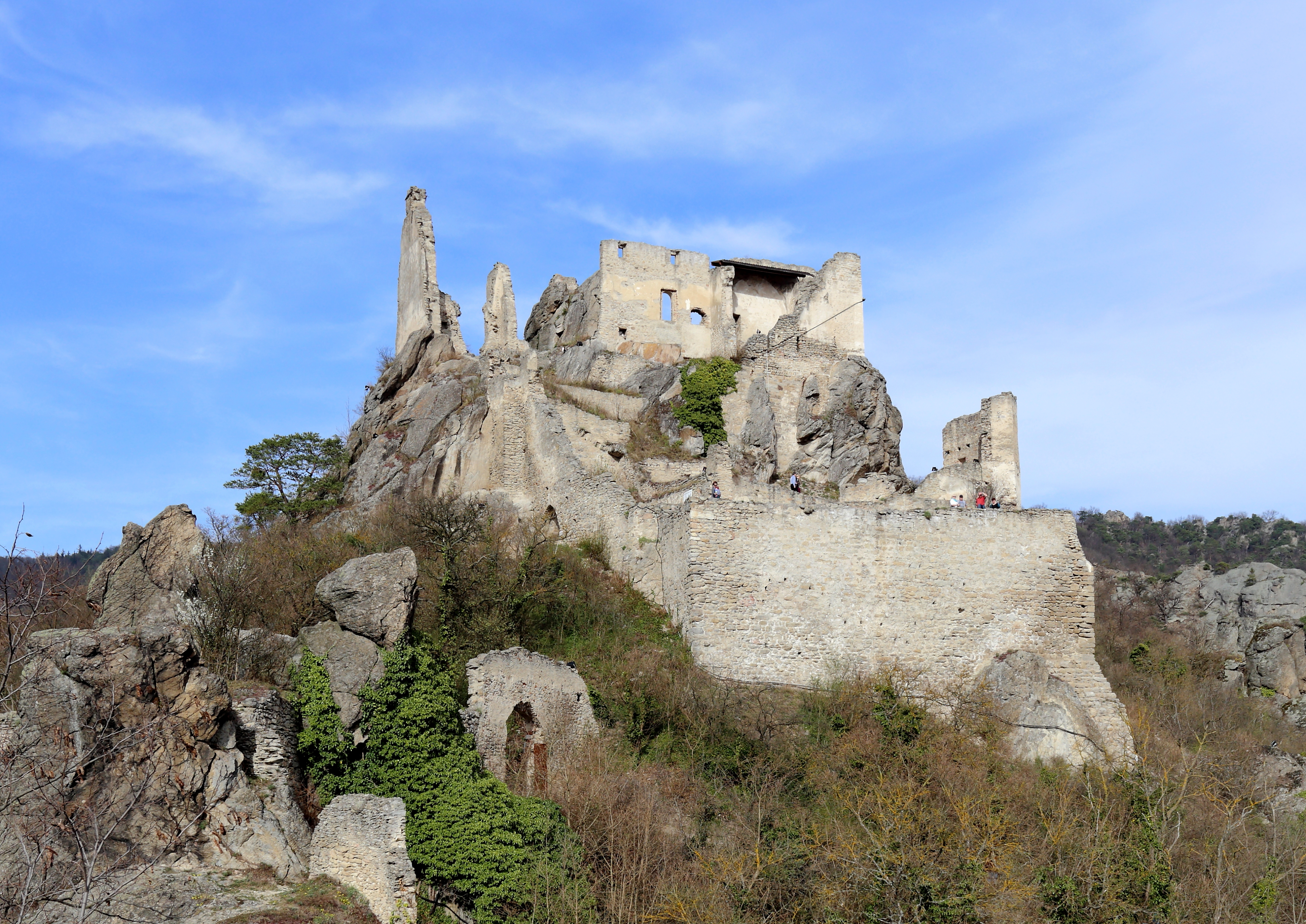
Dürnstein Castle

Dürnstein was first mentioned in 1192 when, in the castle above the town, King Richard I of England was held captive by Leopold V, Duke of Austria, after their dispute during the Third Crusade. Richard the Lionheart had offended Leopold the Virtuous by casting down his standard from the walls at the Battle of Acre, and the duke suspected that King Richard ordered the murder of his cousin Conrad of Montferrat in Jerusalem. In consequence Pope Celestine III excommunicated Leopold for capturing a fellow crusader. The duke finally gave custody of the king to Henry VI, Holy Roman Emperor, who imprisoned Richard at Trifels Castle.

Dürnstein Castle was almost completely destroyed by the troops of the Swedish Empire under Field Marshal Lennart Torstenson in 1645.

Dürnstein Abbey (Stift Dürnstein) was established in 1410 by Canons Regular from Třeboň and from 1710 rebuilt in a Baroque style according to plans by Joseph Munggenast, Jakob Prandtauer and Matthias Steinl. The monastery was dissolved by order of Emperor Joseph II in 1788 and fell to the Herzogenburg Priory. It is famous for its blue tower, which is clearly visible from the river.

During the War of the Third Coalition the Battle of Dürenstein was fought nearby on 11 November 1805.

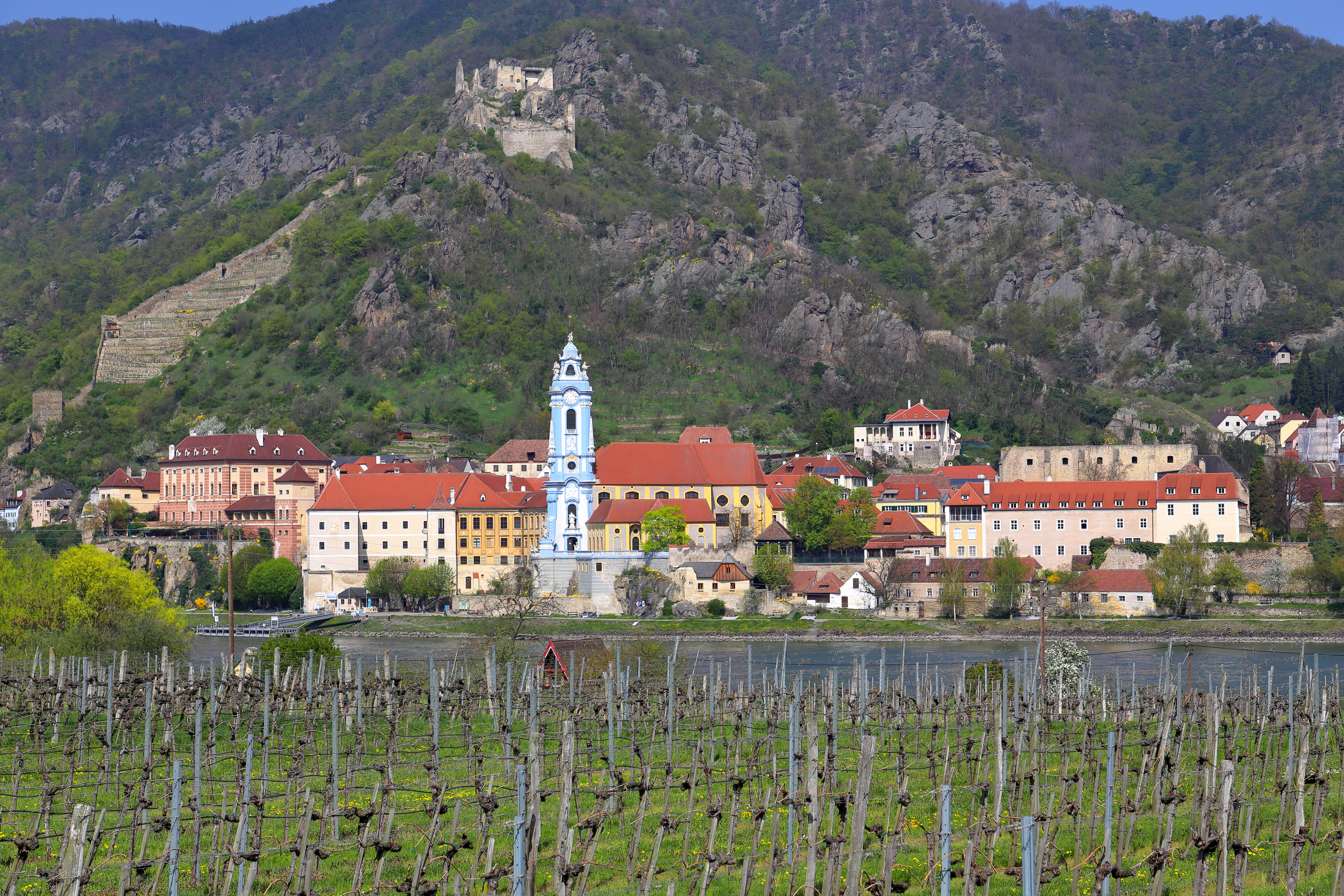
View of the town with the castle seen on top of the hill

== Politics ==
Seats in the municipal assembly as of 2020 elections:

- Austrian People's Party: 10
- Social Democratic Party of Austria: 3
- Freedom Party of Austria: 2

== International relations ==
Dürnstein is twinned with:

- Tegernsee, Germany
