= Burgschleinitz-Kühnring =

Town in Lower Austria, Austria

- Municipality
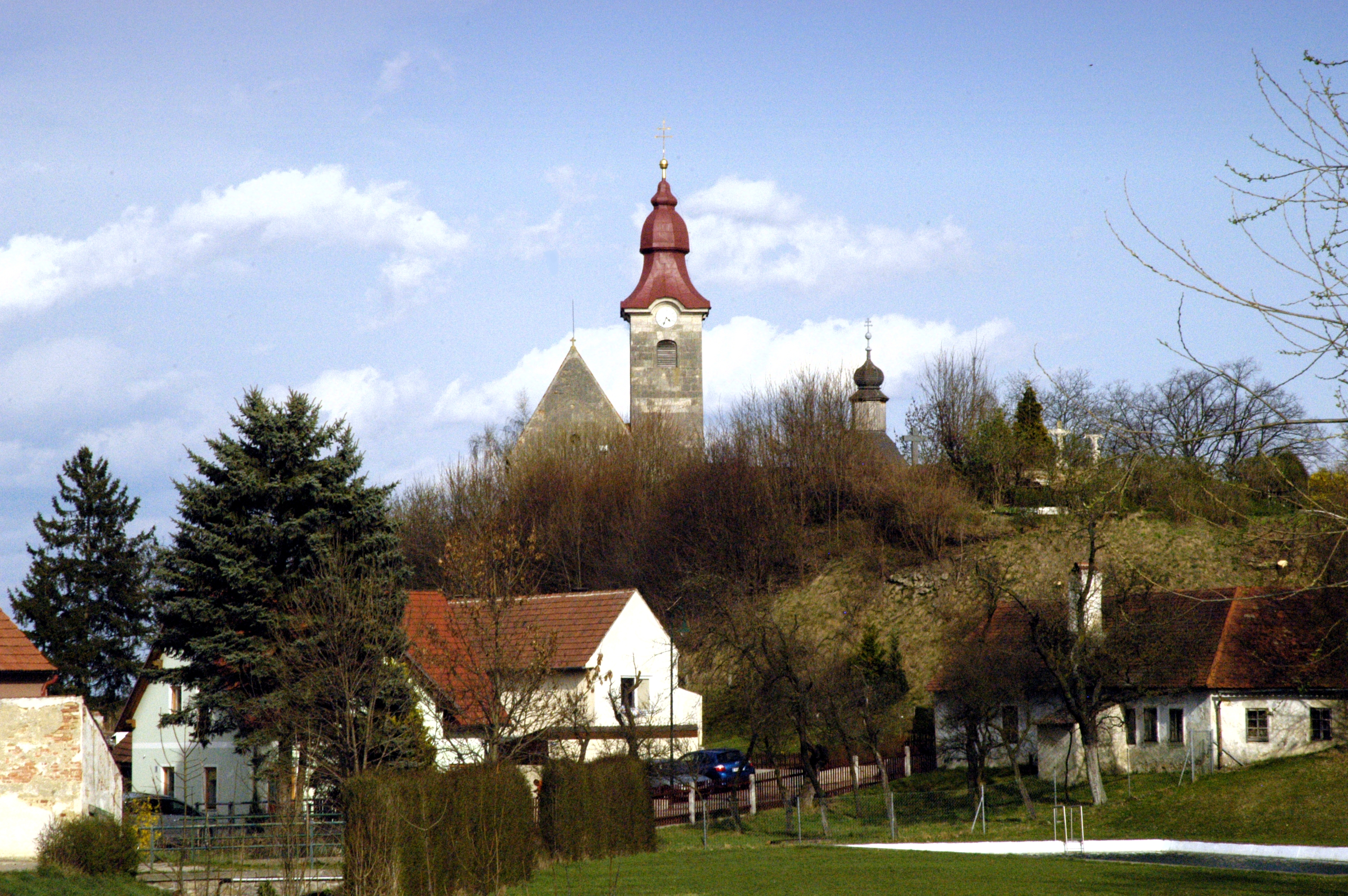
- Kühnring parish church

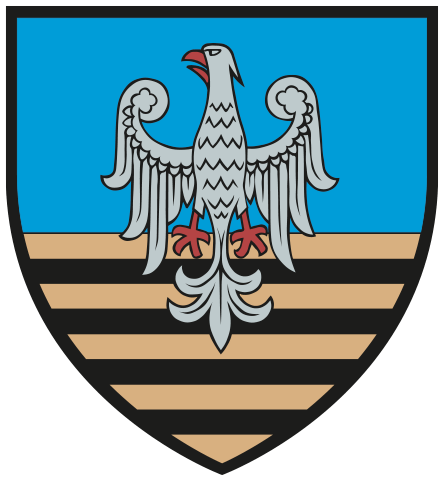
- Coat of arms

- Location within Austria
- Coordinates: 48°36′N 15°49′E
- Country: Austria
- State: Lower Austria
- District: Horn

Government
  - Mayor: Leopold Winkelhofer (ÖVP)

Area
  - Total: 41.86 km^{2} (16.16 sq mi)
- Elevation: 376 m (1,234 ft)

Population (2018-01-01)
  - Total: 1,360
  - Density: 32.5/km^{2} (84.1/sq mi)
- Time zone: UTC+1 (CET)
  - Summer (DST): UTC+2 (CEST)
- Postal code: 3730, 3713
- Area code: 02984
- Website: www.burgschleinitz-kuehnring.at

Burgschleinitz-Kühnring is a market town in the district of Horn in Lower Austria, Austria.

== Geography ==
The municipal area is part of the historic Waldviertel region, stretching along extended forests on the northeastern rim of the Manhartsberg ridge. It comprises the cadastral communities of Amelsdorf, Burgschleinitz, Buttendorf, Geiersdorf, Harmannsdorf, Kühnring, Matzelsdorf, Reinprechtspölla, Sachsendorf, Sonndorf, and Zogelsdorf.

== History ==
About 1130, Hadmar I of Kuenring, a ministerialis in the service of the Babenberg margrave Leopold III of Austria had a fortress erected at the site of the present-day Kühnring parish church. According to tradition, his ancestors had already erected a chapel here, which was consecrated by Bishop Altmann of Passau in 1083.

In 1612, a Baroque castle was erected in the nearby village of Harmannsdorf, which became known as the residence of Nobel laureate Bertha von Suttner (1843–1914). There she wrote large parts of her novel Die Waffen nieder! (Lay Down Your Arms!), published in 1889.

== Population ==
Historical population
Year	Pop.	±%
1923	1,922	—
1951	1,800	−6.3%
1961	1,574	−12.6%
1971	1,463	−7.1%
1981	1,338	−8.5%
1991	1,313	−1.9%
2001	1,419	+8.1%
2009	1,362	−4.0%
2014	1,330	−2.3%
2018	1,382	+3.9%
2025	1,382	+0.0%

== Politics ==
Seats in the municipal council (Gemeinderat) as of 2015 local elections:

- Austrian People's Party (ÖVP): 15
- Social Democratic Party of Austria (SPÖ): 2
- The Greens – The Green Alternative: 2

== Notable people ==
- Otto Zykan (1935–2006), composer, died in Sachsendorf
