= History of Austria =

The history of Austria covers the history of Austria and its predecessor states. In the late Iron Age Austria was occupied by people of the Hallstatt Celtic culture (c. 800 BC), they first organized as a Celtic kingdom referred to by the Romans as Noricum, dating from c. 800 to 400 BC. At the end of the 1st century BC, the lands south of the Danube became part of the Roman Empire. In the Migration Period, the 6th century, the Bavarii, a Germanic people, occupied these lands until they fell to the Frankish Empire established by the Germanic Franks in the 9th century. In the year 976 AD, the first state of Austria formed. The name Ostarrîchi (Austria) has been in use since 996 AD when it was a margravate of the Duchy of Bavaria and from 1156 an independent duchy (later archduchy) of the Holy Roman Empire (962–1806).

Austria was dominated by the House of Habsburg and House of Habsburg-Lorraine from 1273 to 1918. In 1806, when Emperor Francis II of Austria dissolved the Holy Roman Empire, Austria became the Austrian Empire, and was also part of the German Confederation until the Austro-Prussian War of 1866. In 1867, Austria formed a dual monarchy with Hungary: the Austro-Hungarian Empire. When this empire collapsed after the end of World War I in 1918, Austria was reduced to the main, mostly German-speaking areas of the empire (its current frontiers), and adopted the name, the Republic of German-Austria. However, union with Germany and the chosen country name were forbidden by the Allies at the Treaty of Versailles. This led to the creation of the First Austrian Republic (1919–1933).

Following the First Republic, Kurt Schuschnigg and the Fatherland Front tried to keep Austria independent from the German Reich. Engelbert Dollfuss accepted that most Austrians were German and Austrian, but wanted Austria to remain independent from Germany. In 1938, Austrian-born Adolf Hitler annexed Austria to Germany, which was supported by a large majority of Austrians. After the German defeat in World War II, the German identity in Austria was weakened. Ten years after the Second World War Austria again became an independent republic as the Second Austrian Republic in 1955. Austria joined the European Union in 1995.

== Historiography ==
Since the territory understood by the term 'Austria' underwent drastic changes over time, dealing with a History of Austria raises a number of questions, e.g., whether it is confined to the current or former Republic of Austria, or extends also to all lands formerly ruled by the rulers of Austria. Furthermore, should Austrian history include the period 1938–1945, when it nominally did not exist? Of the lands now part of the second Republic of Austria, many were added over time – only two of the nine provinces (Lower and Upper Austria) are strictly 'Austria', while other parts of its former sovereign territory are now part of other countries e.g., Italy, Croatia, Slovenia and the Czech Republic. Within Austria there are regionally and temporally varying affinities to adjacent countries.

== Prehistory ==
=== Paleolithic ===
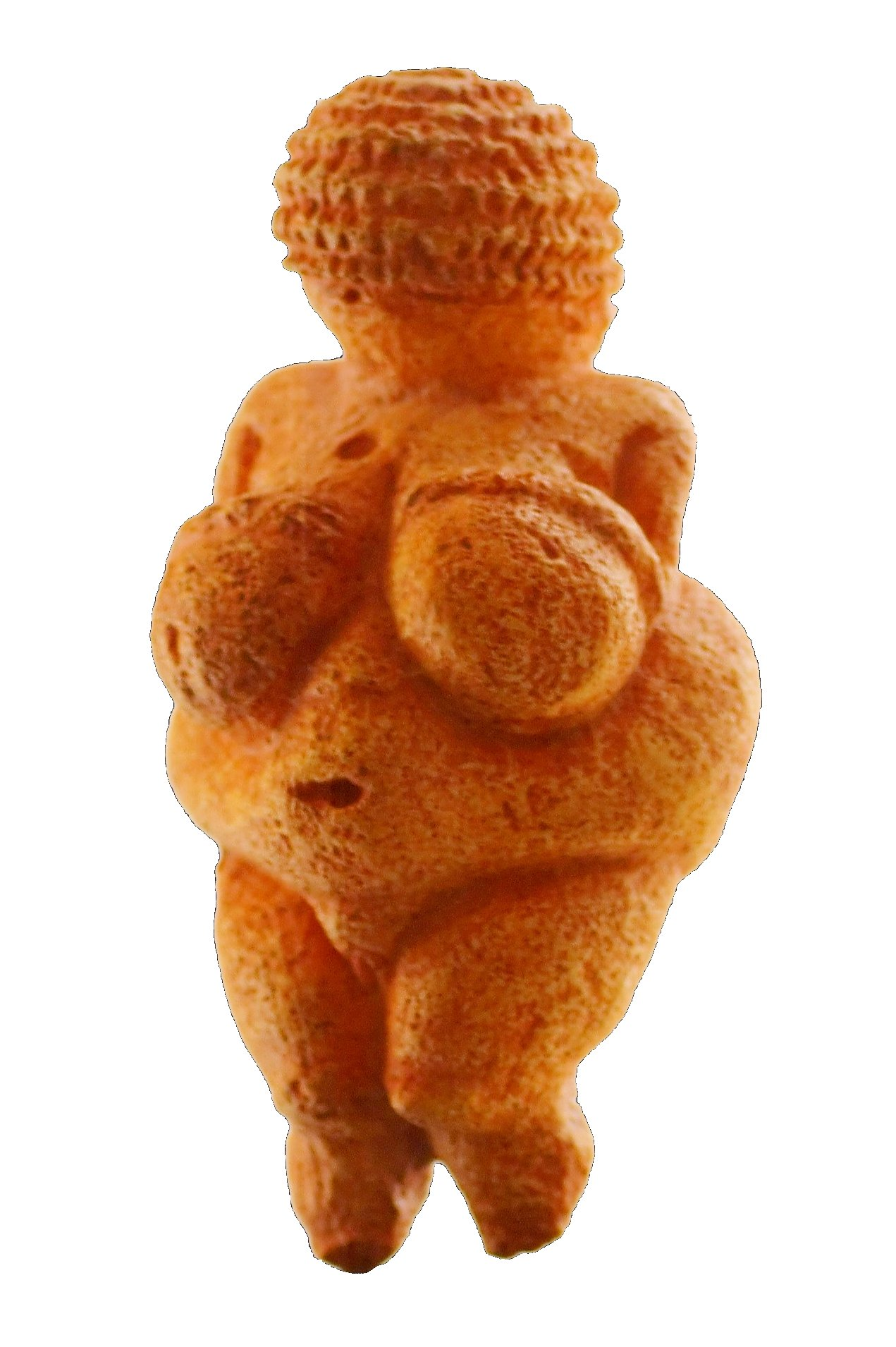
The Venus of Willendorf, c. 25,000 BC. Naturhistorisches Museum, Vienna.

The Alps were inaccessible during the Ice Age, so human habitation dates no earlier than the Middle Paleolithic era, during the time of the Neanderthals. The oldest traces of human habitation in Austria, more than 250,000 years ago, were found in the Repolust Cave at Badl, near Peggau in the Graz-Umgebung district of Styria. These include stone tools, bone tools, and pottery fragments together with mammalian remains. Some 70,000-year-old evidence was found in the Gudenus Cave in northwestern Lower Austria.

Upper Paleolithic remains are more numerous in Lower Austria. The best known are in the Wachau region, including the sites of the two oldest pieces of art in Austria. These are figurative representations of women, the Venus of Galgenberg found near Stratzing and thought to be 32,000 years old, and the nearby Venus of Willendorf (26,000 years old) found at Willendorf, near Krems an der Donau. In 2005 in the same area, a double infant burial site was discovered at Krems-Wachtberg, dating from Gravettian culture (27,000 years old), the oldest burial ground found in Austria to date.

=== Mesolithic ===
Mesolithic remains include rock shelters (abris) from Lake Constance and the Alpine Rhine Valley, a funeral site at Elsbethen and a few other sites with microlithic artifacts which demonstrate the transition from living as hunter-gatherers and sedentary farmers and ranchers.

=== Neolithic ===
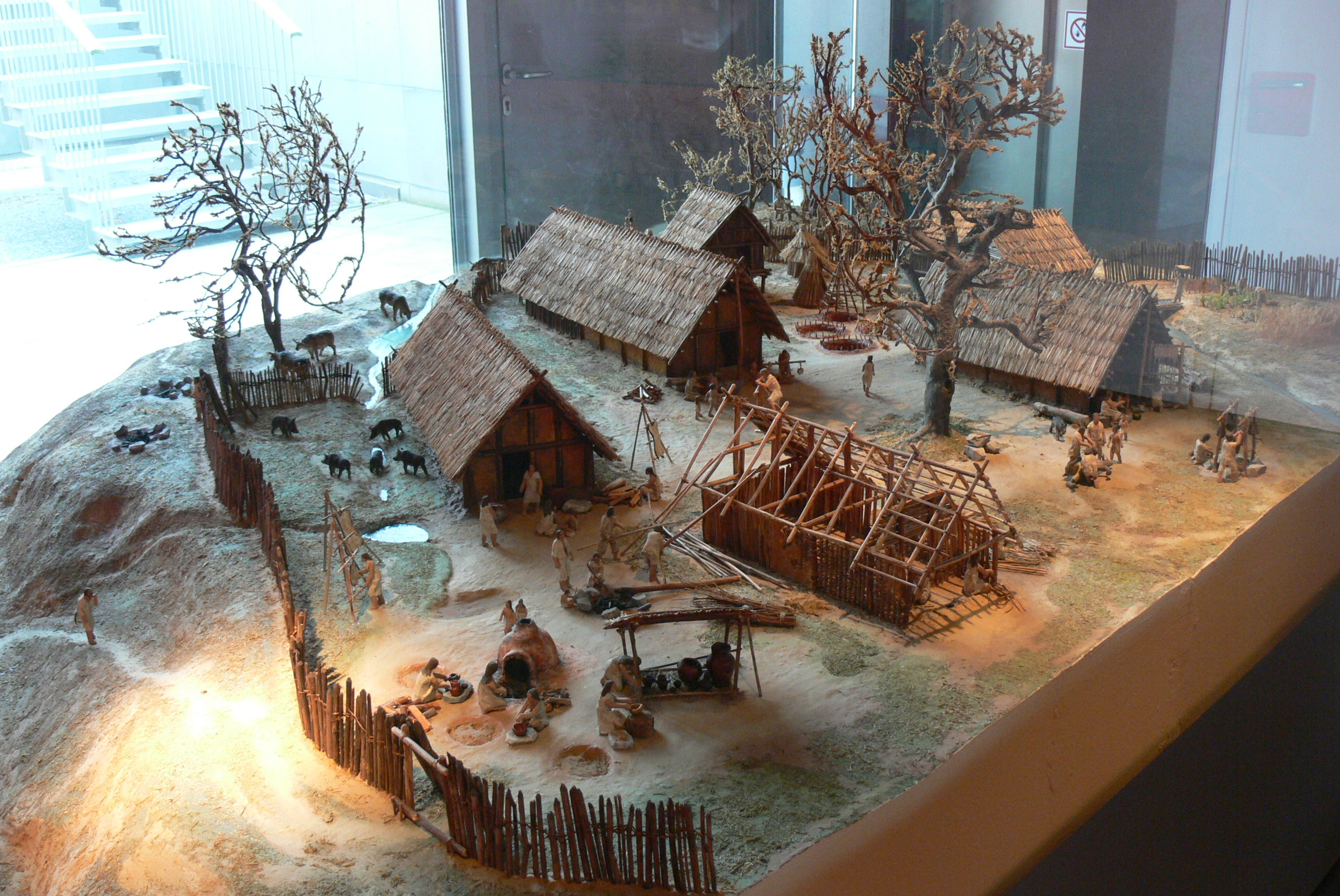
Model of the Neolithic settlement in Wels, Upper Austria

During the Neolithic era, most of those areas of Austria that were amenable to agriculture and were sources of raw materials were settled. Remains include those of the Linear pottery culture, one of the first agrarian cultures in Europe. The first recorded rural settlement from this time was at Brunn am Gebirge in Mödling. Austria's first industrial monument, the chert mine at Mauer-Antonshöhe in the Mauer neighborhood of the southern Vienna district of Liesing dates from this period. In the Lengyel culture, which followed Linear Pottery in Lower Austria, circular ditches were constructed.

=== Copper Age ===
Traces of the Copper Age in Austria were identified in the Carpathian Basin hoard at Stollhof, Hohe Wand, Lower Austria. Hilltop settlements from this era are common in eastern Austria. During this time the inhabitants sought out and developed raw materials in the central Alpine areas. The most important find is considered to be the Iceman Ötzi, a well-preserved mummy of a man frozen in the Alps dating from approximately 3,300 BC, although these finds are now in Italy on the Austrian border. Another culture is the Mondsee group, represented by stilt houses in the Alpine lakes.

=== Bronze Age ===
By the beginning of the Bronze Age fortifications were appearing, protecting the commercial centers of the mining, processing, and trading of copper and tin. This flourishing culture is reflected in the grave artifacts, such as at Pitten, in Nußdorf ob der Traisen, Lower Austria. In the late Bronze Age appeared the Urnfield culture, in which salt mining commenced in the northern salt mines at Hallstatt.

== Iron Age ==
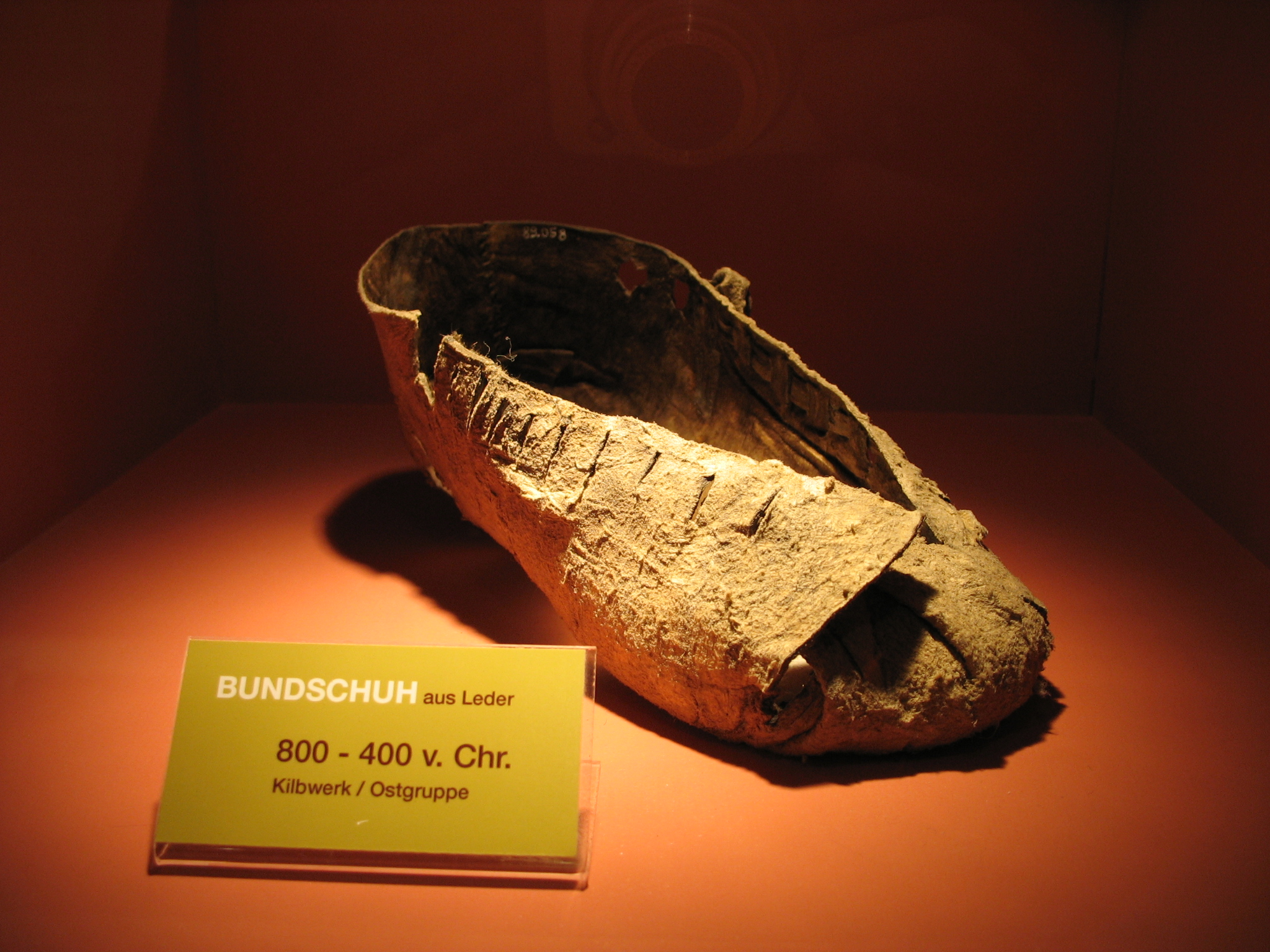
Leather shoe from the Hallstatt culture, 800–400 B. C.

The Iron Age in Austria is represented by the Hallstatt culture, which succeeded the Urnfield culture, under influences from the Mediterranean civilizations and Steppe peoples. This gradually transitioned into the Celtic La Tène culture.

=== Hallstatt culture ===
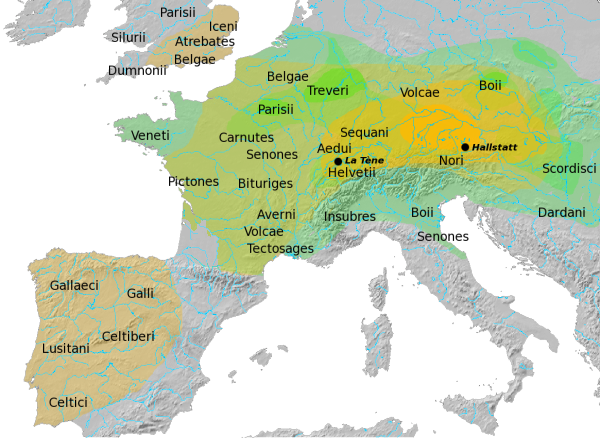
Hallstatt (800 BC: solid yellow; 500 BC: light yellow) and La Tène (450 BC: solid green; 50 BC light green)

This early Iron Age culture is named after Hallstatt the type site in Upper Austria. The culture is often described in two zones, Western and Eastern, through which flowed the rivers Enns, Ybbs and Inn. The West Hallstatt area was in contact with the Greek colonies on the Ligurian coast. In the Alps, contacts with the Etruscans and under Greek influence regions in Italy were maintained. The East had close links with the Steppe Peoples who had passed over the Carpathian Basin from the southern Russian steppes.

The population of Hallstatt drew its wealth from the salt industry. Imports of luxury goods stretching from the North and Baltic seas to Africa have been discovered in the cemetery at Hallstatt. The oldest evidence of an Austrian wine industry was discovered in Zagersdorf, Burgenland in a grave mound. The Cult Wagon of Strettweg, Styria is evidence of contemporary religious life.

=== La Tène (Celtic) culture ===
In the later Iron Age, the Celtic La Tène culture spread to Austria. This culture gave rise to the first-recorded local tribal (Taurisci, Ambidravi, Ambisontes) and place names. Out of this arose Noricum (2nd century to c. 15 b.c.) – a confederation of Alpine Celtic tribes (traditionally twelve) under the leadership of the Norici. It was confined to present-day southern and eastern Austria and part of Slovenia. The West was settled by the Raeti.

Dürrnberg and Hallein (Salzburg) were Celtic salt settlements. In eastern Styria and the Burgenland (e.g., Oberpullendorf) high-quality iron ore was mined and processed, then exported to the Romans as ferrum noricum (Noric iron). This led to the creation of a Roman trading outpost on the Magdalensberg in the early 1st century b.c., later replaced by the Roman town Virunum. Fortified hilltop settlements, e.g. Kulm (east Styria), Idunum (mod. Villach), Burg (Schwarzenbach), and Braunsberg (Hainburg), were centers of public life. Some cities, such as Linz, date back to this period also.

== Roman era ==
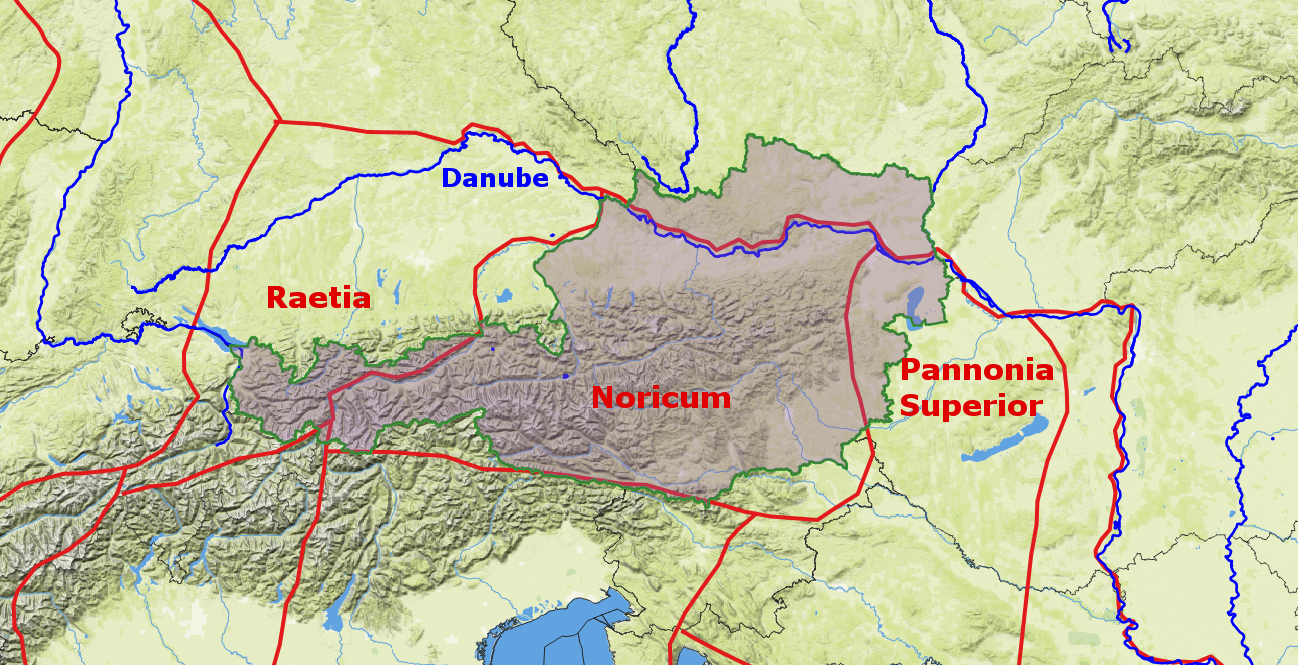
Roman provinces in the region of modern Austria

During the Roman Empire, the territory of present-day Austria corresponded roughly with the Roman province of Noricum which was annexed by the empire around 15 BC, beginning 500 years of "Austria Romana" (as it became known in the 19th century). The western and eastern extremities of present-day Austria were within the Roman provinces of Raetia, and Pannonia. Austria north of the Danube was outside the empire and inhabited by a powerful cluster of Germanic peoples, including the Naristi, Marcomanni and Quadi, who had a close relationship with the Roman empire, disrupted occasionally by major conflicts.

During Emperor Claudius's reign (41–54 AD), Noricum was bounded on the east approximately by the Vienna Woods, the current eastern border of Styria, and parts of the Danube, Eisack, Drava rivers. Under Diocletian (284–305), Noricum was divided along the main Alpine ridge into a northern and southern part (Noricum ripense and Noricum Mediterraneum). Across the Ziller in the west, corresponding approximately to the present provinces of Vorarlberg and Tyrol, lay the province of Raetia. Present day Burgenland in the east was in Pannonia. To the south was Region 10, Venetia et Histria.

The Romans built many Austrian cities that survive today. They include Vindobona (Vienna), Juvavum (Salzburg), Valdidena (Innsbruck), and Brigantium (Bregenz). Other important towns were Virunum (north of the modern Klagenfurt), Teurnia (near Spittal), and Lauriacum (Enns). Archaeological sites from the Roman period include Kleinklein (Styria) and Zollfeld (Magdalensberg). Christianity appeared in Roman Austria in the 2nd century, prompting Church organization that can be traced back to the 4th century.

The Marcomanni and their allies fought Rome in a devastating round of conflicts in the late second century, the so-called Marcomannic Wars. Although the Marcomanni even managed to invade Italy itself, they were eventually defeated and forced to accept a much weakened position. By 300 AD many or perhaps most of them were moved south of the Danube, into the empire. The Rugii and Heruli may have already moved into the Marcomanni's traditional region north of the Danube in the third or fourth century. The Laterculus Veronensis shows that Heruli and Rugii were already present somewhere near the empire in western Europe in about 314. Similar listings from later in the 4th century, the Cosmographia of Julius Honorius, and probably also the Liber Generationis, both listed the Heruli together with the Marcomanni and their western neighbours, the Quadi.

In 378 AD, Roman forces suffered a major defeat at the Battle of Adrianople, caused by a sudden movement of peoples coming from the east, most notably Goths, Alans and Huns. In Pannonia, on the east of Austria, the Romans were forced to try new approaches to settling newcomers in large numbers. One of the most important armed groups at Adrianople, led by Alatheus and Saphrax, was allowed to settle there, and expected to do military service for Rome, and stop raiding further west. In practice the region east of Austria was no longer under full Roman control.

== Middle ages ==
=== End of Roman presence ===
As the Roman Empire's control over the Austrian border region crumbled, the ability of Raetia, Noricum, and especially Pannonia to defend themselves became increasingly problematic. A Gothic leader Radagaisus overran part of the country in 405.

After several raids on Italy, the Visigoths of Alaric I arrived in Noricum in 408. As described by Zosimus, Alaric set out from Emona (modern Ljubljana), which lay between Pannonia Superior and Noricum over the Carnic Alps, arriving at Virunum in Noricum, as had been agreed to by the Roman general Stilicho following several skirmishes between the two. At Stilicho's instigation, the Roman Senate voted to pay a large amount of money to Alaric to maintain peace. Conflict continued, with Alaric demanding Noricum and other territory, and even sacking Rome in 410. He died on the route home that year.

During this period, in 409, Saint Jerome wrote a letter mentioning that many of the peoples from around what is now eastern Austria, even from within the empire, had moved west and were occupying Gaul at that time: "Quadi, Vandals, Sarmatians, Alans, Gepids, Herules, Saxons, Burgundians, Alemanni and—alas! for the commonweal!—even Pannonians".

In 427 the chronicle of Marcellinus Comes says that the provinces of Pannonia, "which had been held by the Huns for fifty years, were reclaimed by the Romans." In about 430 the Roman general Aëtius fought in the region first against the Juthungi, and then against rebels in Noricum. He then also defeated Vindelici, the inhabitants of the northern part of Roman Raetia. There was a short period of stability around 431. However, in 433 Aëtius effectively ceded Pannonia to Attila and his Huns.

In 451 the Huns and their allies must have poured through Noricum and Raetia on their way to Gaul, where they were defeated by Aëtius and his allies at the Battle of the Catalaunian Plains that year. Attila died a few years later in 453, and this was followed by the Battle of Nedao in 454, when the sons of Attila and their Ostrogothic allies were defeated by other warlords still in the region. The victors were able to consolidate independent kingdoms north and east of the Middle Danube. In the north of present-day Austria, where the Marcomanni had been, were the Rugii and Heruli. South of the Danube there was still a significant Roman population, as described in the biography of Severinus of Noricum by Eugippius.

In 468 the Ostrogoths won the Battle of Bolia, giving them a stronger position over the Danubian kingdoms in and near the Pannonian region in the east of Austria. Among the worst defeated, the Sciri -- led by Edeco, who had formerly been an important leader under Attila -- lost control of their territory and many joined the Roman military in Italy. Hunimund, ruler of a Suevian kingdom in this region, moved west and formed a confederation with the Alemanni in an Alpine region with the Baiuvarii to their east. This is one of the first mentions of the early Bavarians.

In 476 Odoacer, the son of Edeco, became ruler of Roman Italy using barbarian forces including Heruli, Scirii, Rugii, and other peoples from the Austrian region. Eugippius describes remnants of Roman military organization surviving south of the Danube in Noricum, though the country was largely under Rugian control. He notes raids from Hunimund, the Allemani, Thuringians, and Heruli (but not yet the Bavarians) impacting settlements near Passau. An alliance between the Rugii, Ostrogoths, and Eastern Emperor Zeno caused Odoacer and his forces to invade in 487 and bring Feletheus and Gisa, king and queen of the Rugii, back to Italy, where they were executed. When Feletheus and Gisa's son Frideric returned to the area the following year, Odoacer's army attacked again, defeating Frideric and evacuating the Roman population from Noricum.. Frideric and his remaining Rugii moved to join the Ostrogoths, while the Langobards entered the Rugian region from the north. By 491, north of the Danube, the Heruli defeated the Lombards, obliging them to pay tribute, becoming the dominant force in the Austrian region for a short time.

=== Franks, Avars and Slavs (5th-7th centuries) ===
In 493 Theoderic the Great, the Ostrogothic king who already controlled Pannonia, took control of Italy (with forces that included many Rugii) and killed Odoacer. Like Odoacer, Theoderic was a Romanized leader whose father had been a warlord under Attila. To their north, by 500 the remaining Herulian kingdom on the Danube, led by King Rodulf, became allies of Theoderic. At some point during the period 493-511, the Heruli King Rodulf was killed in battle against the Lombards, who took the Heruli territory to the east of Austria, while the Heruli divided into smaller groups and moved to several other regions. Theoderic the Great maintained influence over the Austrian region until his death in 526, leaving power to his daughter Amalasuintha.

In 527 Justinian I became Roman emperor in Constantinople and in 535, after the murder of Amalasuintha, he began his long series of wars against the weakened Gothic kingdom in Italy. In the Austrian region, Frankish power expanded and the Merovingian king Theuderic I took control of nearby Thuringia in 531. When his son Theudebert I took the throne in 534, he became first an ally of Justinian in Italy, then, subsequently, a competitor for power. Theudebert claimed in a letter to Justinian that he controlled the area from the North Sea to Pannonia, thus including most of present-day Austria.

After the death of Theudebert in 548 and his son and successor Theudebald in 555; Theudebert's uncle Chlothar I took possession of their realm and established the land of the Bavarians in the northern Alps as an eastern Frankish Stem Duchy. The lands that were occupied by the Bavarians came to extend south to what is now South Tyrol, and east to the Enns river. The administrative center was at Regensburg. The Bavarians mixed with the Rhaeto-Romanic population and pushed into the mountains along the Puster Valley.

While Bavaria and the west of Austria remained under Frankish influence, the Lombards in about 540 took control of Pannonia -- in present-day Hungary and easternmost Austria -- bringing them into conflict with the Gepids to their east. Justinian eventually took the side of the Lombards, and the Gepids were defeated in 551. In the 560s, Avars migrating from central Asia began settling in Pannonia, finally destroying the Gepid kingdom entirely in 567. In 568 the Lombards, having recruited many forces from the Danubian region, moved into northern Italy. The Avars and their vassal Slavs subsequently dominated the Pannonian area.

In the south of modern Austria, Slavs also settled in the valleys of the Drava, Mura and Save by 600. The westward Slavic migration stopped further Bavarian expansion eastwards by 610. Their most westward expansion was reached in 650 at the Puster Valley, but gradually fell back to the Enns by 780. The boundary between Slavs and Bavarians roughly corresponds to a line from Freistadt through Linz, Salzburg (Lungau), to East Tyrol (Lesachtal), with Avars and Slavs occupying eastern Austria and modern Bohemia. The realm of Carantania (later Carinthia), which covered much of eastern and central Austrian territory, was the first independent Slavic state in Europe, centered at Zollfeld. Together with the indigenous population they were able to resist further encroachment of the neighboring Franks and Avars in the southeastern Alps.

=== Duchy of Bavaria (8th–10th centuries) ===
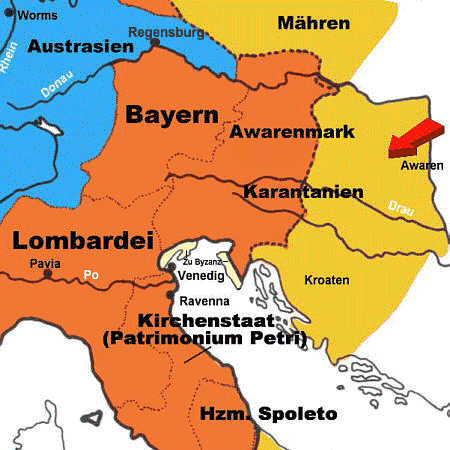
Avar March in eastern Bavaria between the Danube and Drava rivers Frankish Austrasia in 774 Lombard and Bavarian territories incorporated by Charlemagne in 788 Dependencies

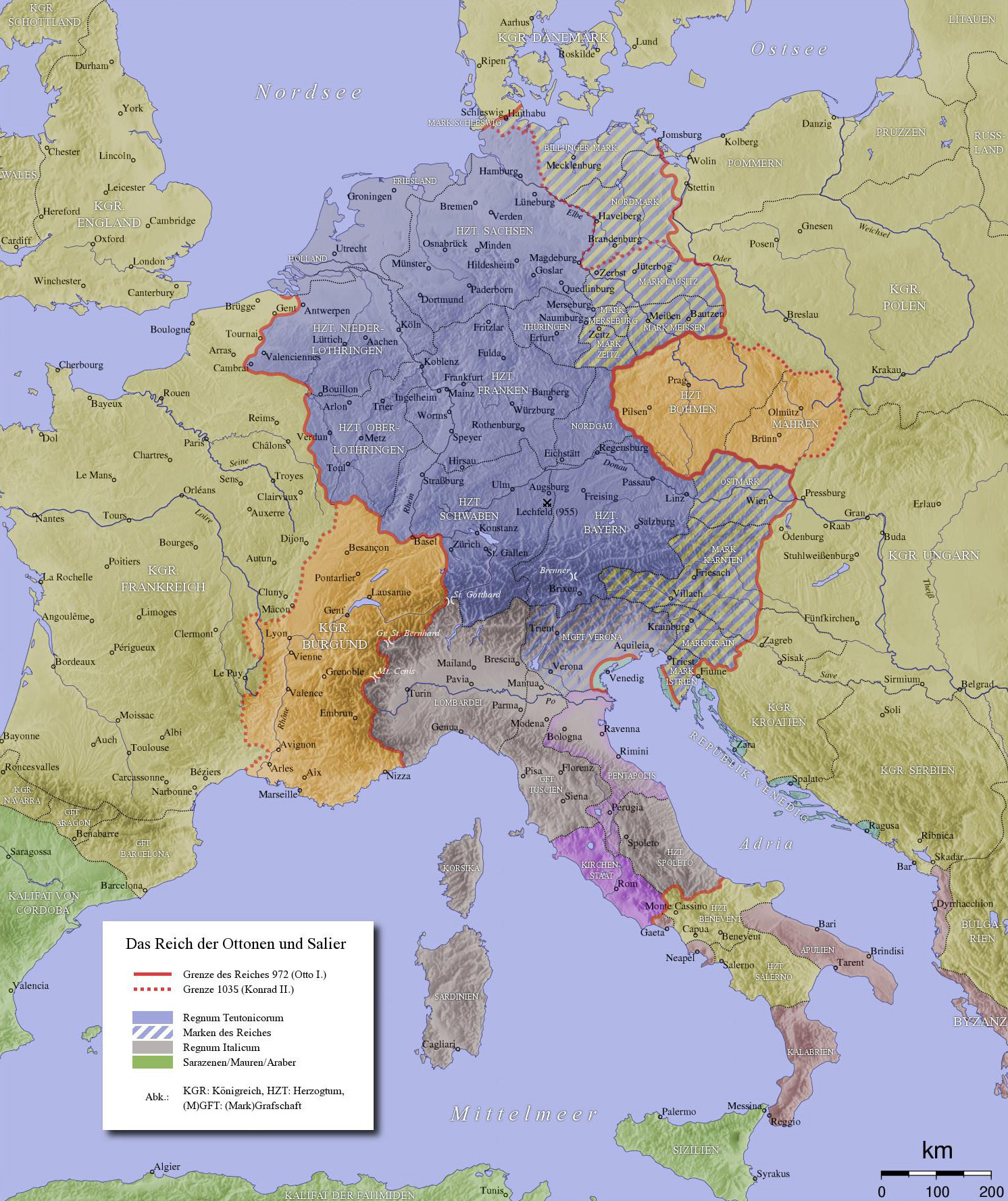
The Holy Roman Empire in the 10th century showing Bavarian marches, including Carinthia.

The emperor Charlemagne deposed the last Agilolfing duke of Bavaria, Tassilo III, in 788, assuming direct control of the Duchy. Charlemagne subsequently led the Franks and Bavarians against the Avars in 791, so that by 803 they had fallen back to the east of the Fischa and Leitha rivers. These conquests enabled the establishment of a system of defensive marches (military borderlands) from the Danube to the Adriatic. Among these was an eastern march, the Avar March, corresponding roughly to present day Lower Austria, bordered by the rivers Enns, Raab and Drava, while to the south lay the March of Carinthia. Both marches were collectively referred to as the Marcha orientalis (Eastern March): a prefecture of the Duchy of Bavaria. During the following centuries, Bavarian settlers went down the Danube and up the Alps, a process through which the Eastern March was to become a mostly German-speaking region. In 805, the Avars, with Charlemagne's permission, led by the Avar Khagan, settled south-eastward from Vienna.

A new threat appeared in 862 from the Hungarians, following the pattern of displacement from more eastern territories by superior forces. By 896 the Hungarians were present in large numbers on the Hungarian Plain from which they raided the Frankish domains. In 906 they defeated the Moravians, in 907 defeated the Bavarians at the Battle of Pressburg, and by 909 had overrun the marches, forcing the Franks and Bavarians back to the Enns River.

However, in 955 the German King, Otto I, successfully forced back the Hungarians at the Battle of Lechfeld, beginning a slow reconquest of the eastern lands. By 960 he had re-established the Eastern March and appointed Burkhard, a brother-in-law of Judith, Duchess of Bavaria, as Margrave. (Note: The marches were overseen by a comes or dux as appointed by the emperor. These terms are usually translated as count or duke, but these terms conveyed very different meanings in the Early Middle Ages, so to avoid misunderstanding historians usually employ the Latin versions when discussing the titles and their holders. In Lombardic speaking countries, the title was eventually regularized to margrave (German: markgraf) i.e. "count of the mark.") However, when Burkhard joined the uprising of Duke Henry II of Bavaria against Otto's son, Emperor Otto II in 976, he was deposed, with the territory was given to Leopold of Babenberg.

=== Babenberg Austria (Note: The first recorded instance of the name 'Austria' appeared in 996, in a document of King Otto III, written as Ostarrîchi, referring to the territory of the Babenberg March. In addition, for a long time the form Osterlant was in use, the inhabitants being referred to as Ostermann or Osterfrau. The Latinized name Austria applied to this area appears in the 12th Century writings in the time of Leopold III (1095–1136). (compare Austrasia as the name for the north-eastern part of the Frankish Empire). The term Ostmark is not historically certain and appears to be a translation of marchia orientalis that came up only much later.) (976–1246) ===
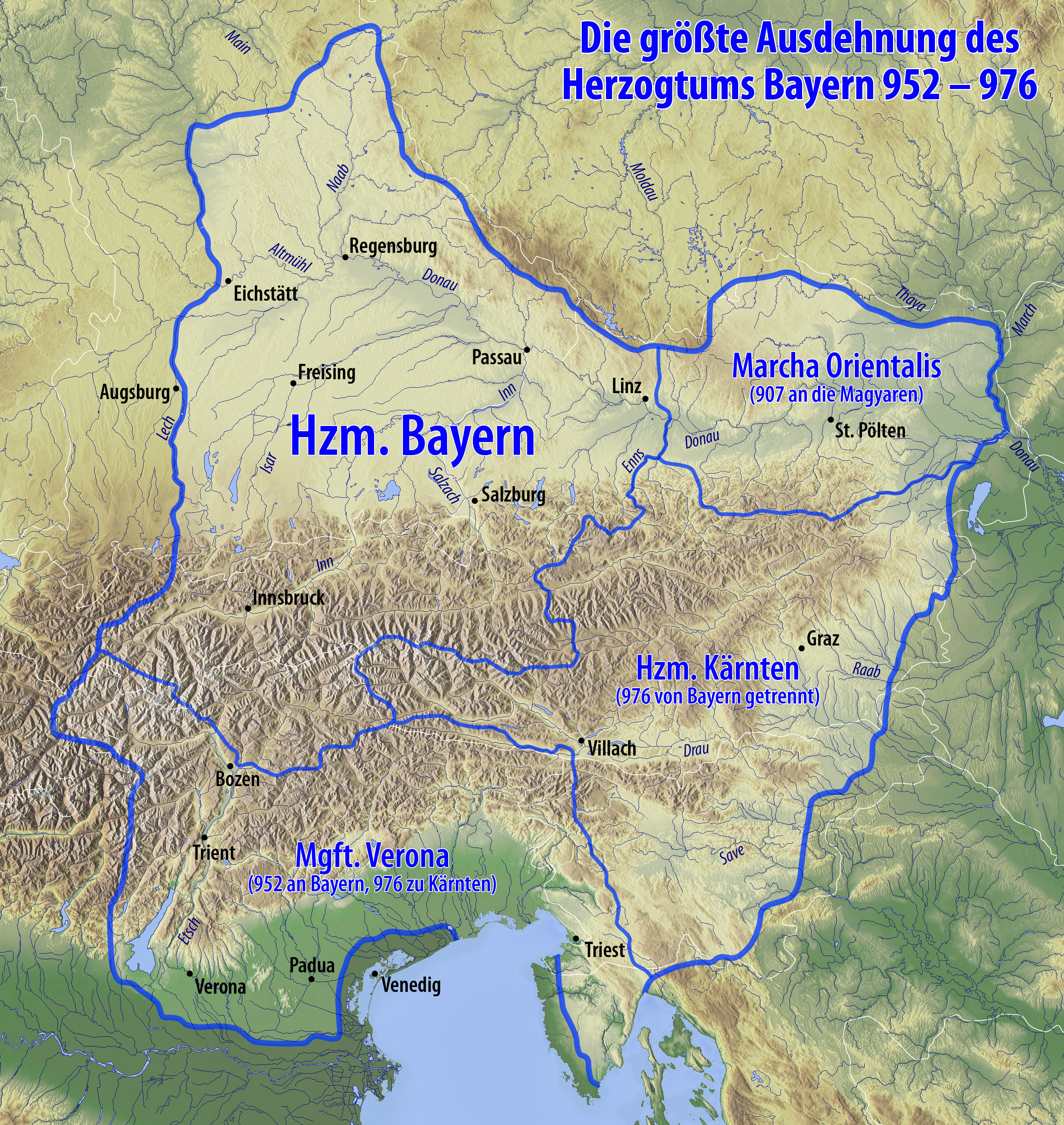
Duchy of Bavaria 976

==== Margraviate (976–1156) ====
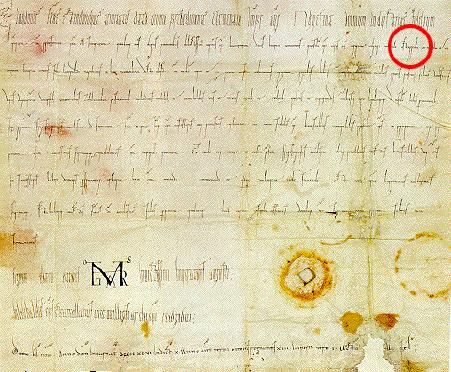
Ostarrîchi in document from time of Otto III.

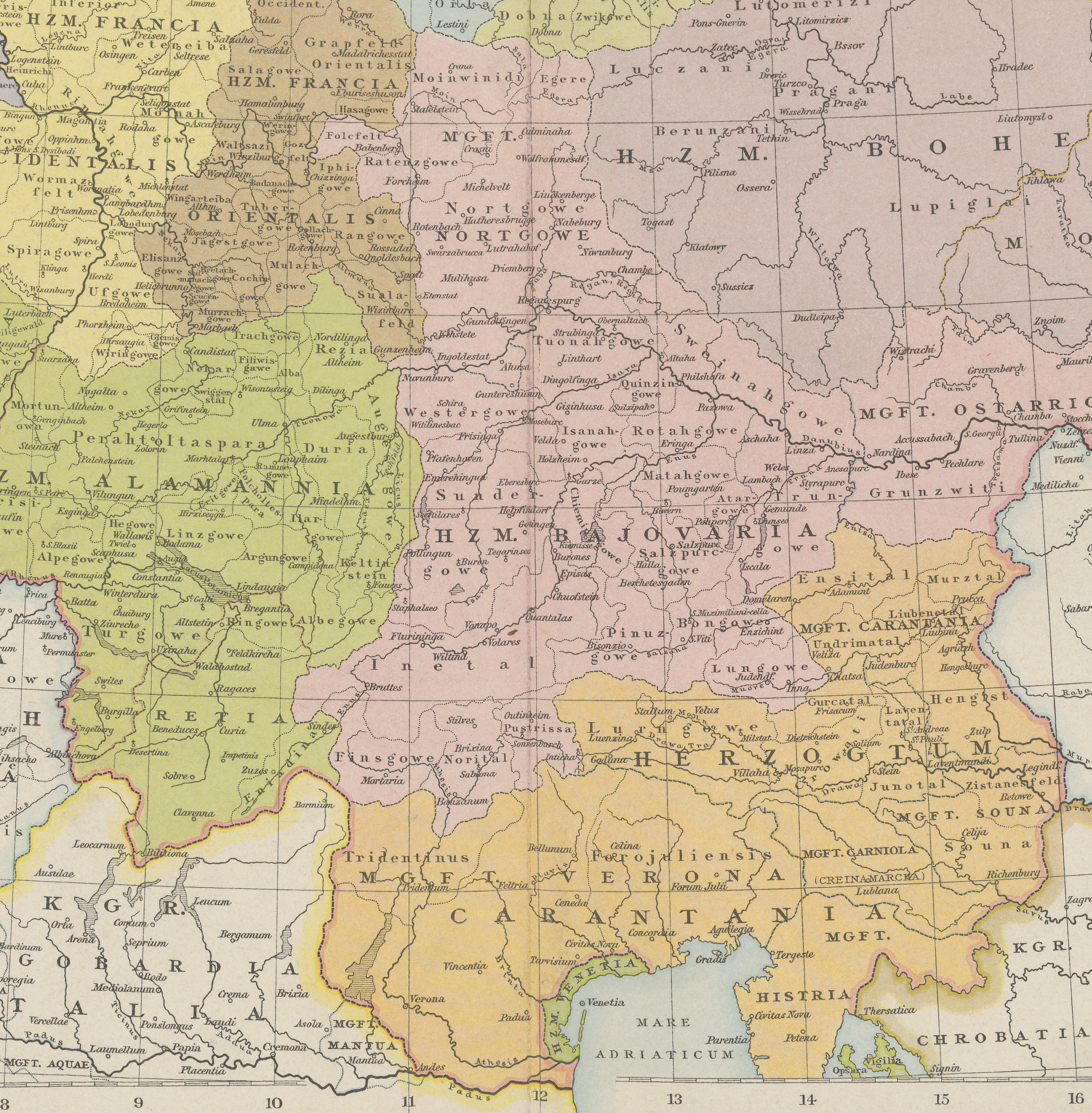
The Duchy of Bavaria (Bajovaria), Margravate of Ostarrichi and the Duchy of Carantania c. 1000.

The Babenbergs pursued a policy of settling the country, clearing forests and founding towns and monasteries. They ruled the March from Pöchlarn initially, and later from Melk, continually expanding the territory eastward along the Danube valley, so that by 1002 it reached Vienna. The eastward expansion was finally halted by the newly Christianized Hungarians in 1030, when King Stephen (1001–1038) of Hungary defeated the Emperor Conrad II (1024–1039) at Vienna.

The Babenberg Margraves had relatively small holdings. However, they embarked on a programme of consolidating their power base. One such method was to employ indentured servants such as the Kuenringern family as Ministeriales and give them considerable military and administrative duties. They survived as a dynasty through good fortune and skill at power politics in an era dominated by the continual struggle between emperor and papacy.

The path was not always smooth. The fifth Margrave, Leopold II 'The Fair' (1075–1095), was temporarily deposed by the Emperor Henry IV (1084–1105) after finding himself on the wrong side of the Investiture Dispute. However, Leopold's son, Leopold III 'The Good' (1095–1136), backed Henry's rebellious son, Henry V (1111–1125), contributed to his victory, and was rewarded with the hand of Henry's sister Agnes von Waiblingen in 1106, thus allying himself with the Imperial family. Leopold then concentrated on pacifying the nobility. His monastic foundations, particularly Klosterneuburg and Heiligenkreuz, led to his posthumous canonisation in 1458, and he became Austria's patron saint.

==== Union with Bavaria (1139) ====
Leopold III was succeeded by his son, Leopold IV 'The Generous' (1137–1141). Leopold further enhanced the status of Austria by also becoming Duke of Bavaria in 1139, as Leopold I. Bavaria itself had been in the hands of the Welf (Guelph) dynasty, who were pitted against the Hohenstaufen. The latter came to the imperial throne in 1138 in the person of Conrad III (1138–1152); the Duke of Bavaria, Henry the Proud, was himself a candidate for the imperial crown and disputed the election of Conrad, and was subsequently deprived of the Duchy, which was given to Leopold IV. When Leopold died, his lands were inherited by his brother Henry II (Heinrich Jasomirgott) (1141–1177).

In the meantime, Conrad had been succeeded as emperor by his nephew Frederick I Barbarossa (1155–1190), who was descended from both the Welfs and Hohenstauffens and sought to end the conflicts within Germany. To this end he returned Bavaria to the Welfs in 1156, but as compensation elevated Austria to a duchy through an instrument known as the Privilegium Minus. Henry II thus became Duke of Austria in exchange for relinquishing the title of Duke of Bavaria. Austria was now an independent dominion within the Holy Roman Empire, and Henry moved his official residence to Vienna that year.

==== Duchy of Austria (1156–1246) ====
===== Leopold V the Virtuous and union with Styria (1177–1194) =====
In 1186 the Georgenberg Pact bequeathed Austria's southern neighbour, the Duchy of Styria, to Austria upon the death of the childless Duke Ottokar IV, which occurred in 1192. The second Duke of Austria, Henry II's son Leopold V the Virtuous (1177–1194) became Duke of these combined territories.

At that time, the Babenberg Dukes came to be one of the most influential ruling families in the region, peaking in the reign of Leopold VI the Glorious (1198–1230), the fourth Duke, under whom the culture of the High Middle Ages flourished, including the introduction of Gothic art.

===== Frederick the Quarrelsome: Division of the land and end of a dynasty (1230–1246) =====
On Leopold's death, he was succeeded by his son Frederick II the Quarrelsome (1230–1246). In 1238 Frederick divided the duchy into two parts divided by the River Enns. The part above the Enns became Ob(erhalb) der Enns (Above the Enns) or 'Upper Austria'; the lands below the Enns or unter der Enns became known as Lower Austria. Another of Frederick's achievements was a Patent of Protection for Jews in 1244.

However, Frederick was killed in the Battle of the Leitha River against the Hungarians and had no surviving children. Thus the Babenburg dynasty became extinct in 1246.

=== Interregnum (1246–1278) ===
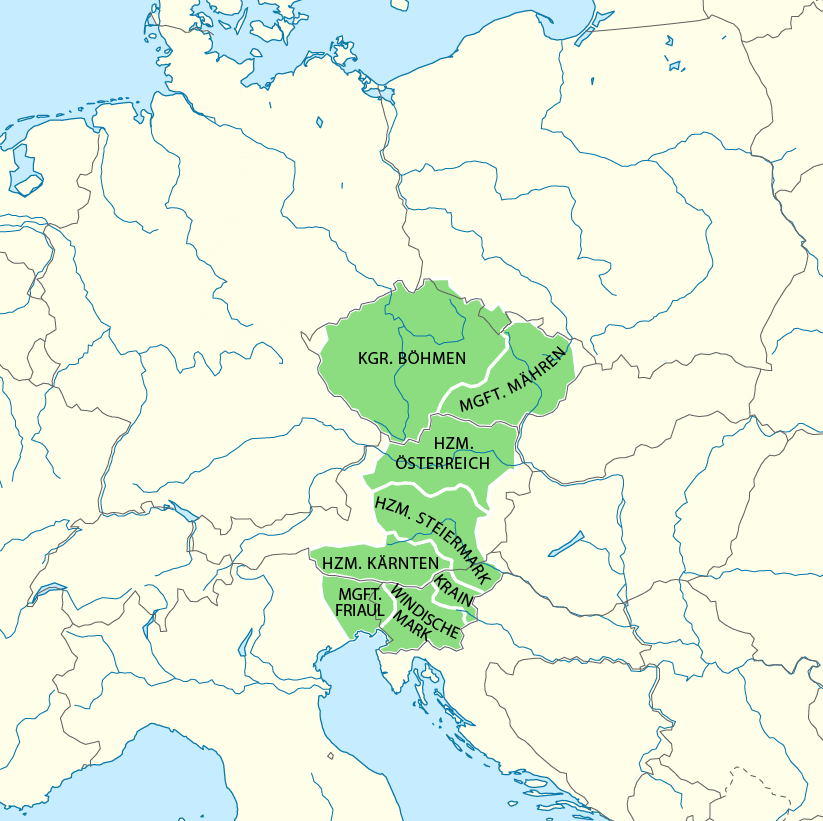
The realms of Ottokar II.

What followed was an interregnum, a period of several decades during which the status of the country was disputed, and during which Frederick II's duchy fell victim to a prolonged power play between rival forces. During this time there were multiple claimants to the title, including Vladislaus, Margrave of Moravia son of King Wenceslaus I of Bohemia. King Wenceslaus aimed at acquiring the Duchy of Austria by arranging the marriage of Vladislaus to the last Duke's niece Gertrud, herself a potential heir and claimant.

According to the Privilegium Minus issued by Emperor Frederick Barbarossa in 1156, the Austrian lands could be bequeathed through the female line. Vladislaus received the homage of the Austrian nobility, but died shortly afterwards, on 3 January 1247, before he could take possession of the duchy. Next came Herman of Baden in 1248. He also made claim by seeking Gertrud's hand but did not have the support of the nobility. Herman died in 1250, and his claim was taken up by his son Frederick, but his claim was thwarted by the Bohemian invasion of Austria.

In an attempt to end the turmoil a group of Austrian nobles invited the king of Bohemia, Ottokar II Přemysl, Vladislaus' brother, to become Austria's ruler in 1251. His father had attempted to invade Austria in 1250. Ottokar then proceeded to ally himself to the Babenbergs by marrying Margaret, Duke Frederick II's sister and daughter to Leopold VI, therefore making him a potential claimant to the throne, in 1252. He subdued the quarrelsome nobles and made himself ruler of most of the area, including Austria, Styria (which was previously under the rule of Hungary) as well as Carniola and Carinthia, both of which he had claimed by a dubious right of inheritance.

Ottokar was a lawmaker and builder. Among his achievements was the founding of the Hofburg Palace in Vienna. Ottokar was in a position to establish a new empire, given the weakness of the Holy Roman Empire on the death of Frederick II (1220–1250) particularly after the Hohenstauffen dynasty was ended in 1254 with the death of Conrad IV and the ensuing Imperial interregnum (1254–1273). Thus Ottokar put himself forward as a candidate for the imperial throne, but was unsuccessful.

==== Religious persecution ====
During the interregnum, Austria was the scene of intense persecution of heretics by the Inquisition. The first instances appear in 1260 in over forty parishes in the southern Danube region between the Salzkammergut and the Vienna Woods, and were mainly directed against the Waldensians.

==== Habsburg ascent and death of Ottokar (1273–1278) ====
Ottokar again contested the Imperial Throne in 1273, being almost alone in this position in the electoral college. This time he refused to accept the authority of the successful candidate, Rudolf of Habsburg (Emperor 1273–1291). In November 1274 the Imperial Diet at Nuremberg ruled that all crown estates seized since the death of the Emperor Frederick II (1250) must be restored, and that King Ottokar II must answer to the Diet for not recognising the new emperor, Rudolf. Ottokar refused either to appear or to restore the duchies of Austria, Styria and Carinthia with the March of Carniola, which he had claimed through his first wife, a Babenberg heiress, and which he had seized while disputing them with another Babenberg heir, Margrave Hermann VI of Baden.

Rudolph refuted Ottokar's succession to the Babenberg patrimony, declaring that the provinces must revert to the Imperial crown due to the lack of male-line heirs (a position that however conflicted with the provisions of the Austrian Privilegium Minus). King Ottokar was placed under the imperial ban; and in June 1276 war was declared against him, Rudolf laying siege to Vienna. Having persuaded Ottokar's former ally Duke Henry XIII of Lower Bavaria to switch sides, Rudolph compelled the Bohemian king to cede the four provinces to the control of the imperial administration in November 1276.

Ottokar having relinquished his territories outside of the Czech lands, Rudolph re-invested him with the Kingdom of Bohemia, betrothed his youngest daughter, Judith of Habsburg, (to Ottokar's son Wenceslaus II), and made a triumphal entry into Vienna. Ottokar, however, raised questions about the execution of the treaty, made an alliance with some Piast chiefs of Poland, and procured the support of several German princes, again including Henry XIII of Lower Bavaria. To meet this coalition, Rudolph formed an alliance with King Ladislaus IV of Hungary and gave additional privileges to the Vienna citizens.

On 26 August 1278, the rival armies met at the Battle on the Marchfeld, northeast of Vienna, where Ottokar was defeated and murdered immediately after the end of the battle. The Margraviate of Moravia was subdued and its government entrusted to Rudolph's representatives, leaving Ottokar's widow Kunigunda of Slavonia, in control of only the province surrounding Prague, while the young Wenceslaus II was again betrothed to Judith.

Rudolf was thus able to assume sole control over Austria, as Duke of Austria and Styria (1278–1282) which remained under Habsburg rule for over six centuries, until 1918.

=== The establishment of the Habsburg dynasty: Duchy of Austria (1278–1453) ===
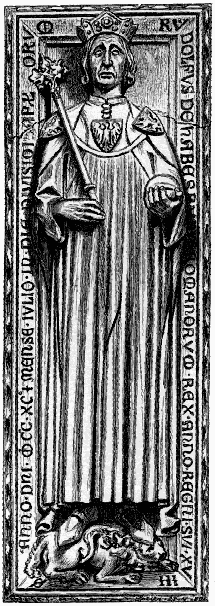
Rudolf of Habsburg, Speyer cathedral where he was buried.

Thus Austria and the Empire came under a single Habsburg crown, and after a few centuries (1438) would remain so almost continuously (see below) till 1806, when the empire was dissolved, obviating the frequent conflicts that had occurred previously.

==== Rudolph I and primogeniture (1278–1358) ====
Rudolf I spent several years establishing his authority in Austria, finding some difficulty in establishing his family as successors to the rule of the province. At length the hostility of the princes was overcome and he was able to bequeath Austria to his two sons. In December 1282, at the Diet of Augsburg, Rudolph invested the duchies of Austria and Styria on his sons, Albert I (1282–1308) and Rudolph II the Debonair (1282–1283) as co-rulers "jointly and severally", and so laid the foundation of the House of Habsburg. Rudolf continued his campaigns subduing and subjugating and adding to his domains, dying in 1291, but leaving dynastic instability in Austria, where frequently the Duchy of Austria was shared between family members. However Rudolf was unsuccessful in ensuring the succession to the imperial throne for the Dukes of Austria and Styria.

The conjoint dukedom lasted only a year until the Treaty of Rheinfelden in 1283 established the Habsburg order of succession. Establishing primogeniture, then eleven-year-old Duke Rudolph II had to waive all his rights to the thrones of Austria and Styria to the benefit of his elder brother Albert I. While Rudolph was supposed to be compensated, this did not happen, dying in 1290, and his son John subsequently murdered his uncle Albert I in 1308. For a brief period, Albert I also shared the duchies with Rudolph III the Good (1298–1307), and finally achieved the imperial throne in 1298.

On Albert I's death, the duchy but not the empire passed to his son, Frederick the Fair (1308–1330), at least not until 1314 when he became co-ruler of the empire with Louis IV. Frederick also had to share the duchy with his brother Leopold I the Glorious (1308–1326). Yet another brother, Albert II the Lame (1330–1358) succeeded Frederick.

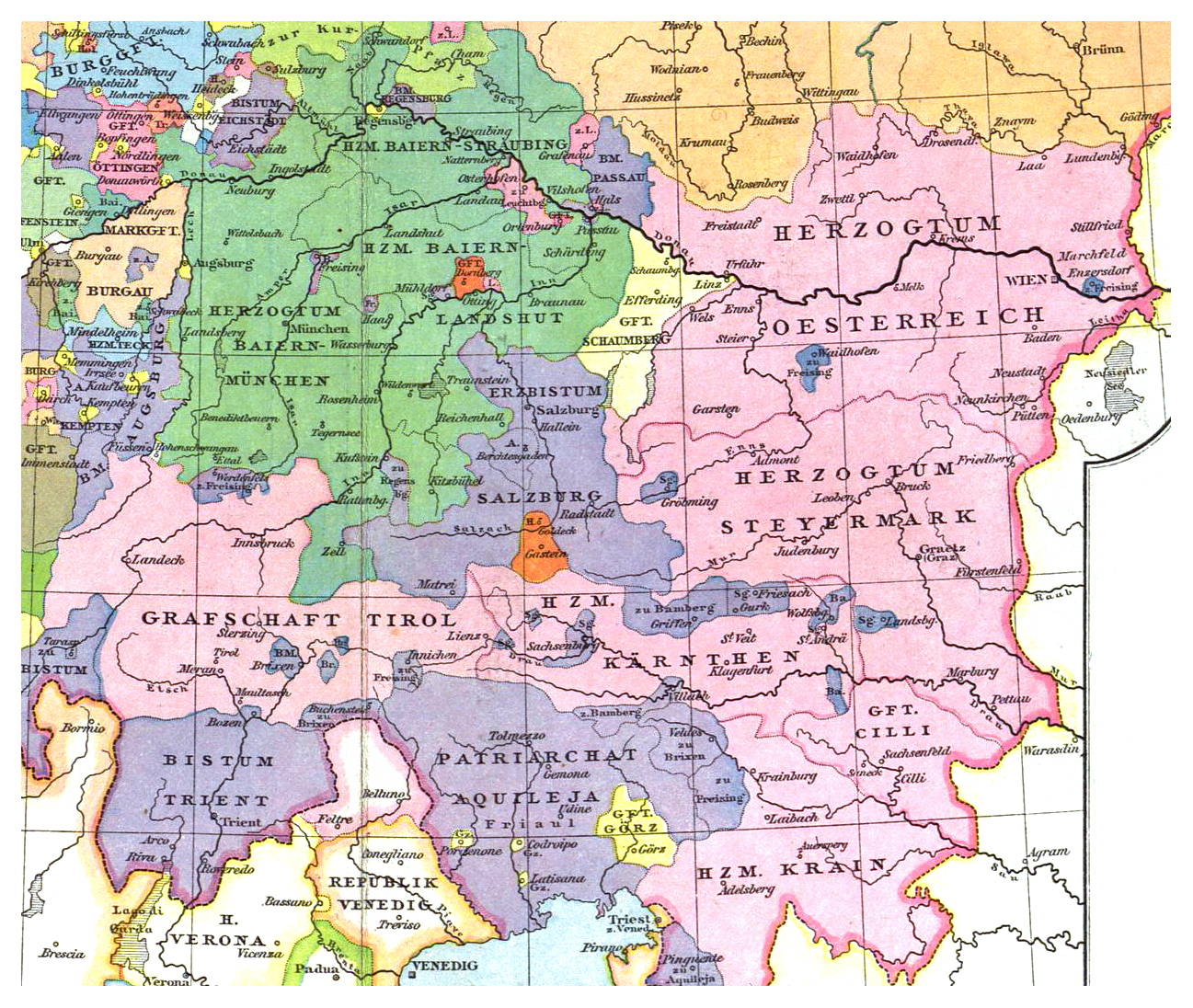
Habsburg dominions in present-day Austria, circa 1350

The pattern of corule persisted, since Albert had to share the role with another younger brother Otto I the Merry (1330–1339), although he did attempt to unsuccessfully lay down the rules of succession in the "Albertinian House Rule". When Otto died in 1339, his two sons, Frederick II and Leopold II replaced him, making three simultaneous Dukes of Austria from 1339 to 1344 when both of them died in their teens without issue. Single rule in the Duchy of Austria finally returned when his son, Rudolph IV succeeded him in 1358.

In the 14th century the Habsburgs began to accumulate other provinces in the vicinity of the Duchy of Austria, which had remained a small territory along the Danube, and Styria, which they had acquired with Austria from Ottokar. In 1335 Albert II inherited the Duchy of Carinthia and the March of Carniola from the then rulers, the House of Gorizia.

==== Rudolph IV and the Privilegium Maius (1358–1365) ====
Rudolf IV the Founder (1358–1365) was the first to claim the title of Archduke of Austria, through the Privilegium Maius of 1359, which was actually a forgery and not recognized outside of Austria till 1453. However it would have placed him on a level footing with the other Prince-electors of the Holy Roman Empire. Rudolph was one of the most active rulers of his time, initiating many measures and elevating the importance of the City of Vienna.

At that time Vienna was ecclesiastically subordinate to the Diocese of Passau, which Rudolph subverted by founding St Stephen's Cathedral and appointing the provost as the Archchancellor of Austria. He also founded the University of Vienna. He improved the economy and established a stable currency, the Vienna Penny. When he died in 1365 he was without issue and the succession passed to his brothers jointly under the Rudolfinian House Rules.

In 1363, the County of Tyrol was acquired by Rudolph IV from Margaret of Tyrol. Thus Austria was now a complex country in the Eastern Alps, and these lands are often referred to as the Habsburg Hereditary Lands, as well as simply Austria, since the Habsburgs also began to accumulate lands far from their Hereditary Lands.

==== Albert III and Leopold III: A house divided (1365–1457) ====
Almost the entire 15th Century was a confusion of estate and family disputes, which considerably weakened the political and economic importance of the Habsburg lands. It was not until 1453 in the reign of Frederick V the Peaceful (1457–1493) that the country (at least the core territories) would be finally united again. Rudolph IV's brothers Albert III the Pigtail and Leopold III the Just quarreled ceaselessly and eventually agreed to split the realm in the Treaty of Neuberg in 1379, which was to result in further schisms later. Altogether this resulted in three separate jurisdictions.

- Lower Austrian Territories or Niederösterreich (Upper and Lower Austria)
  - Albertinian Line – extinct 1457, passed to Leopoldians
- Inner Austrian Territories or Innerösterreich (Styria, Carinthia, Carniola, and the Austrian Littoral of Istria and Trieste)
  - Leopoldian Line then Elder Ernestine Line 1406–1457, continuing as Archduchy of Austria.
- Further Austrian Territories or Vorderösterreich (Tyrol, Vorarlberg and the Swabian and Alsatian territories)
  - Leopoldian Line then Junior Tyrolean Line 1406–1490, passed back to Leopoldians

===== Albertinian line (1379–1457) =====
In 1379 Albert III retained Austria proper, ruling till 1395. He was succeeded by his son Albert IV (1395–1404) and grandson Albert V (1404–1439) who regained the imperial throne for the Habsburgs and through his territorial acquisitions was set to become one of the most powerful rulers in Europe had he not died when he did, leaving only a posthumous heir, born four months later (Ladislaus the Posthumous 1440–1457). Instead it was Ladislaus' guardian and successor, the Leopoldian Frederick V the Peaceful (1457–1493) who benefited. The Albertinian line having become extinct, the title now passed back to the Leopoldians. Frederick was so aware of the potential of being the young Ladislaus' guardian that he refused to let him rule independently upon reaching majority (12 in Austria at the time).
At the beginning of September 1452, after besieging Frederick in Wiener Neustadt, the Mailberger Bund (League of Mailberg, a union of provincial estates) secured the extradition of Ladislaus. On 6 September 1452, Count Ulrich von Cilli and the young Ladislaus made a ceremonial entry into Vienna.

===== Leopoldian line (1379–1490) =====
Leopold III took the remaining territories, ruling till 1386. He was succeeded by two of his sons jointly, William the Courteous (1386–1406) and Leopold IV the Fat (1386–1411). In 1402 yet another split in the Duchy occurred, since Leopold III had had four sons and neither Leopold IV or William had heirs. The remaining brothers then divided the territory.

Ernest the Iron (1402–1424) took Inner Austria, while Frederick IV of the Empty Pockets (1402–1439) took Further Austria. Once William died in 1406, this took formal effect with two separate ducal lines, the Elder Ernestine Line and Junior Tyrolean Line respectively.

Ernestine line (Inner Austria 1406–1457)

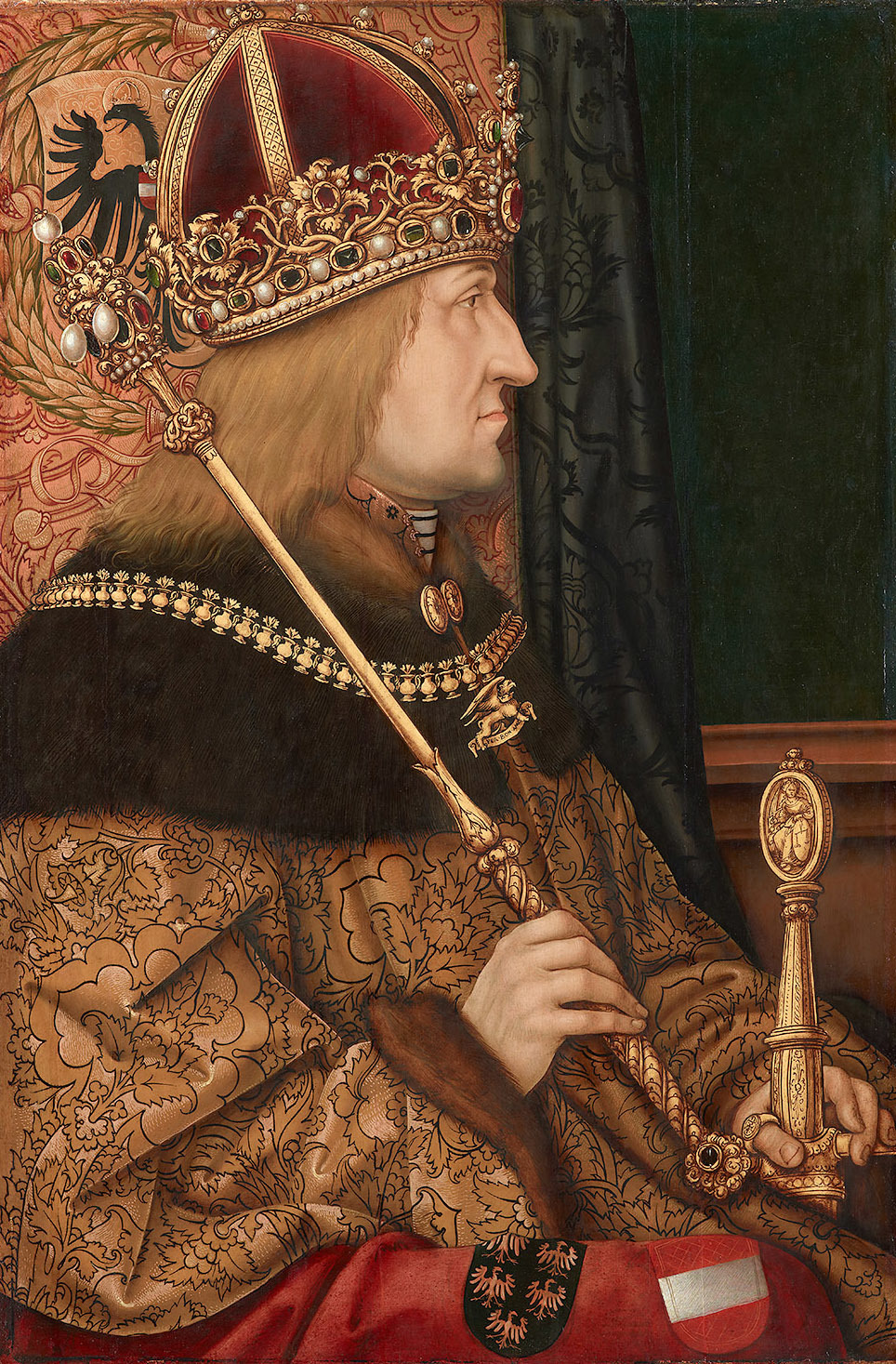
Frederick V (1415–1493) by Hans Burgkmair, c. 1500 (Kunsthistorisches Museum, Vienna). Duke 1424, King 1440, Emperor 1452, Archduke 1457.

The Ernestine line consisted of Ernest and a joint rule by two of his sons upon his death in 1424, Albert VI the Prodigal (1457–1463) and Frederick V the Peaceful (1457–1493). They too quarreled and in turn divided what had now become both Lower and Inner Austria upon the death of Ladislaus in 1457 and extinction of the Albertinians. Albert seized Upper Austria in 1458, ruling from Linz, but in 1462 proceeded to besiege his elder brother in the Hofburg Palace in Vienna, seizing lower Austria too. However, since he died childless the following year (1463) his possessions automatically reverted to his brother, and Frederick now controlled all of the Albertinian and Ernestine possessions.

Frederick's political career had advanced in a major way, since he inherited the Duchy of Inner Austria in 1424. From being a Duke, he became German King as Frederick IV in 1440 and Holy Roman Emperor as Frederick III (1452–1493).

Tyrolean line (Further Austria) 1406–1490

The Tyrolean line consisted of Frederick IV and his son, Sigismund the Rich (1439–1490). Frederick moved his court to Innsbruck but lost some of his possessions to Switzerland. Sigismund who succeeded him sold some of his lands to Charles the Bold in 1469 and was elevated to Archduke by Emperor Frederick III in 1477. He died childless, but in 1490, he abdicated in the face of unpopularity and Further Austria reverted to the then Archduke, Maximilian I the Last Knight (1490–1493), Frederick V's son who now effectively controlled all the Habsburg territory for the first time since 1365.

==== Religious persecution ====
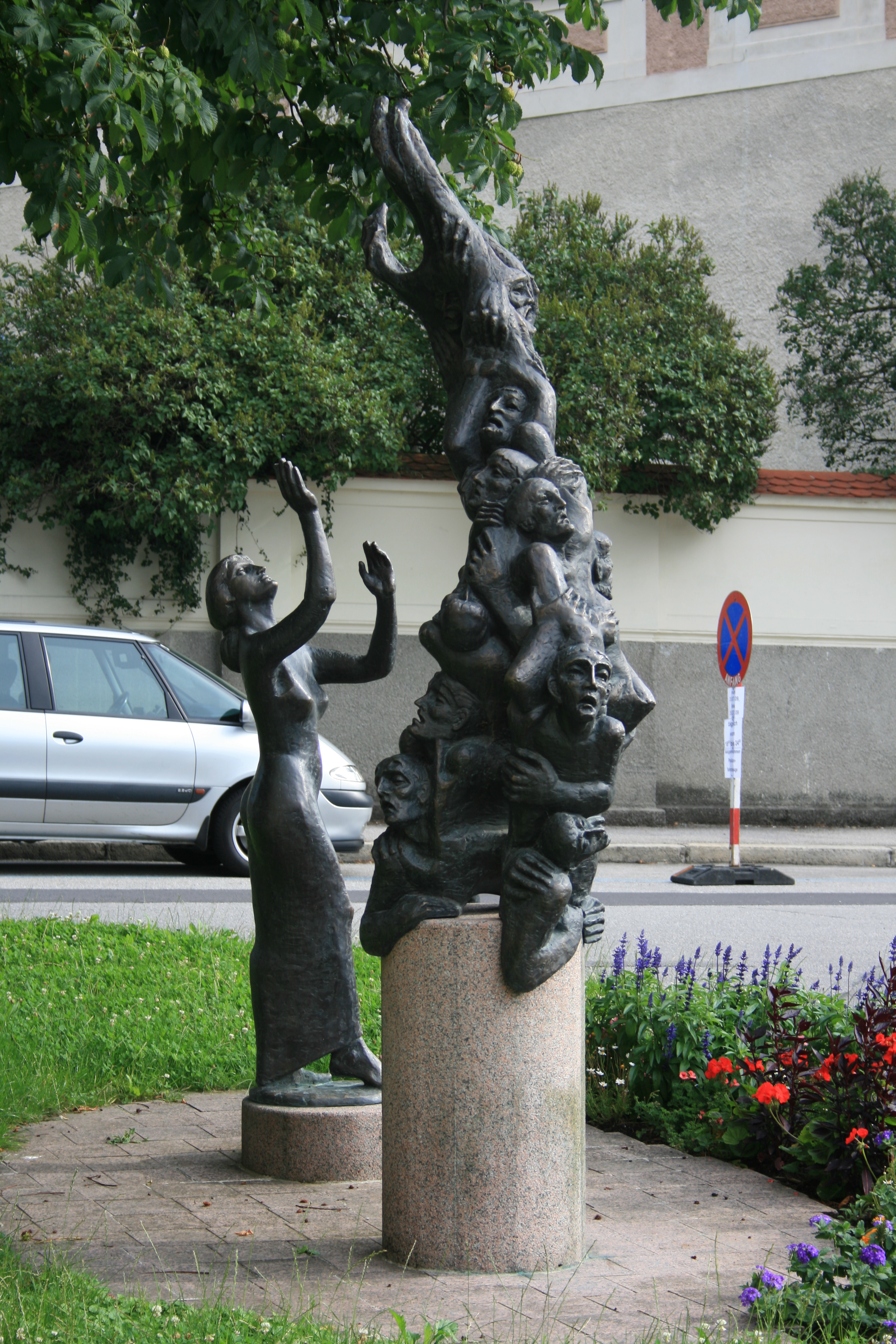
1997 Monument to those burned by Petrus Zwicker in Steyr in 1397.

The inquisition was also active under the Habsburgs, particularly between 1311 and 1315 when inquisitions were held in Steyr, Krems, St. Pölten and Vienna. The Inquisitor, Petrus Zwicker, conducted severe persecutions in Steyr, Enns, Hartberg, Sopron and Vienna between 1391 and 1402. In 1397 there were some 80–100 Waldensians burnt in Steyr alone, now remembered in a 1997 monument.

==== Duchy and Kingdom ====
During the Habsburg Duchy, there were 13 consecutive Dukes, of whom four were also crowned King of Germany, Rudolf I, Albert I, Frederick the Fair, and Albert V (Albert II as King of Germany), although none were recognised as Holy Roman Emperors by the Pope.

When Duke Albert V (1404–1439) was elected as emperor in 1438 (as Albert II), as the successor to his father-in-law, Sigismund von Luxemburg (1433–1437) the imperial crown returned once more to the Habsburgs. Although Albert himself only reigned for a year (1438–1439), from then on, every emperor was a Habsburg (with only one exception: Charles VII 1742–1745), and Austria's rulers were also the Holy Roman Emperors until its dissolution in 1806.

=== Archduchy of Austria: Becoming a Great Power (1453–1564) ===
==== Frederick V (1453–1493): Elevation of the duchy ====
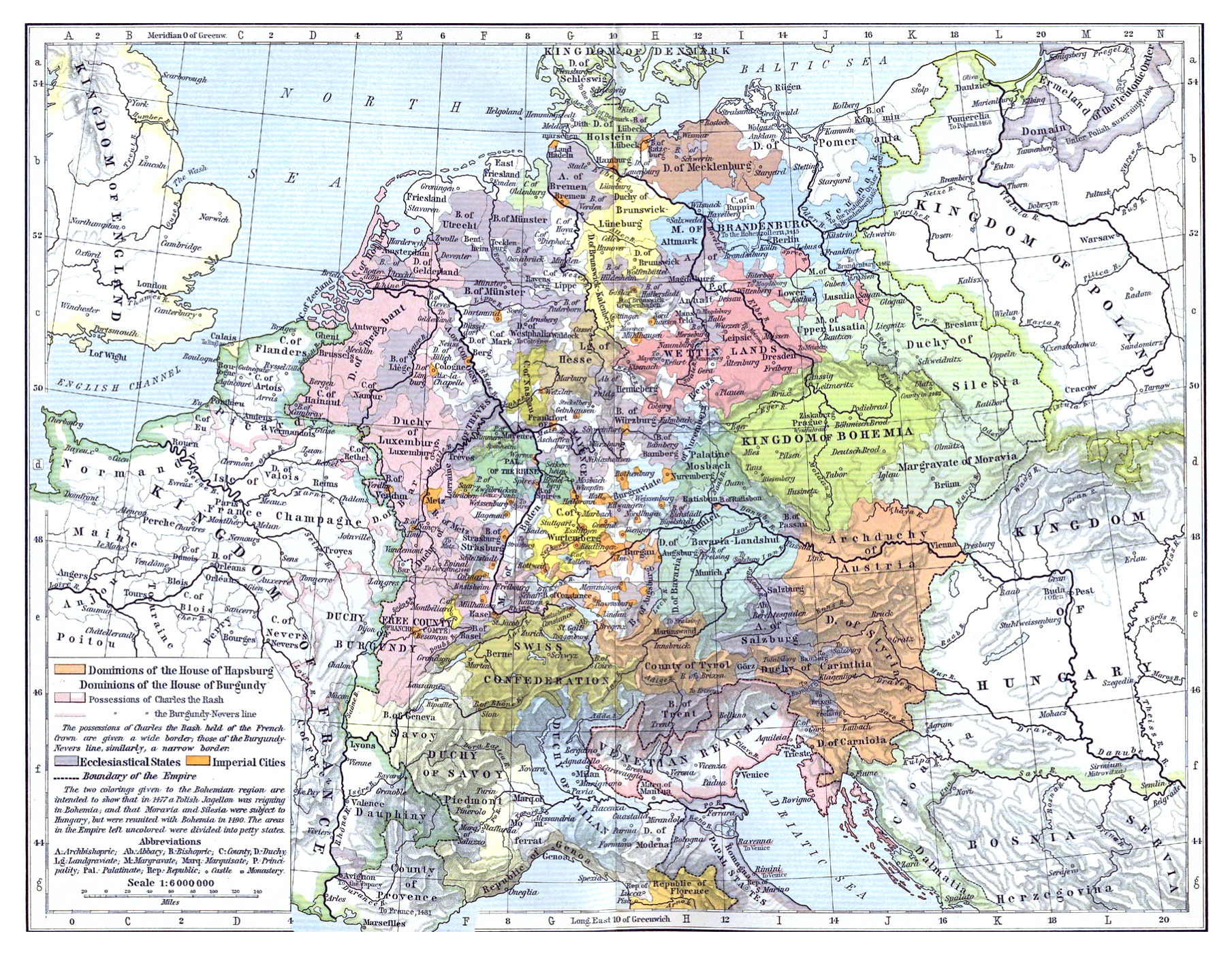
Habsburg lands under Frederick V, c. 1477

Frederick V (Duke 1424 Archduke 1453, died 1493) the Peaceful (Emperor Frederick III 1452-–1493) confirmed the Privilegium Maius of Rudolph IV in 1453, and so Austria became an official archduchy of the Holy Roman Empire, the next step in its ascendancy within Europe, and Ladislaus the Posthumous (1440–1457) the first official archduke for a brief period, dying shortly after. The document was a forgery, purportedly written by the Emperor Frederick I and "rediscovered". Frederick had a clear motive for this. He was a Habsburg, he was Duke of Inner Austria in addition to being Emperor, and, up till the previous year, had been guardian of the young Duke of Lower Austria, Ladislaus. He also stood to inherit Ladislaus's title, and did so when Ladislaus died four years later, becoming the second Archduke.

The Austrian Archdukes were now of equal status to the other Prince Electors that selected the emperors. Austrian governance was now to be based on primogeniture and indivisibility. Later Austria was to become officially known as "Erzherzogtum Österreich ob und unter der Enns" (The Archduchy of Austria above and below the Enns). In 1861 it was again divided into Upper and Lower Austria.

The relative power of the emperor in the monarchy was not great, as many other aristocratic dynasties pursued their own political power inside and outside the monarchy. However Frederick, although lackluster, pursued a tough and effective rule. He pursued power through dynastic alliances. In 1477 Maximilian (Archduke and Emperor 1493–1519), Frederick's only son, married Mary, Duchess of Burgundy, thus acquiring most of the Low Countries for the family. The strategic importance of this alliance was that Burgundy, which lay on the western border of the empire, was demonstrating expansionist tendencies, and was at that time one of the richest and most powerful of the Western European nation states, with territories stretching from the south of France to the North Sea.

The alliance was achieved at no small cost, since France, which also claimed Burgundy, contested this acquisition, and Maximilian had to defend his new wife's territories from Louis XI, finally doing so upon Mary's death in 1482 at the Peace of Arras. Relationships with France remained difficult, Louis XI being defeated at the Battle of Guinegate in 1479. Matters with France were only concluded in 1493 at the Treaty of Senlis after Maximilian had become emperor.

This and Maximilian's later dynastic alliances gave rise to the saying:

Bella gerant alii, tu felix Austria nube,
Nam quae Mars aliis, dat tibi regna Venus (Note: Let others wage war, but thou, O happy Austria, marry; for those kingdoms which Mars gives to others, Venus gives to thee)

which became a motto of the dynasty. Frederick's reign was pivotal in Austrian history. He united the core lands by simply outliving the rest of his family. From 1439, when Albert V died and the responsibilities for both of the core territories lay with Frederick, he systematically consolidated his power base. The next year (1440) he marched on Rome as King of the Romans with his ward, Ladislaus the last Albertinian duke, and when he was crowned in Rome in 1452 he was not only the first Habsburg but also the last German king to be crowned in Rome by the Pope.

The dynasty was now en route to become a world power. The concept of pietas austriacae (the divine duty to rule) had originated with Rudolph I, but was reformulated by Frederick as AEIOU, Alles Erdreich ist Österreich untertan or Austriae est imperare orbi universo (Austria's destiny is to rule the world), which came to symbolise Austrian power. However, not all events proceeded smoothly for Frederick. The Austrian-Hungarian War (1477–1488) resulted in the Hungarian king, Matthias Corvinus setting himself up in Vienna in 1485 till his death in 1490. Hungary occupied the entire Eastern Austria. Frederick therefore found himself with an itinerant court, predominantly in the Upper Austrian capital of Linz.

==== Maximilian I (1493–1519): Reunification ====
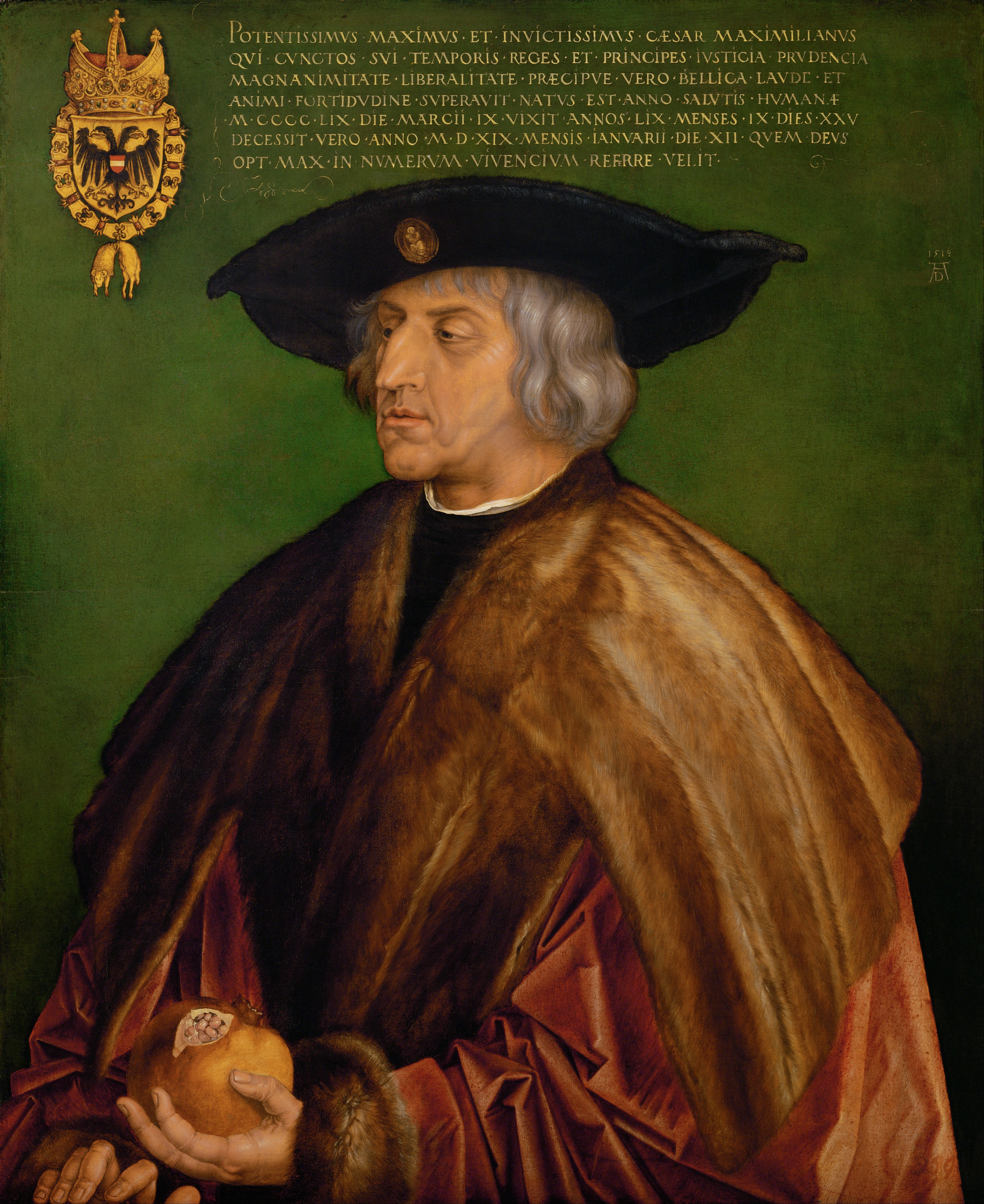
Maximilian I by Albrecht Dürer 1519

Maximilian I shared rule with his father during the latter year of Frederick's reign, being elected King of the Romans in 1486. By acquiring the lands of the Tyrolean line of the Habsburgs in 1490 he finally reunited all the Austrian lands, divided since 1379. He also needed to deal with the Hungarian problem when Mathias I died in 1490. Maximilian reconquered the lost parts of Austria and established peace with Mathias's successor Vladislaus II at the Peace of Pressburg in 1491. However the dynastic pattern of division and unification would be one that kept repeating itself over time. With unsettled borders Maximilian found Innsbruck in the Tyrol a safer place for a capital, between his Burgundian and Austrian lands, although he was rarely in any place for very long, being acutely aware of how his father had been repeatedly besieged in Vienna.

Maximilian raised the art of dynastic alliance to a new height and set about systematically creating a dynastic tradition, albeit through considerable revisionism. His wife Mary, was to die in 1482, only five years after they were married. He then married Anne, Duchess of Brittany (by proxy) in 1490, a move that would have brought Brittany, at that time independent, into the Habsburg fold, which was considered provocative to the French monarchy. Charles VIII of France had other ideas and annexed Brittany and married Anne, a situation complicated further by the fact that he was already betrothed to Maximilian's daughter Margaret, Duchess of Savoy. Maximilian's son, Philip the Fair (1478–1506) married Joanna, heiress of Castile and Aragon in 1496, and thus acquired Spain and its Italian (Naples, Kingdom of Sicily and Sardinia), African, and New World possessions for the Habsburgs.

However Tu felix Austria nube was perhaps more romantic than strictly realistic, since Maximilian was not slow to wage war when it suited his purpose. Having settled matters with France in 1493, he was soon involved in the long Italian Wars against France (1494–1559). In addition to the wars against the French, there were the wars for Swiss independence. The Swabian War of 1499 marked the last phase of this struggle against the Habsburgs. Following defeat at the Battle of Dornach in 1499, Austria was forced to recognise Swiss independence at the Treaty of Basel in 1499, a process that was finally formalised by the Peace of Westphalia in 1648. This was significant as the Habsburgs had originated in Switzerland, their ancestral home being Habsburg Castle.

In domestic policy, Maximilian launched a series of reforms at the 1495 Diet of Worms, at which the Imperial Chamber Court was launched as the highest court. Another new institution of 1495 was the Reichsregiment or Imperial government, meeting at Nuremberg. This preliminary exercise in democracy failed and was dissolved in 1502. Attempts at creating a unified state were not very successful, but rather re-emerged the idea of the three divisions of Austria that existed prior to the unification of Frederick and Maximilian.

Short of funds for his various schemes he relied heavily on banking families such as the Fugger's, and it was these bankers that bribed the prince electors to choose Maximilian's grandson Charles as his successor. One tradition he did away with was the centuries-old custom that the Holy Roman Emperor had to be crowned by the Pope in Rome. Unable to reach Rome, due to Venetian hostility, in 1508, Maximilian, with the assent of Pope Julius II, took the title Erwählter Römischer Kaiser ("Elected Roman Emperor"). Thus his father Frederick was the last emperor to be crowned by the Pope in Rome, though his grandson Charles V would be crowned by the Pope outside of Rome; no other Holy Roman Emperor would be crowned by the Pope.

==== Charles I and Ferdinand I (1519–1564) ====
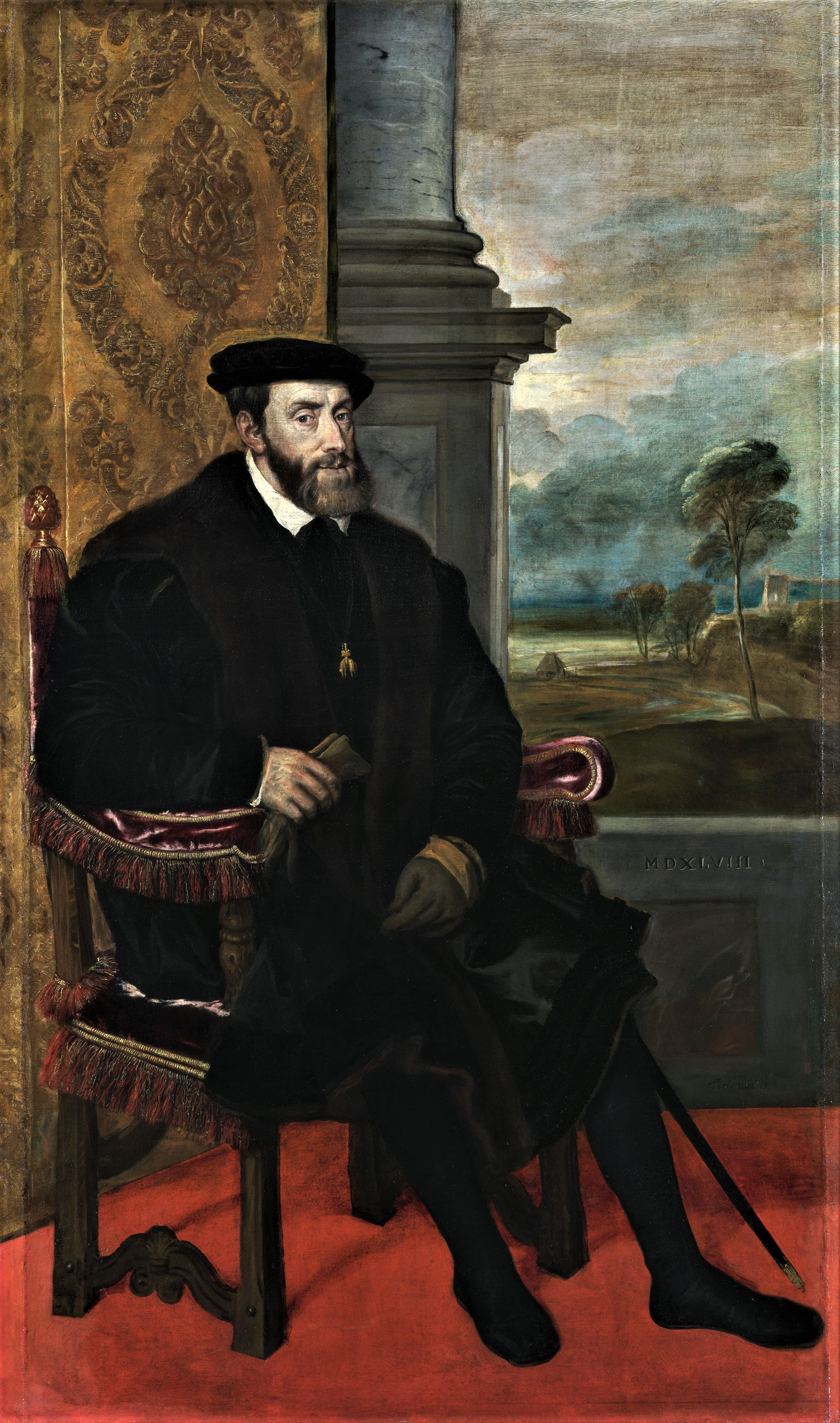
Charles I, attrib. Lambert Sustris 1548, Museo del Prado, Madrid, Spain

Since Philip the Fair (1478–1506) died before his father, Maximilian, the succession passed to Philip's son, Charles I of Spain (1519–1521) who became the Emperor Charles V, on Maximilian's death in 1519. He reigned as emperor from 1519 to 1556, when in poor health he abdicated, dying in 1558. Although crowned by Pope Clement VII in Bologna in 1530 (Charles had sacked Rome in 1527) he was the last emperor ever to be crowned by a Pope. Although he eventually fell short of his vision of universal monarchy, Charles I is still considered the most powerful of all the Habsburgs. His Chancellor, Mercurino Gattinara remarked in 1519 that he was "on the path to universal monarchy ... unite all Christendom under one sceptre" bringing him closer to Frederick V's vision of AEIOU, and Charles' motto Plus ultra (still further) suggested this was his ambition.

Having inherited his father's possessions in 1506, he was already a powerful ruler with extensive domains. On Maximilian's death these domains became vast. He was now ruler of three of Europe's leading dynasties—the House of Habsburg of the Habsburg monarchy; the House of Valois-Burgundy of the Burgundian Netherlands; and the House of Trastámara of the Crowns of Castile and Aragon. This made him ruler over extensive lands in Central, Western, and Southern Europe; and the Spanish colonies in the Americas and Asia. As the first king to rule Castile, León, and Aragon simultaneously in his own right, he became the first King of Spain. His empire spanned nearly four million square kilometers across Europe, the Far East, and the Americas.

A number of challenges stood in Charles's way, and were to shape Austria's history for a long time to come. These were France, the appearance of the Ottoman Empire to its East, and Martin Luther (see below).

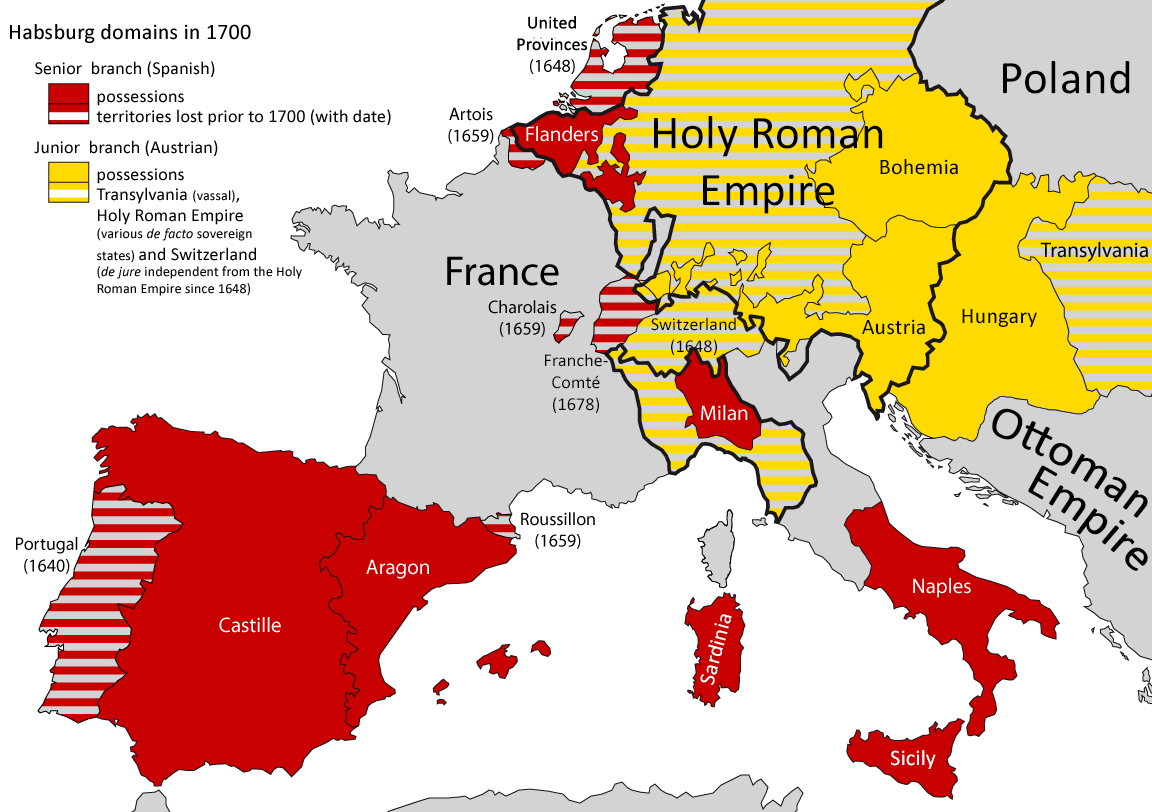
Habsburg dominions in the centuries following their partition by Charles V

Following the dynastic tradition the Habsburgs' hereditary territories were separated from this enormous empire at the Diet of Worms in 1521, when Charles I left them to the regency of his younger brother, Ferdinand I (1521–1564), although he then continued to add to the Habsburg territories. Since Charles left his Spanish Empire to his son Philip II of Spain, the Spanish territories became permanently alienated from the northern Habsburg domains, although remained allies for several centuries.

By the time Ferdinand also inherited the title of Holy Roman Emperor from his brother in 1558 the Habsburgs had effectively turned an elective title into a de facto hereditary one. Ferdinand continued the tradition of dynastic marriages by marrying Anne of Bohemia and Hungary in 1521, effectively adding those two kingdoms to the Habsburg domains, together with the adjacent territories of Moravia, Silesia and Lusatia. This took effect when Anne's brother Louis II, King of Hungary and Bohemia (and hence the Jagiellon dynasty) died without heir at the Battle of Mohács in 1526 against Suleiman the Magnificent and the Ottomans. However, by 1538 the Kingdom of Hungary was divided into three parts:

- The Kingdom of Hungary (Royal Hungary) (today Burgenland, parts of Croatia, mostly Slovakia and parts of present-day Hungary) recognised the Habsburgs as Kings.
- Ottoman Hungary (the center of the country).
- Eastern Hungarian Kingdom, later the Principality of Transylvania under counter kings to the Habsburgs, but also under Ottoman protection.

Ferdinand's election to emperor in 1558 once again reunited the Austrian lands. He had had to cope with revolts in his own lands, religious turmoil, Ottoman incursions and even contest for the Hungarian throne from John Sigismund Zápolya. His lands were by no means the most wealthy of the Habsburg lands, but he succeeded in restoring internal order and keeping the Turks at bay, while enlarging his frontiers and creating a central administration.

When Ferdinand died in 1564, the lands were once more divided up between his three sons, a provision he had made in 1554.

==== Austria in the Reformation and Counter-Reformation (1517–1564) ====
===== Martin Luther and the Protestant Reformation (1517–1545) =====
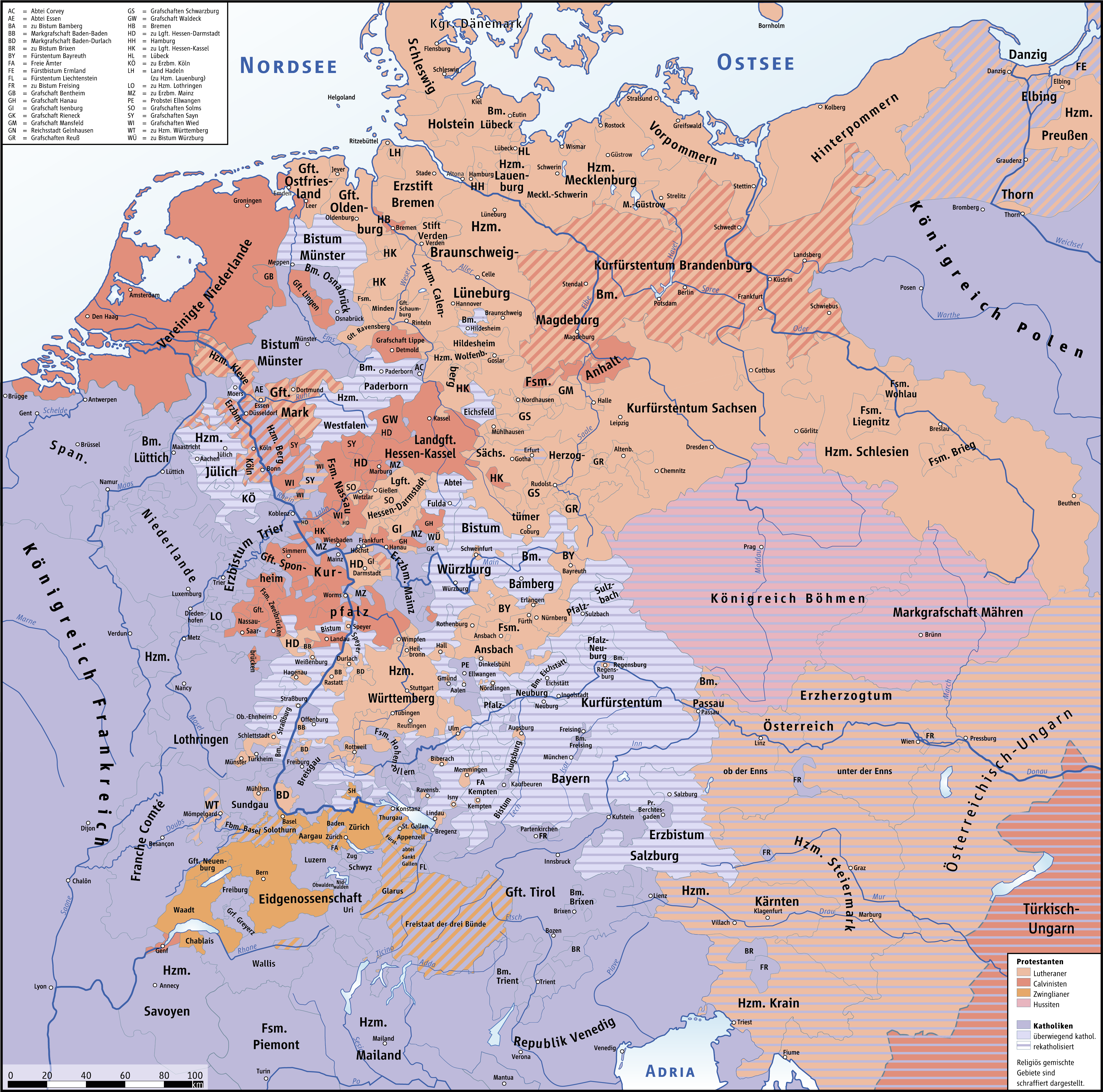
Much of eastern Austria adopted Lutheranism until Counter-Reformational efforts changed it in the late 16th century.

When Martin Luther posted his Ninety-five Theses to the door of the Castle Church in Wittenberg in 1517, he challenged the very basis of the Holy Roman Empire, Catholic Christianity, and hence Habsburg hegemony. After the Emperor Charles V interrogated and condemned Luther at the 1521 Diet of Worms, Lutheranism and the Protestant Reformation spread rapidly in the Habsburg territories. Temporarily freed from war with France by the 1529 Treaty of Cambrai and the denouncement of the ban on Luther by the Protestant princes at Speyer that year, the Emperor revisited the issue next at the Diet of Augsburg in 1530, by which time it was well-established.

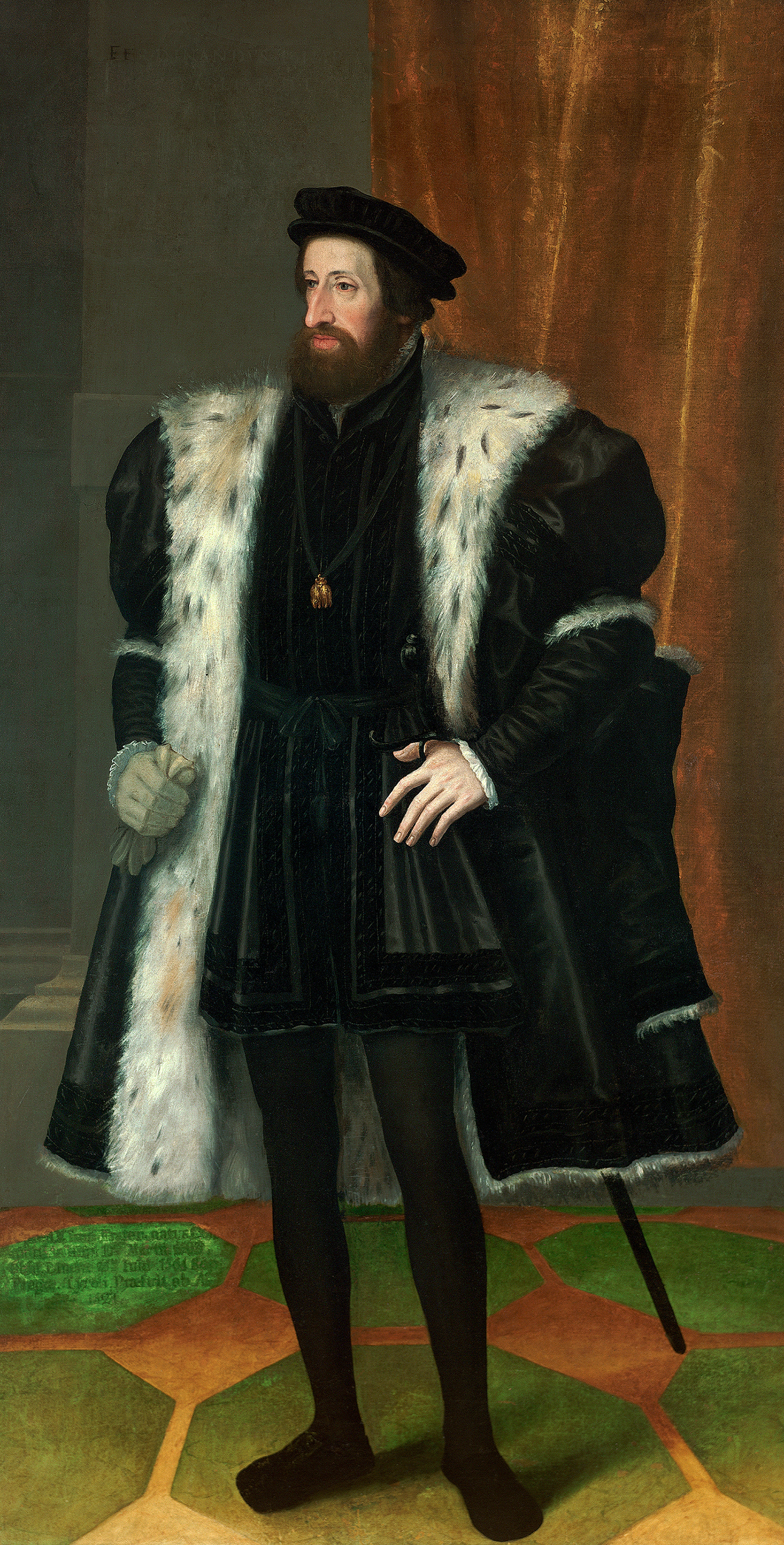
Archduke Ferdinand I, 1521–1564

With the Ottoman threat growing (see below), he needed to ensure that he was not facing a major schism within Christianity. He refuted the Lutheran position (Augsburg Confession) with the Confutatio Augustana, and had Ferdinand elected King of the Romans on 5 January 1531, ensuring his succession as a Catholic monarch. In response, the Protestant princes and estates formed the Schmalkaldic League in February 1531 with French backing. Further Turkish advances in 1532 (which required him to seek Protestant aid) and other wars kept the emperor from taking further action on this front until 1547 when imperial troops defeated the League at the Battle of Mühlberg, allowing him to once more impose Catholicism.

In 1541 Ferdinand's appeal to the estates general for aid against the Turks was met by demand for religious tolerance. The triumph of 1547 turned out to be short lived with French and Protestant forces again challenging the emperor in 1552 culminating in the Peace of Augsburg in 1555. Exhausted, Charles started to withdraw from politics and hand over the reins. Protestantism had proved too firmly entrenched to enable it to be uprooted.

Austria and the other Habsburg hereditary provinces (and Hungary and Bohemia, as well) were much affected by the Reformation, but with the exception of Tyrol the Austrian lands shut out Protestantism. Although the Habsburg rulers themselves remained Catholic, the non-Austrian provinces largely converted to Lutheranism, which Ferdinand I largely tolerated.

===== Counter-Reformation (1545–1563) =====
The Catholic response to the Protestant Reformation was a conservative one, but one that did address the issues raised by Luther. In 1545 the long running Council of Trent began its work of reform and a Counter-Reformation on the borders of the Habsburg domains. The Council continued intermittently until 1563. Ferdinand and the Austrian Habsburgs were far more tolerant than their Spanish brethren, and the process initiated at Trent. However his attempts at reconciliation at the Council in 1562 was rejected, and although a Catholic counteroffensive existed in the Habsburg lands from the 1550s it was based on persuasion, a process in which the Jesuits and Peter Canisius took the lead. Ferdinand deeply regretted the failure to reconcile religious differences before his death (1564).

==== The arrival of the Ottomans (1526–1562) ====
When Ferdinand I married into the Hungarian dynasty in 1521 Austria first encountered the westward Ottoman expansion which had first come into conflict with Hungary in the 1370s. Matters came to a close when his wife Anne's brother the young king Louis was killed fighting the Turks under Suleiman the Magnificent at the Battle of Mohács in 1526, the title passing to Ferdinand. Louis' widow Mary fled to seek protection from Ferdinand.

The Turks initially withdrew following this victory, reappearing in 1528 advancing on Vienna and laying siege to it the following year. They withdrew that winter till 1532 when their advance was stopped by Charles V, although they controlled much of Hungary. Ferdinand was then forced to recognize John Zápolya. Ferdinand and the Turks continued to wage war between 1537 and a temporary truce in 1547 when Hungary was partitioned. However hostilities continued almost immediately till the Treaty of Constantinople of 1562 which confirmed the 1547 borders. The Ottoman threat was to continue for 200 years.

== Redivision of the Habsburg lands (1564–1620) ==
Ferdinand I had three sons who survived to adulthood, and he followed the potentially disastrous Habsburg tradition of dividing up his lands between them on his death in 1564. This considerably weakened Austria, particularly in the face of the Ottoman expansion. It was not until the reign of Ferdinand III (Archduke 1590–1637) that they were reunited again in 1620—albeit briefly until 1623. It was not to be until 1665, under Leopold I that the Austrian lands were definitively united.

During the next 60 years the Habsburg monarchy was divided into three jurisdictions:

- "Lower Austria" – The Austrian Duchies, Bohemia passed to Charles II's line 1619.
  - Maximilian II (1564–1576); Rudolf V (1576–1608); Mathias (1608–1619)
- "Upper Austria" – Tyrol and Further Austria, passed to Maximilian II's line 1595 (under administration of Maximilian III, 1595–1618).
  - Ferdinand II (1564–1595)
- "Inner Austria"
  - Charles II (1564–1590); Ferdinand II (1590–1637)

As the eldest son, Maximilian II and his sons were granted the "core" territories of Lower and Upper Austria. Ferdinand II dying without living issue, his territories reverted to the core territories on his death in 1595, then under Rudolf V (1576–1608), Maximilian II's son.

Maximilian II was succeeded by three of his sons none of whom left living heirs, so the line became extinct in 1619 upon the abdication of Albert VII (1619–1619). Thus Charles II's son Ferdinand III inherited all of the Habsburg lands. However he promptly lost Bohemia which rebelled in 1619 and was briefly (1619–1620) under the rule of Frederick I. Thus all the lands again came under one ruler again in 1620 when Ferdinand III invaded Bohemia, defeating Frederick I.

Although technically an elected position, the title of Holy Roman Emperor was passed down through Maximilian II and the two sons (Rudolf V and Mathias) that succeeded him. Albert VII was Archduke for only a few months before abdicating in favour of Ferdinand III, who also became emperor.

=== "Lower Austria" ===
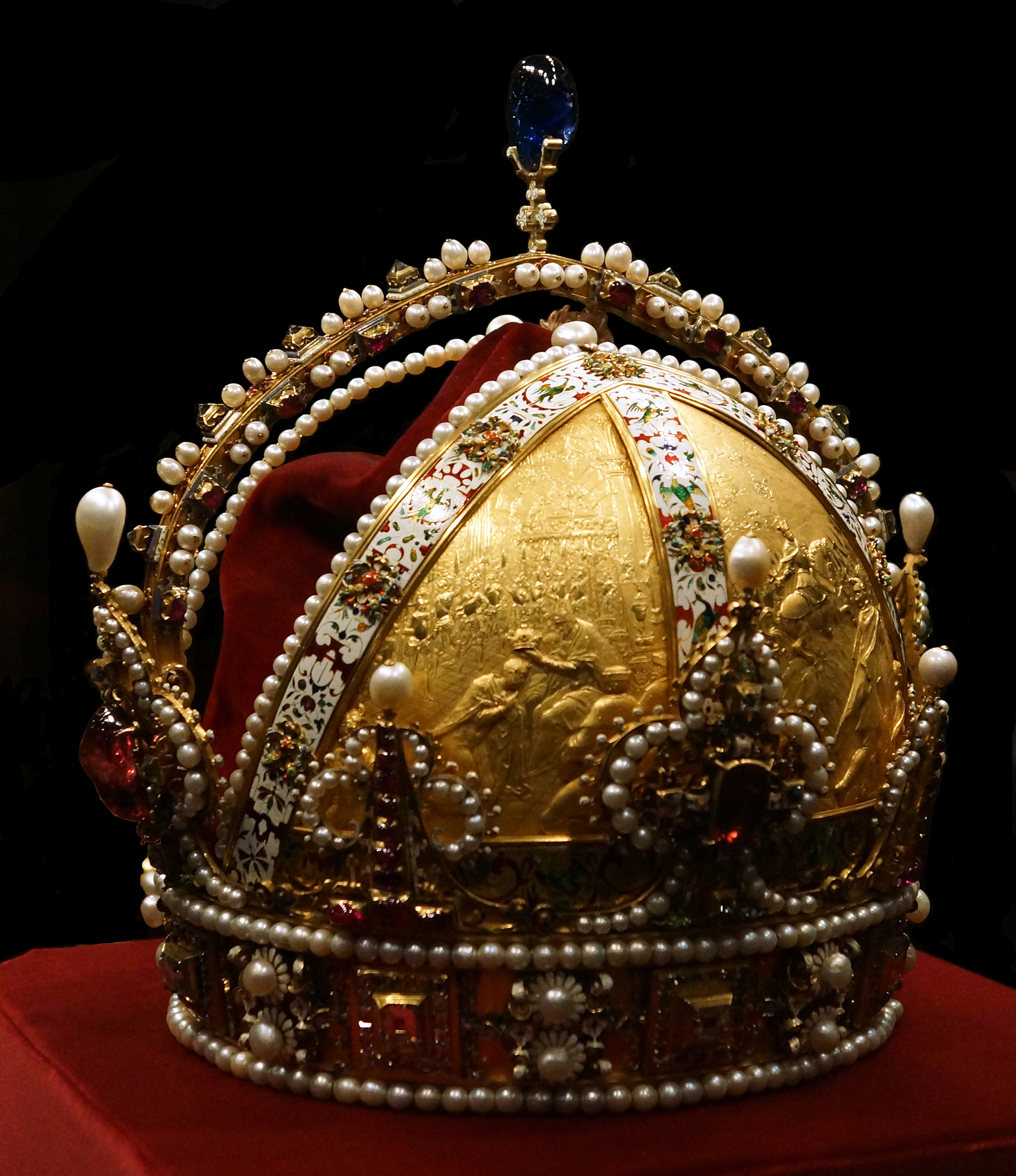
The Crown of Emperor Rudolf II.

Rudolf V (Archduke, Emperor Rudolf II 1576–1612), Maximilian's eldest son, moved his capital from Vienna to the safer venue of Prague, in view of the Ottoman threat. He was noted as a great patron of the arts and sciences but a poor governor. Among his legacies is the Imperial Crown of the Habsburgs. He preferred to parcel out his responsibilities among his many brothers (of whom six lived to adulthood), leading to a great heterogeneity of policies across the lands. Among these delegations was making his younger brother Mathias, Governor of Austria in 1593.

In acquiring "Upper Austria" in 1595, his powers were considerably increased, since the remaining Inner Austria territories were in the hands of Ferdinand III who was only 17 at the time. However he handed over the administration to Maximilian III, another younger brother. In 1593 he instigated a new conflict with the Ottomans, who had resumed raids in 1568, in the so-called Long or Fifteen-Year War of 1593 to 1606. Unwilling to compromise, and envisioning a new crusade the results were disastrous, the exhausted Hungarians revolting in 1604. The Hungarian problem was further exacerbated by attempts to impose a counterreformation there. As a result, he handed over Hungary to Mathias who concluded the Peace of Vienna with the Hungarians, and Peace of Zsitvatorok with the Turks in 1606. As a result, Transylvania became both independent and Protestant.

These events led to conflict between the brothers. Melchior Klesl engineered a conspiracy of the archdukes to ensure Mathias' ascendancy. By 1608 Rudolf had ceded much of his territory to the latter. Further conflict led to Mathias imprisoning his brother in 1611, who now gave up all power except the empty title of emperor, dying the following year and being succeeded by Mathias.

Thus Mathias succeeded to the Archduchy in 1608, and became emperor in 1612, until his death in 1619. His reign was marked by conflict with his younger brother Maximilian III who was a more intransigent Catholic and backed the equally fervent Ferdinand II of "Inner Austria" as successor, having served as his regent between 1593 and 1595, before taking over "Upper Austria". The conflicts weakened the Habsburgs relative to both the estates and the Protestant interests. Mathias moved the capital back to Vienna from Prague and bought further peace from Turkey, by a treaty in 1615. Meanwhile, religious fervor in the empire was mounting, and even Klesl by now Bishop of Vienna (1614) and Cardinal (1615) was considered too moderate by extremist Catholics, including Ferdinand II. War was in the air, and the assault on two roral officials in Prague on 23 May 1618 (The Defenestration of Prague) was to spark all out war. Mathias, like his brother Rudolf, became increasingly isolated by Ferdinand who had imprisoned Klesl.

The next brother in line for succession in 1619 was Albert VII, but he was persuaded to step down in favour of Ferdinand II within a few months.

=== Reformation and Counter-Reformation ===
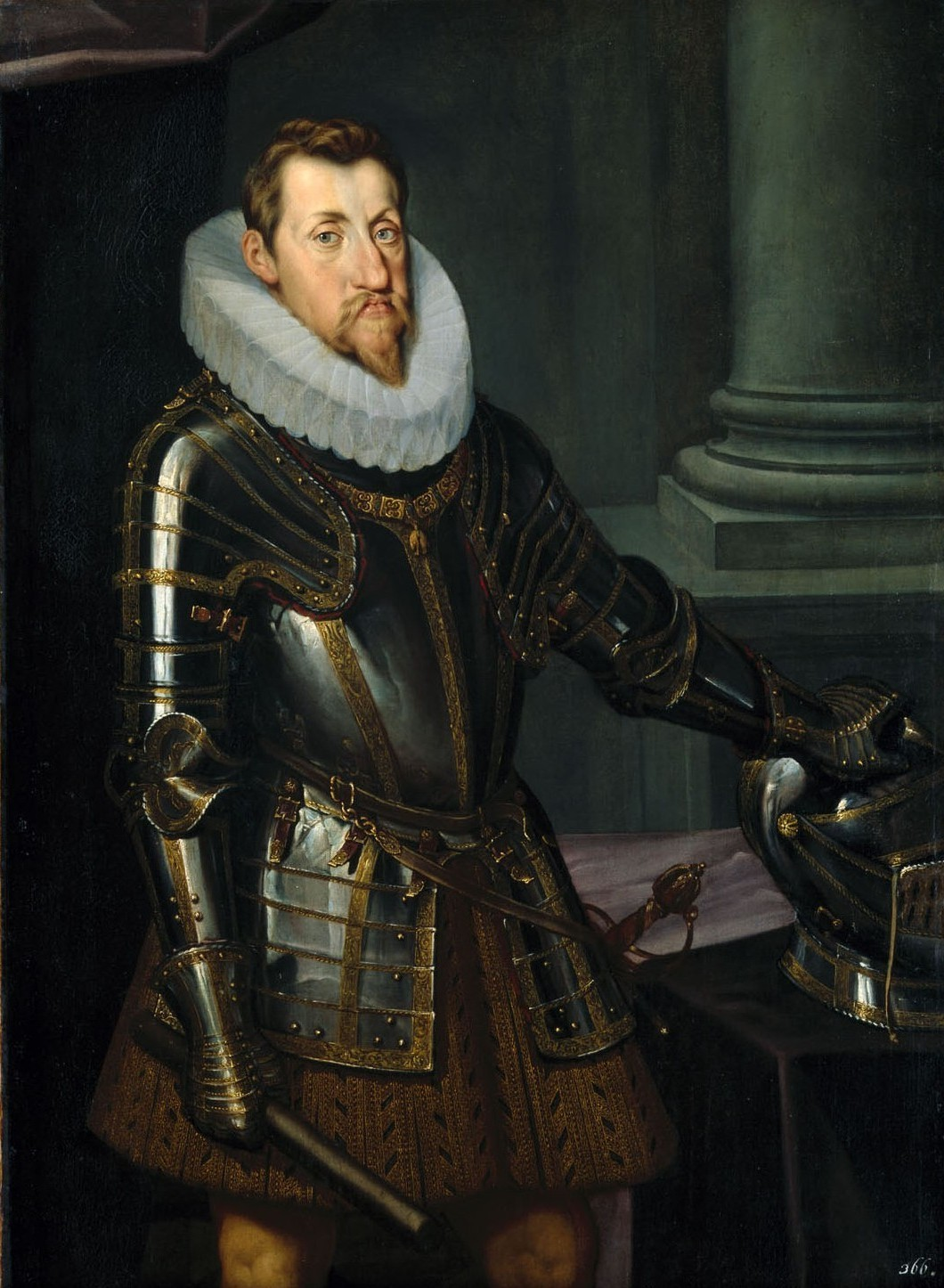
Archduke Ferdinand II 1619–1637, architect of Counter-Reformation

Religion played a large part in the politics of this period, and even tolerance had its limits faced with the incompatible demands of both camps. As the Archduke closest to the Turkish threat, Maximilian II was to continue his father's policy of tolerance and reconciliation, granting Assekuration (legalisation of Protestantism for the nobles) in 1571, as did Charles II with Religionspazifikation in 1572, while in distant Tyrol, Ferdinand II could afford to be more aggressive. Maximilian II's policies were continued by his sons, Rudolf V and Mathias. The strength of the Reformation in Upper Austria was blunted by internal schisms, while in Lower Austria Melchior Khlesl led a vigorous Catholic response, expelling Protestant preachers and promoting reconversion. A further concession by Charles II in 1578, the Brucker Pazifikation, met with more resistance.

The Catholic Revival started in earnest in 1595 when Ferdinand II, who was Jesuit-educated came of age. He had succeeded his father, Charles II in Inner Austria in 1590 and was energetic in suppressing heresy in the provinces which he ruled. Reformation Commissions initiated a process of forced recatholicisation and by 1600 was being imposed on Graz and Klagenfurt. Unlike previous Austrian rulers, Ferdinand II was unconcerned about the effect of religious conflict on the ability to withstand the Ottomans. The Counter-Reformation was to continue to the end of the Thirty Year War in 1648.

== Austria and the Thirty Years' War (1618–1648) ==
=== Ferdinand II (1619–1637) and Habsburg over-reach ===
When the ultra-pious and intransigent Ferdinand II (1619–1637) was elected Emperor (as Ferdinand II) in 1619 to succeed his cousin Mathias, he embarked on an energetic attempt to re-Catholicize not only the Hereditary Provinces, but Bohemia and Habsburg Hungary as well as most of Protestant Europe within the Holy Roman Empire.

Outside his lands, Ferdinand II's reputation for strong headed uncompromising intolerance had triggered the religious Thirty Years' War in May 1618 in the polarizing first phase, known as the Revolt in Bohemia. Once the Bohemian Revolt had been put down in 1620, he embarked on a concerted effort to eliminate Protestantism in Bohemia and Austria, which was largely successful as was his efforts to reduce the power of the Diet. The religious suppression of the Counter-Reformation reached its height in 1627 with the Provincial Ordinance.

After several initial reverses, Ferdinand II had become more accommodating but as the Catholics turned things around and began to enjoy a long string of successes at arms he set forth the Edict of Restitution in 1629 in an attempt to restore the status quo of 1555 (Peace of Augsburg), vastly complicating the politics of settlement negotiations and prolonging the rest of the war. Encouraged by the mid-war successes, Ferdinand II became even more forceful, leading to infamies by his armies such as the Frankenburg Lottery (Frankenburger Würfelspiel) (1625), suppression of the consequent Peasants' Revolt of 1626, and the Sack of Magdeburg (1631) Despite concluding the Peace of Prague (1635) with Saxony, and hence the internal, or civil, war with the Protestants, the war would drag on due to the intervention of many foreign states.

=== Ferdinand III and the peace process (1637–1648) ===
By the time of Ferdinand II's death in 1637, the war was progressing disastrously for the Habsburgs, and his son Ferdinand III (1637–1657) who had been one of his military commanders was faced with the task of salvaging the consequences of his father's extremism. Ferdinand III was far more pragmatic and had been considered the leader of the peace party at court and had helped negotiate the Peace of Prague in 1635. However, with continuing losses in the war he was forced to make peace in 1648 with the Peace of Westphalia, concluding the war. One of his acts during the latter part of the war was to give further independence to the German states (ius belli ac pacis—rights in time of war and peace) which would gradually change the balance of power between emperor and states in favour of the latter.

=== Assessment ===
While its ultimate causes prove to be elusive, the war was to prove a roller-coaster as Habsburg over-reach led to it spreading from a domestic dispute to involve most of Europe, and which while at times appearing to aid the Habsburg goal of political hegemony and religious conformity, ultimately eluded them except in their own central territories.

The forced conversions or evictions carried out in the midst of the Thirty Years' War, together with the later general success of the Protestants, had greatly negative consequences for Habsburg control of the Holy Roman Empire itself. Although territorial losses were relatively small for the Habsburgs, the Empire was greatly diminished, the power of the ruler reduced and the balance of power in Europe changed with new centres emerging on the empire's borders. The estates were now to function more like nation states.

While deprived of the goal of universal monarchy, the campaigns within the Habsburg hereditary lands were relatively successful in religiously purification, although Hungary was never successfully re-Catholicized. Only in Lower Austria, and only among the nobility, was Protestantism tolerated. Large numbers of people either emigrated or converted, while others compromised as crypto-Protestants, ensuing relative conformity. The crushing of the Bohemian Revolt also extinguished Czech culture and established German as the tool of Habsburg absolutism. The Austrian monarchs thereafter had much greater control within the hereditary power base, the dynastic absolutism grip was tightened and the power of the estates diminished. On the other hand, Austria suffered demographically and financially, therefore becoming less vigorous as a nation-state.

The Baroque Austrian Monarchy was established. Despite the dichotomy between outward reality and inner conviction, the rest of the world saw Austria as the epitome of forcible conformity, and conflation of church and state.

=== Impact of war ===
In terms of human costs, the Thirty Years' War's many economic, social, and population dislocations caused by the hardline methods adopted by Ferdinand II's strict counter-reformation measures and almost continual employment of mercenary field armies contributed significantly to the loss of life and tragic depopulation of all the German states, during a war which some estimates put the civilian loss of life as high as 50% overall. Studies mostly cite the causes of death due to starvation or as caused (ultimately by the lack-of-food induced) weakening of resistance to endemic diseases which repeatedly reached epidemic proportions among the general Central European population—the German states were the battle ground and staging areas for the largest mercenary armies theretofore, and the armies foraged among the many provinces stealing the food of those people forced onto the roads as refugees, or still on the lands, regardless of their faith and allegiances. Both townsmen and farmers were repeatedly ravaged and victimized by the armies on both sides leaving little for the populations already stressed by the refugees from the war or fleeing the Catholic counter-reformation repressions under Ferdinand's governance.

=== Dynastic succession and redivision of the lands ===
The Austrian lands finally came under one archduchy in 1620, but Ferdinand II quickly redivided them in 1623 in the Habsburg tradition by parcelling out "Upper Austria" (Further Austria and Tirol) to his younger brother Leopold V (1623–1632) who was already governor there. Upper Austria would remain under Leopold's successors till 1665 when it reverted to the senior line under Leopold I.

Leopold V's son Ferdinand Charles succeeded him in Upper Austria in 1632. However he was only four at the time, leaving his mother Claudia de' Medici as regent till 1646.

== Establishing the monarchy: Austria's rise to power (1648–1740) ==
Despite the setbacks of the Thirty Years' War, Austria was able to recover economically and demographically and consolidate the new hegemony often referred to as Austrian Baroque. By 1714 Austria had become a great power again. Yet the roots of Habsburg legitimacy, with its reliance on religious and political conformity, was to make it increasingly anachronistic in the Age of Enlightenment. Nevertheless, in the arts and architecture the baroque flourished in Austria. In peacetime Ferdinand III (1637–1657) proved to be a great patron of the arts and a musician.

Upon Ferdinand's death in 1657 he was succeeded by his son Leopold I (1657–1705), whose reign was relatively long. Meanwhile, in "Upper Austria" Ferdinand Charles (1632–1662) although also an arts patron ruled in an absolutist and extravagant style. His brother Sigismund Francis (1662–1665) succeeded him briefly in 1662, but dying without heir in 1665 his lands reverted to Leopold I. Thus from 1665 Austria was finally reunited under one archduchy.

=== Leopold I (1657–1705): Final unification and liberation from Ottoman Empire ===
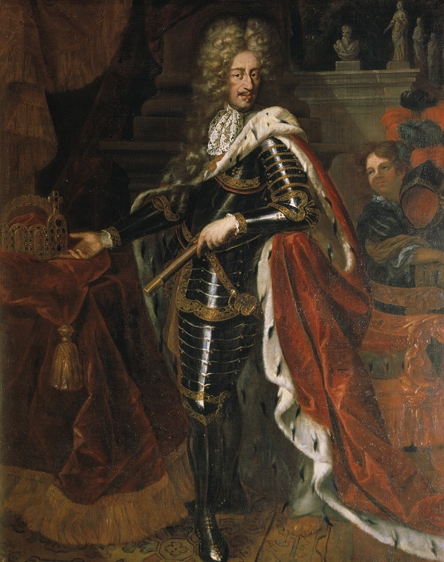
Leopold I, 1657–1705.

Leopold I's reign was marked by a return to a succession of wars. Even before he succeeded his father in 1657, he was involved in the Second Northern War (1655–1660) a carry over from Sweden's involvement in the Thirty Years' War, in which Austria sided with Poland, defeating Transylvania, a Swedish ally and Ottoman protectorate.

At the end of that war the Ottomans overran Nagyvárad in Transylvania in 1660, which would mark the beginning of the decline of that principality and increasing Habsburg influence. In vain the Transylvanians appealed to Vienna for help, unaware of secret Ottoman-Habsburg agreements.

Fortunately for Austria, Turkey was preoccupied elsewhere during the Thirty Years' War when she would have been vulnerable to attack on her eastern flanks. It was not until 1663 that the Turks developed serious intentions with regard to Austria, which let to a disastrous event for the Ottoman army, being defeated at the Battle of Saint Gotthard the following year.

The terms, dictated by the need to deal with the French in the west, were so disadvantageous that they infuriated the Hungarians who revolted. To make matters worse, after executing the leaders, Leopold attempted to impose a counter-reformation, starting a religious civil war, although he made some concessions in 1681. Thus by the early 1680s Leopold was facing Hungarian revolt, backed by the Ottomans and encouraged by the French on the opposite flank.

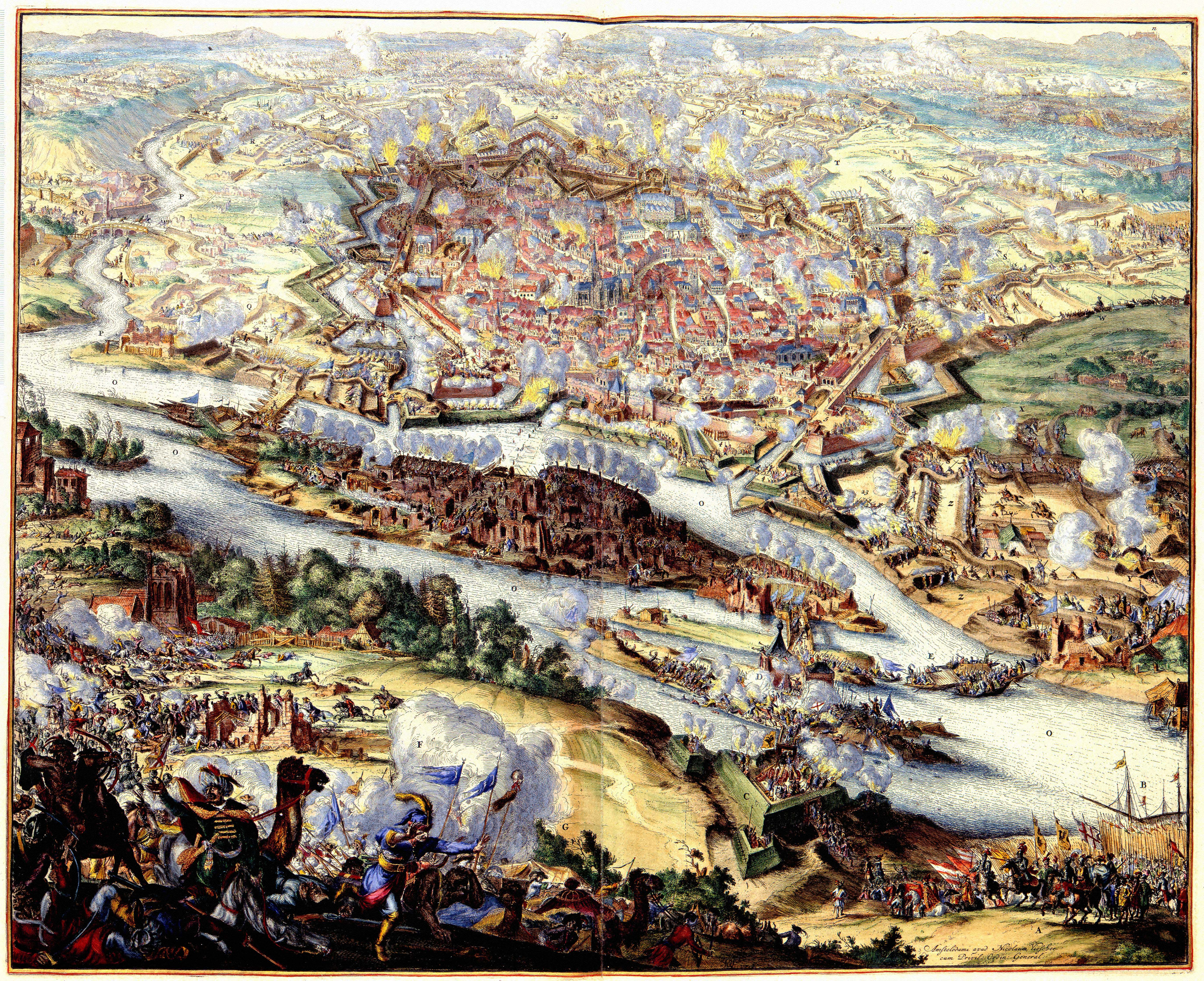
The Battle of Vienna, 1683.

Meanwhile, Austria became involved elsewhere with the Franco-Dutch War (1672–1678) which was concluded with the Treaties of Nijmegen giving the French considerable opportunities, indeed the activities of the French, now also a major power, distracted Leopold from following up his advantage with the Turks, and Austro-Ottoman relationships were governed by the Peace of Vasvár which would grant some twenty years relief. However the reunions bought a badly needed French neutrality while Austria kept watch to the east. The Ottomans next moved against Austria in 1682 in retaliation against Habsburg raids, reaching Vienna in 1683, which proved well fortified, and set about besieging it. The allied forces eventually proved superior and the lifting of the siege was followed by a series of victories in 1686, 1687 and 1697, resulting in the Treaty of Karlowitz (1699), Belgrade having fallen in 1688 (but recaptured in 1690). This provided Austrian hegemony over southern Central Europe and introduced a large number of Serbs into the Empire, who were to have a major impact on policies over the ensuing centuries.

With the eastern frontier now finally secured, Vienna could flourish and expand beyond its traditional limits. In the east Leopold was learning that there was little to be gained by harsh measures, which policy bought his acceptance and he granted the Hungarian diet rights through the Diploma Leopoldianum of 1691. However, on the military front, this merely freed up Austria to engage in further western European wars. Austria was becoming more involved in competition with France in Western Europe, fighting the French in the War of the League of Augsburg (1688–1697).

On the domestic front, Leopold's reign was marked by the expulsion of the Jews from Vienna in 1670, the area being renamed Leopoldstadt. While in 1680 Leopold adopted the so-called Pragmatica, which re-regulated the relationship between landlord and peasant.

=== War of Spanish Succession (1701–1714): Joseph I and Charles III ===
Most complex of all was the War of the Spanish Succession (1701–1714), in which the French and Austrians (along with their British, Dutch and Catalan allies) fought over the inheritance of the vast territories of the Spanish Habsburgs. The ostensible cause was the future Charles III of Austria (1711–1740) claiming the vacant Spanish throne in 1701. Leopold engaged in the war but did not live to see its outcome, being succeeded by his Joseph I in 1705. Joseph's reign was short and the war finally came to an end in 1714 by which time his brother Charles III had succeeded him.

Although the French secured control of Spain and its colonies for a grandson of Louis XIV, the Austrians also ended up making significant gains in Western Europe, including the former Spanish Netherlands (now called the Austrian Netherlands, including most of modern Belgium), the Duchy of Milan in Northern Italy, and Naples and Sardinia in Southern Italy. (The latter was traded for Sicily in 1720). By the conclusion of the war in 1714 Austria had achieved a pivotal position in European power politics.

The end of the war saw Austria's allies desert her in terms of concluding treaties with the French, Charles finally signing off in the Treaty of Rastatt in 1714. While the Habsburgs may not have gained all they wanted, they still made significant gains through both Rastatt and Karlowitz, and established their power. The remainder of his reign saw Austria relinquish many of these fairly impressive gains, largely due to Charles's apprehensions at the imminent extinction of the House of Habsburg.

=== Charles III: Succession and the Pragmatic Sanction (1713–1740) ===
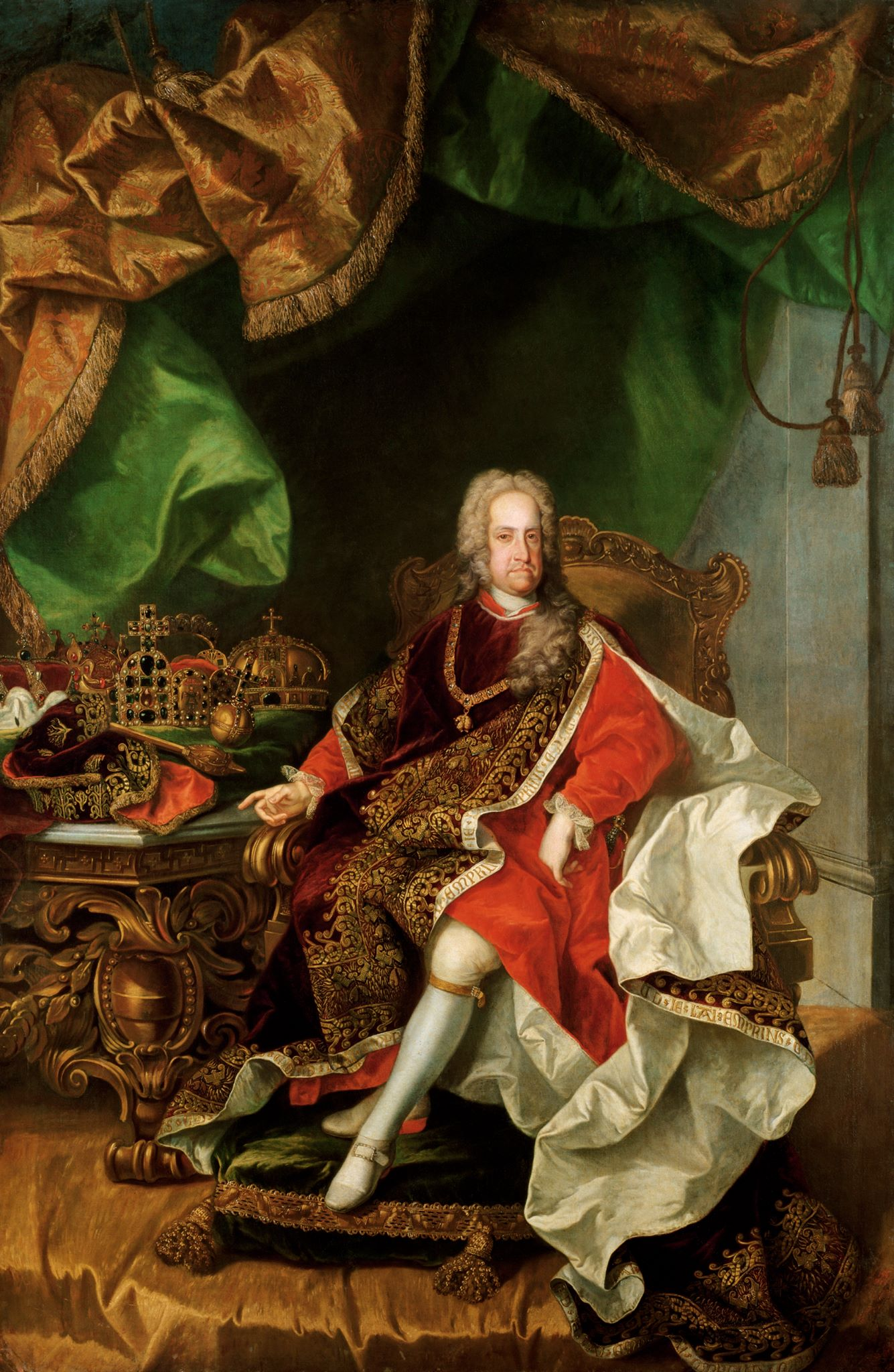
Charles III, 1713–1740

For Charles now had succession problems of his own, having only two surviving daughters. His solution was to abolish sole male inheritance by means of the Pragmatic Sanction of 1713. In 1703 his father Leopold VI had made a pact with his sons that allowed for female inheritance but was vague on details, and left room for uncertainty. The Pragmatic Sanction strengthened this and in addition made provision for the inseparability of the Habsburg lands.

This was to form the legal basis for the union with Hungary and to legitimise the Habsburg monarchy. It would be confirmed by the Austro-Hungarian Compromise of 1867 and would last to 1918. He then needed to strengthen the arrangement by negotiating with surrounding states. Internal negotiation proved to be relatively simple and it became law by 1723.

Charles was now willing to offer concrete advantages in territory and authority in exchange for other powers' worthless recognitions of the Pragmatic Sanction that made his daughter Maria Theresa his heir. Equally challenging was the question of the heir apparent's marital prospects and how they might influence the European balance of power. The eventual choice of Francis Stephen of Lorraine in 1736 proved unpopular with the other powers, particularly France.

War continued to be part of European life in the early 18th century. Austria was involved in the War of the Quadruple Alliance and the resulting 1720 Treaty of The Hague was to see the Habsburg lands reach their greatest territorial expansion. War with France had broken out again in 1733 with the War of the Polish Succession whose settlement at the Treaty of Vienna in 1738 saw Austria cede Naples and Sicily to the Spanish Infante Don Carlos in exchange for the tiny Duchy of Parma and Spain and France's adherence to the Pragmatic Sanction. The later years of Charles's reign also saw further wars against the Turks, beginning with a successful skirmish in 1716–1718, culminating in the Treaty of Passarowitz. Less successful was the war of 1737–1739 which resulted in the Austrian loss of Belgrade and other border territories at the Treaty of Belgrade.

On the domestic front military and political gains were accompanied by economic expansion and repopulation, as Austria entered the period of High Baroque with a profusion of new buildings, including the Belvedere (1712–1783) and Karlskirche (1716–1737), exemplified by the great architects of the period, such as Fischer, Hildebrandt and Prandtauer. However the Habsburgs' finances were fragile. They had relied on Jewish bankers such as Samuel Oppenheimer to finance their wars, and subsequently bankrupted him. However the financial system in Austria remained antiquated and inadequate. By the time of Charles' death in 1740 the treasury was almost depleted.

Religious intolerance in Austria, once unquestioned in the Erblande and the neighbouring catholic territories became the subject of more intense scrutiny by 1731 when 22,000 suspected crypto-Protestants were expelled from Salzburg and the Salzkammergut by the Prince-Archbishop of Salzburg. Similar intolerance was displayed to the Jewish population in Bohemia and surrounding areas under the Familianten in 1726 and 1727. Worse would have followed had there not also been a realisation that there were economic consequences and that some accommodation was required to the more rationalist ideas of western Europe. Among these was cameralism which encouraged economic self-sufficiency in the nation state. Thus domestic industries such as the Linzer Wollzeugfabrik were founded and encouraged, but often such ideas were subjugated by vested interests such as aristocracy and church. Rationalist emphasis on the natural and popular were the antithesis of Habsburg elitism and divine authority. Eventually external powers forced rationalism on Austria.

By the time of his death in 1740, Charles III had secured the acceptance of the Pragmatic Sanction by most of the European powers. The remaining question was whether it was realistic in the complicated power games of European dynasties.

== Maria Theresa and reform (1740–1780) ==
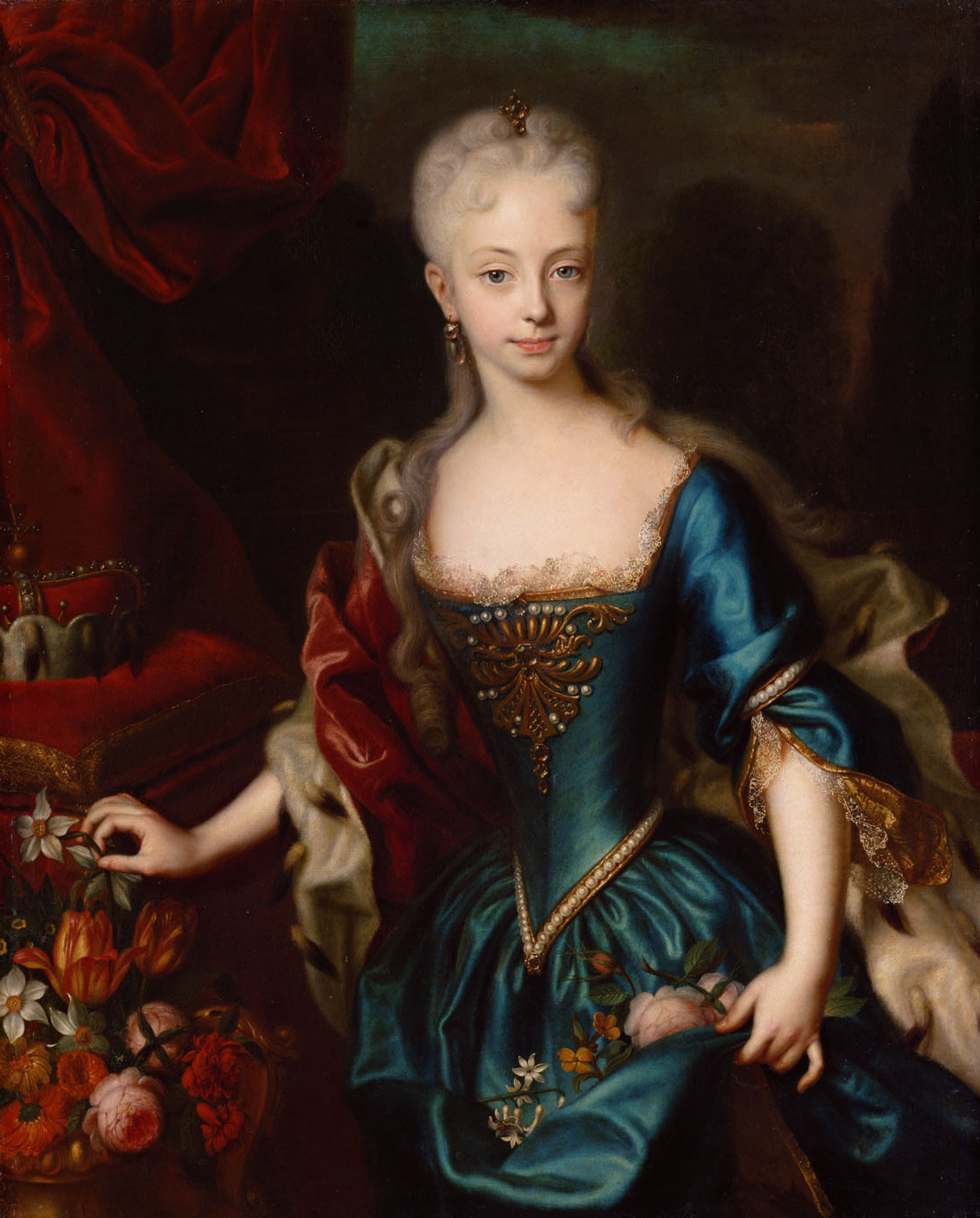
Maria Theresa as a young woman in 1727.

Charles III died on 20 October 1740, and was succeeded by his daughter Maria Theresa. However she did not become Empress immediately, that title passing to Charles VII (1742–1745) the only moment in which the imperial crown passed outside of the Habsburg line from 1440 to 1806, Charles VII being one of many who repudiated the 1713 Pragmatic Sanction. As many had anticipated all those assurances from the other powers proved of little worth to Maria Theresa.

=== War of Austrian Succession (1740–1748) ===
On 16 December 1740 Prussian troops invaded Silesia under King Frederick the Great. This was the first of three Silesian Wars fought between Austria and Prussia in this period (1740–1742, 1744–1745 and 1756–1763). Soon other powers began to exploit Austria's weakness. Charles VII claimed the inheritance to the hereditary lands and Bohemia, and was supported by the King of France, who desired the Austrian Netherlands. The Spanish and Sardinians hoped to gain territory in Italy, and the Saxons hoped to gain territory to connect Saxony with the Elector's Polish Kingdom. France even went so far as to prepare for a partition of Austria.

Austria's allies, Britain, the Dutch Republic, and Russia, were all wary of getting involved in the conflict; ultimately, only Britain provided significant support. Thus began the War of the Austrian Succession (1740–1748), one of the more confusing and less eventful wars of European history, which ultimately saw Austria holding its own, despite the permanent loss of most of Silesia to the Prussians. That represented the loss of one of its richest and most industrialised provinces. For Austria the War of Succession was more a series of wars, the first concluding in 1742 with the Treaty of Breslau, the second (1744–1745) with the Treaty of Dresden. The overall war however continued until the Treaty of Aix-la-Chapelle (1748).

In 1745, following the reign of the Bavarian Elector as Emperor Charles VII, Maria Theresa's husband Francis of Lorraine, Grand Duke of Tuscany, was elected Emperor, restoring control of that position to the Habsburgs (or, rather, to the new composite house of Habsburg-Lorraine), Francis holding the titular crown until his death in 1765, but his empress consort Maria Theresa carrying out the executive functions. The Pragmatic Sanction of 1713 applied to the hereditary possessions of the Habsburgs and Archduchy of Austria but not the position of Holy Roman Emperor, which could not be held by women, thus Maria Theresa was Empress Consort not Empress Regnant.

=== Seven Years' War and Third Silesian War (1756–1763) ===
For the eight years following the Treaty of Aix-la-Chapelle that ended the War of the Austrian Succession, Maria Theresa plotted revenge on the Prussians. The British and Dutch allies who had proved so reluctant to help her in her time of need were dropped in favour of the French in the so-called Reversal of Alliances of 1756, under the advice of Kaunitz, Austrian Chancellor (1753–1793). This resulted in the Treaty of Versailles of 1756. That same year, war once again erupted on the continent as Frederick, fearing encirclement, launched a pre-emptive invasion of Saxony and the defensive treaty became offensive. The ensuing Third Silesian War (1756–1763, part of the larger Seven Years' War) was indecisive, and its end saw Prussia holding onto Silesia, despite Russia, France, and Austria all combining against him, and with only Hanover as a significant ally on land.

The end of the war saw Austria, poorly prepared at its start, exhausted. Austria continued the alliance with France (cemented in 1770 with the marriage of Maria Theresa's daughter Archduchess Maria Antonia to the Dauphin), but also facing a dangerous situation in Central Europe, faced with the alliance of Frederick the Great of Prussia and Catherine the Great of Russia. The Russo-Turkish War of 1768–1774 caused a serious crisis in east-central Europe, with Prussia and Austria demanding compensation for Russia's gains in the Balkans, ultimately leading to the First Partition of Poland in 1772, in which Maria Theresa took Galicia from Austria's traditional ally.

=== War of Bavarian Succession (1778–1779) ===
Over the next several years, Austro-Russian relations began to improve. When the War of Bavarian Succession (1778–1779) erupted between Austria and Prussia following the extinction of the Bavarian line of the Wittelsbach dynasty, Russia refused to support Austria, its ally from the Seven Years' War, but offered to mediate and the war was ended, after almost no bloodshed, on 13 May 1779, when Russian and French mediators at the Congress of Teschen negotiated an end to the war. In the agreement Austria received the Innviertel from Bavaria, but for Austria it was a case of status quo ante bellum. This war was unusual for this era in that casualties from disease and starvation exceeded wounds, and is considered the last of the Cabinet wars in which diplomats played as large a part as troops, and as the roots of German Dualism (Austria–Prussia rivalry).

=== Reform ===
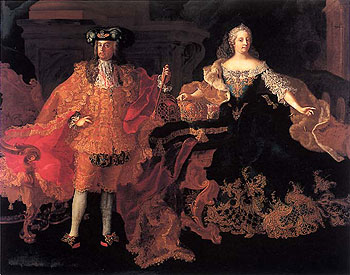
Francis I (1740–1765) with Maria Theresa (1740–1780).

Although Maria Theresa and her consort were Baroque absolutist conservatives, this was tempered by a pragmatic sense and they implemented a number of overdue reforms. Thus these reforms were pragmatic responses to the challenges faced by archduchy and empire, not ideologically framed in the Age of Enlightenment as seen by her successor, Joseph II.

The collision with other theories of nation states and modernity obliged Austria to perform a delicate balancing act between accepting changing economic and social circumstances while rejecting their accompanying political change. The relative failure to deal with modernity produced major changes in Habsburg power and Austrian culture and society. One of the first challenges that Maria Theresa and her advisers faced was to restore the legitimacy and authority of the dynasty, although was slowly replaced by a need to establish the needs of State.

==== Governance and finance ====
Maria Theresa promulgated financial and educational reforms, with the assistance of her advisers, notably Count Friedrich Wilhelm von Haugwitz and Gerard van Swieten. Many reforms were in the interests of efficiency. Her financial reforms considerably improved the state finances, and notably introduced taxation of the nobility for the first time, and achieved a balanced budget by 1775. At an administrative level, under Haugwitz she centralised administration, previously left to the nobility and church, along Prussian models with a permanent civil service. Haugwitz was appointed head of the new Directorium in publicis und cameralibus in 1749. By 1760 it was clear this was not solving Austria's problems and further reform was required. Kaunitz' proposal for a consultative body was accepted by Maria Theresa. This Council of State was to be based on the French Conseil d'État which believed that an absolutist monarch could still be guided by Enlightenment advisors. The council was inaugurated in January 1761, composed of Kaunitz the state chancellor, three members of the high nobility, including von Haugwitz as chair, and three knights, which served as a committee of experienced people who advised her. The council of state lacked executive or legislative authority. This marked Kaunitz' ascendency over von Haugwitz. The Directory was abolished and its functions absorbed into the new united Austrian and Bohemian chancelleries (Böhmisch-Österreichische Hofkanzlei) in 1761.

==== Education ====
While Von Haugwitz modernised the army and government, van Swieten reformed health care and education. Educational reform included that of Vienna University by Swieten from 1749, the founding of the Theresianum (1746) as a civil service academy as well as military and foreign service academies. An Education Commission was established in 1760 with a specific interest in replacing Jesuitical control, but it was the papal dissolution of the order in 1773 that accomplished this. The confiscation of their property enabled the next step. Aware of the inadequacy of bureaucracy in Austria and, in order to improve it, Maria Theresa and what was now referred to as the Party of Enlightenment radically overhauled the schools system. In the new system, based on the Prussian one, all children of both genders from the ages of 6 to 12 had to attend school, while teacher training schools were established. Education reform was met with hostility from many villages and the nobility to whom children represented labour. Maria Theresa crushed the dissent by ordering the arrest of all those opposed. Although the idea had merit, the reforms were not as successful as they were expected to be; in some parts of Austria, half of the population was illiterate well into the 19th century. However widespread access to education, education in the vernacular language, replacement of rote learning and blind obedience with reasoning was to have a profound effect on the relationship between people and state.

==== Civil rights, industry and labour relations ====
Other reforms were in civil rights which were defied under the Codex Theresianus, begun in 1752 and finished in 1766. Specific measures included abolition of torture, and witch burning. Also in industrial and agrarian policy along cameralist lines, the theory was to maximise the resources of the land to protect the integrity of the state. Widespread problems arising from war, famine unrest and abuse made implementation of landlord-peasant reforms both reasonable and reasonable. Maria Theresa and her regime had sought a new more direct link with the populace, now that administration was no longer to be farmed out, and this maternalism combined with cameralist thinking required taking a closer interest in the welfare of the peasantry and their protection, which transpired in the 1750s. However these had been more noted than observed. In the 1770s more meaningful control of rents became practical, further eroding privilege.

While reforms assisted Austria in dealing with the almost constant wars, the wars themselves hindered the implementation of those reforms.

=== Religion ===
A pious Catholic, her reforms which affected the relation between state and church in favour of the former, did not extend to any relaxation of religious intolerance, but she preempted Pope Clement XIV's suppression of the Jesuits in 1773 by issuing a decree which removed them from all the institutions of the monarchy. There was both a suspicion of their excesses and of their tendency to political interference which brought them into conflict with the progressive secularisation of culture. Thus they were removed from control of censorship in 1751, and the educational reforms threatened their control over education. She was hostile to Jews and Protestants but eventually abandoned efforts for conversion, but continued her father's campaign to exile crypto-Protestants (mainly to Transylvania as in 1750). In 1744 she even ordered the expulsion of Jews, but relented under pressure by 1748. In her later years though she took some measures to protect the Jewish population.

=== Succession and co-regency ===
Maria Theresa had a large family, sixteen in all, of whom six were daughters that lived to adulthood. They were only too aware that their fate was to be used as political pawns. The best known of these was the tragic figure of Maria Antonia (1755–1793).

When Maria Theresa's consort Francis died in 1765, he was succeeded by his son Joseph II as emperor (1765–1790) because of male primogeniture. Joseph was also made co-ruler or co-regent with his mother. Joseph, 24 at the time, was more ideologically attuned to modernity and frequently disagreed with his mother on policy, and was often excluded from policy making. Maria Theresa always acted with a cautious respect for the conservatism of the political and social elites and the strength of local traditions. Her cautious approach repelled Joseph, who always sought the decisive, dramatic intervention to impose the one best solution, regardless of traditions or political opposition. Joseph and his mother's quarrels were usually mediated by Chancellor Wenzel Anton von Kaunitz who served for nearly 40 years as the principal minister to both Maria Theresa and Joseph.

Joseph frequently used his position as leverage, by threatening resignation. The one area he was allowed more say on was in foreign policy. In this, he showed similar traits to Austria's arch-enemy Frederick the Great of Prussia (1740–1786), also his intellectual model. He was successful in siding with Kaunitz in Realpolitik, undertaking the first partition of Poland in 1772 over his mother's principled objections. However his enthusiasm for interfering in Bavarian politics by invoking his ties to his former brother in law, Maximilian III, ended Austria in the War of Bavarian Succession in 1778. Although largely shut out of domestic policy, he used his time to acquire knowledge of his lands and people, encouraged policies he was in accord with and made magnanimous gestures such as opening the Royal Parks of Prater and Augarten to the public in 1766 and 1775 (Alles für das Volk, nichts durch das Volk—Everything for the people, nothing by the people).

On her husband's death Maria Theresa was therefore no longer empress, the title of which fell to her daughter-in-law Maria Josepha of Bavaria until her death in 1767 when the title fell vacant. When Maria Theresa died in 1780 she was succeeded in all her titles by Joseph II.

== The Habsburg-Lorraine Dynasty: Joseph II and Leopold VII (1780–1792) ==
=== Joseph II (1780–1790): Josephinism and enlightened despotism ===
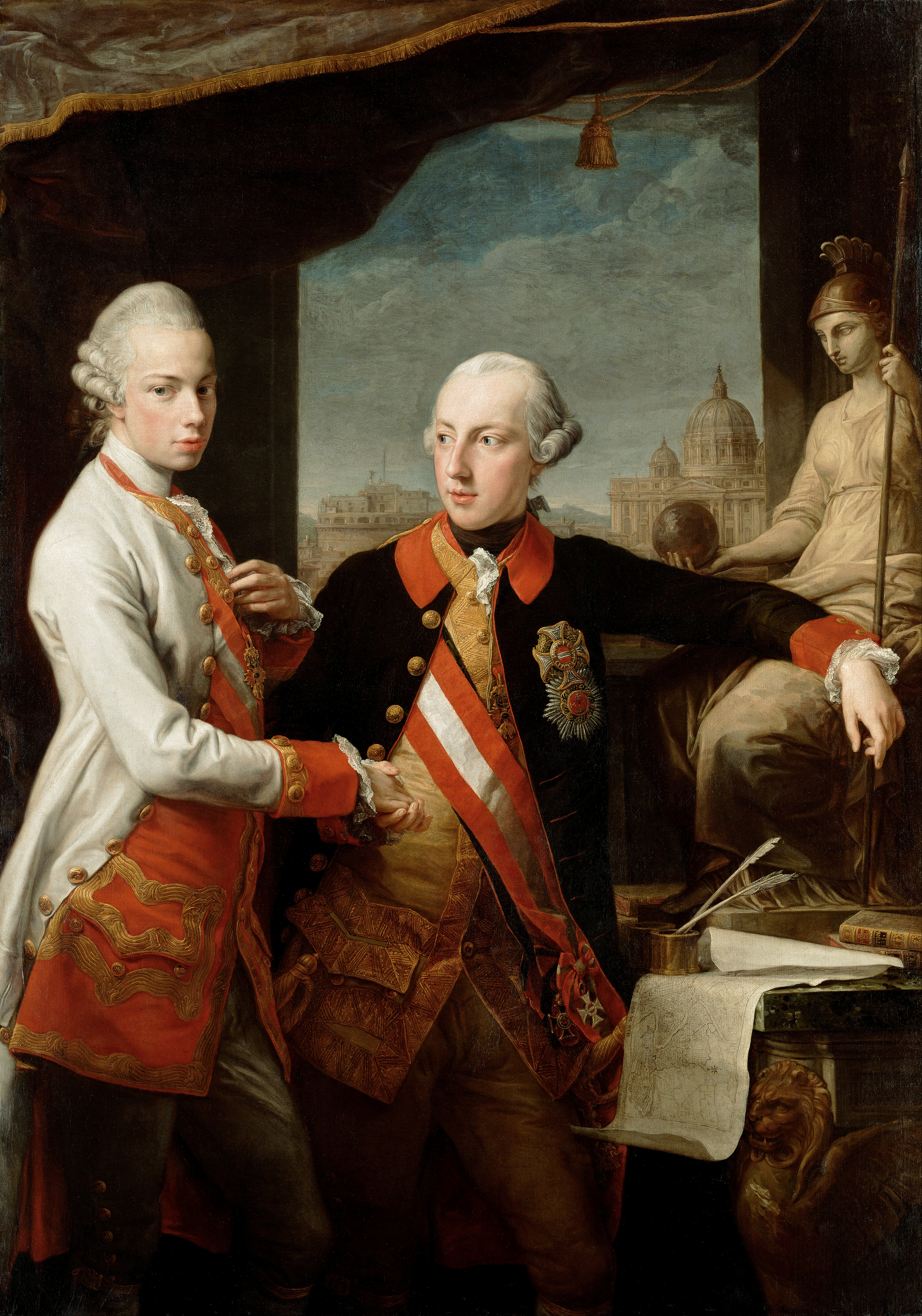
Emperor Joseph II and Grand Duke Pietro Leopoldo of Tuscany by Pompeo Batoni, 1769. Joseph II (right) with his brother and successor Leopold VII (left)

As the first of the Habsburg-Lorraine (Habsburg-Lothringen) Dynasty Joseph II was the archetypical embodiment of The Enlightenment spirit of the 18th century reforming monarchs known as the "enlightened despots". When his mother Maria Theresa died in 1780, Joseph became the absolute ruler over the most extensive realm of Central Europe. There was no parliament to deal with. Joseph was always positive that the rule of reason, as propounded in the Enlightenment, would produce the best possible results in the shortest time. He issued edicts—6,000 in all, plus 11,000 new laws designed to regulate and reorder every aspect of the empire. The spirit was benevolent and paternal. He intended to make his people happy, but strictly in accordance with his own criteria.

Josephinism (or Josephism) as his policies were called, is notable for the very wide range of reforms designed to modernize the creaky empire in an era when France and Prussia were rapidly upgrading. Josephinism elicited grudging compliance at best, and more often vehement opposition from all sectors in every part of his empire. Failure characterized most of his projects. Joseph set about building a rational, centralized, and uniform government for his diverse lands, a pyramid with himself as supreme autocrat. He expected government servants to all be dedicated agents of Josephinism and selected them without favor for class or ethnic origins; promotion was solely by merit. To impose uniformity, he made German the compulsory language of official business throughout the Empire. The Hungarian assembly was stripped of its prerogatives, and not even called together.

As President of the Court Audit Office, Count Karl von Zinzendorf (1781–1792) introduced Appalt, a uniform system of accounting for state revenues, expenditures, and debts of the territories of the Austrian crown. Austria was more successful than France in meeting regular expenditures and in gaining credit. However, the events of Joseph II's last years also suggest that the government was financially vulnerable to the European wars that ensued after 1792. Joseph reformed the traditional legal system, abolished brutal punishments and the death penalty in most instances, and imposed the principle of complete equality of treatment for all offenders. He ended censorship of the press and theatre.

To equalize the incidence of taxation, Joseph ordered a fresh appraisal of the value of all properties in the empire; his goal was to impose a single and egalitarian tax on land. The goal was to modernize the relationship of dependence between the landowners and peasantry, relieve some of the tax burden on the peasantry, and increase state revenues. Joseph looked on the tax and land reforms as being interconnected and strove to implement them at the same time. The various commissions he established to formulate and carry out the reforms met resistance among the nobility, the peasantry, and some officials. Most of the reforms were abrogated shortly before or after Joseph's death in 1790; they were doomed to failure from the start because they tried to change too much in too short a time, and tried to radically alter the traditional customs and relationships that the villagers had long depended upon.

In the cities the new economic principles of the Enlightenment called for the destruction of the autonomous guilds, already weakened during the age of mercantilism. Joseph II's tax reforms and the institution of Katastralgemeinde (tax districts for the large estates) served this purpose, and new factory privileges ended guild rights while customs laws aimed at economic unity. The intellectual influence of the Physiocrats led to the inclusion of agriculture in these reforms.

==== Civil and criminal law ====
In 1781–82 he extended full legal freedom to serfs. Rentals paid by peasants were to be regulated by imperial (not local) officials and taxes were levied upon all income derived from land. The landlords saw a grave threat to their status and incomes, and eventually reversed the policy. In Hungary and Transylvania, the resistance of the landed nobility was so great that Joseph compromised with halfway measures—one of the few times he backed down. After the great peasant revolt of Horea, 1784–85, however, the emperor imposed his will by fiat. His Imperial Patent of 1785 abolished serfdom but did not give the peasants ownership of the land or freedom from dues owed to the landowning nobles. It did give them personal freedom. Emancipation of the Hungarian peasantry promoted the growth of a new class of taxable landholders, but it did not abolish the deep-seated ills of feudalism and the exploitation of the landless squatters.

Capital punishment was abolished in 1787, although restored in 1795. Legal reforms gained comprehensive "Austrian" form in the civil code (ABGB: Allgemeine Bürgerliche Gesetzbuch) of 1811 and have been seen as providing a foundation for subsequent reforms extending into the 20th century. The first part of the ABGB appeared in 1786, and the criminal code in 1787. These reforms incorporated the criminological writings of Cesare Beccaria, but also first time made all people equal in the eyes of the law.

==== Education and medicine ====
To produce a literate citizenry, elementary education was made compulsory for all boys and girls, and higher education on practical lines was offered for a select few. He created scholarships for talented poor students, and allowed the establishment of schools for Jews and other religious minorities. In 1784 he ordered that the country change its language of instruction from Latin to German, a highly controversial step in a multilingual empire.

By the 18th century, centralization was the trend in medicine because more and better educated doctors requesting improved facilities; cities lacked the budgets to fund local hospitals; and the monarchies wanted to end costly epidemics and quarantines. Joseph attempted to centralize medical care in Vienna through the construction of a single, large hospital, the famous Allgemeines Krankenhaus, which opened in 1784. Centralization worsened sanitation problems causing epidemics a 20% death rate in the new hospital, which undercut Joseph's plan, but the city became preeminent in the medical field in the next century.

==== Religion ====
Joseph's Catholicism was that of Catholic Reform and his goals were to weaken the power of the Catholic Church and introduce a policy of religious toleration that was the most advanced of any state in Europe. In 1789 he issued a charter of religious toleration for the Jews of Galicia, a region with a large, Yiddish-speaking, traditional Jewish population. The charter abolished communal autonomy whereby the Jews controlled their internal affairs; it promoted "Germanization" and the wearing of non-Jewish clothing.

Probably the most unpopular of all his reforms was his attempted modernization of the highly traditional Roman Catholic Church. Calling himself the guardian of Catholicism, Joseph II struck vigorously at papal power. He tried to make the Catholic Church in his empire the tool of the state, independent of Rome. Clergymen were deprived of the tithe and ordered to study in seminaries under government supervision, while bishops had to take a formal oath of loyalty to the crown. He financed the large increase in bishoprics, parishes, and secular clergy by extensive sales of monastic lands. As a man of the Enlightenment he ridiculed the contemplative monastic orders, which he considered unproductive, as opposed to the service orders. Accordingly, he suppressed a `` of the monasteries (over 700 were closed) and reduced the number of monks and nuns from 65,000 to 27,000. Church courts were abolished and marriage was defined as a civil contract outside the jurisdiction of the Church. Joseph sharply cut the number of holy days and reduced ornamentation in churches. He greatly simplified the manner of celebration. Critics alleged that these reforms caused a crisis of faith, reduced piety and a decline in morality, had Protestant tendencies, promoted Enlightenment rationalism and a class of liberal bourgeois officials, and led to the emergence and persistence of anti-clericalism. Many traditional Catholics were energized in opposition to the emperor.

==== Foreign policy ====
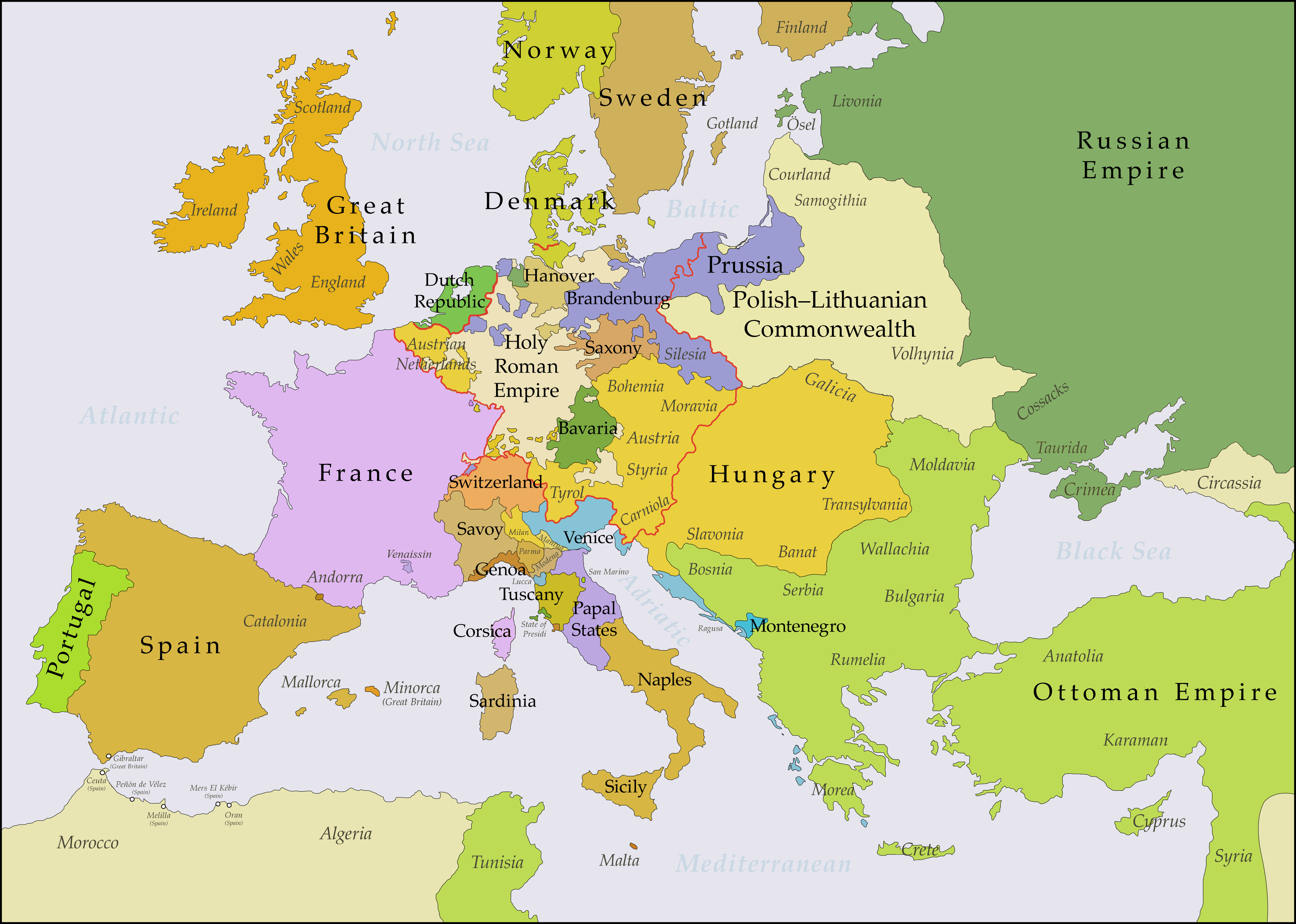
The Habsburg monarchy at the time of Joseph II's death in 1790. The red line marks the borders of the Holy Roman Empire.

The Habsburg Empire developed a policy of war and trade as well as intellectual influence across the borders. While opposing Prussia and Turkey, Austria was friendly to Russia, though tried to remove Romania from Russian influence.

In foreign policy, there was no Enlightenment, only hunger for more territory and a willingness to undertake unpopular wars to get the land. Joseph was a belligerent, expansionist leader, who dreamed of making his Empire the greatest of the European powers. Joseph's plan was to acquire Bavaria, if necessary in exchange for Belgium (the Austrian Netherlands). Thwarted by King Frederick II of Prussia in 1778 in the War of Bavarian Succession, he renewed his efforts again in 1785 but Prussian diplomacy proved more powerful. This failure caused Joseph to seek territorial expansion in the Balkans, where he became involved in an expensive and futile war with the Turks (1787–1791), which was the price to be paid for friendship with Russia.

The Balkan policy of both Maria Theresa and Joseph II reflected the Cameralism promoted by Prince Kaunitz, stressing consolidation of the border lands by reorganization and expansion of the military frontier. Transylvania had been incorporated into the frontier in 1761 and the frontier regiments became the backbone of the military order, with the regimental commander exercising military and civilian power. Populationistik was the prevailing theory of colonization, which measured prosperity in terms of labor. Joseph II also stressed economic development. Habsburg influence was an essential factor in Balkan development in the last half of the 18th century, especially for the Serbs and Croats.

==== Reaction ====
The nobility throughout his empire disliked Joseph's taxes, egalitarianism, despotism and puritanism. In Belgium and Hungary, his attempts to subordinate everything to his own personal rule in Vienna were not well received. Even commoners were affected by Joseph's reforms, such as a ban on baking gingerbread because Joseph thought it bad for the stomach, or a ban on corsets. Only a few weeks before Joseph's death, the director of the Imperial Police reported to him: "All classes, and even those who have the greatest respect for the sovereign, are discontented and indignant."

In Lombardy (in northern Italy) the cautious reforms of Maria Theresa in Lombardy had enjoyed support from local reformers. Joseph II, however, by creating a powerful imperial officialdom directed from Vienna, undercut the dominant position of the Milanese principate and the traditions of jurisdiction and administration. In the place of provincial autonomy he established an unlimited centralism, which reduced Lombardy politically and economically to a fringe area of the Empire. As a reaction to these radical changes the middle class reformers shifted away from cooperation to strong resistance. From this basis appeared the beginnings of the later Lombard liberalism.

By 1788 Joseph's health but not his determination was failing. By 1789 rebellion had broken out in protest against his reforms in Belgium (Brabant Revolution) and Hungary, and his other dominions were restive under the burdens of his war with Turkey. His empire was threatened with dissolution, and he was forced to sacrifice some of his reform projects. The emperor died on 20 February 1790 at 48, mostly unsuccessful in his attempts to curtail feudal liberties.

Behind his numerous reforms lay a comprehensive program influenced by the doctrines of enlightened absolutism, natural law, mercantilism, and physiocracy. With a goal of establishing a uniform legal framework to replace heterogeneous traditional structures, the reforms were guided at least implicitly by the principles of freedom and equality and were based on a conception of the state's central legislative authority. Joseph's accession marks a major break since the preceding reforms under Maria Theresa had not challenged these structures, but there was no similar break at the end of the Josephinian era. The reforms initiated by Joseph II had merit despite the way they were introduced. They were continued to varying degrees under his successors. They have been seen as providing a foundation for subsequent reforms extending into the 20th century.

Upon his death in 1790, Joseph was briefly succeeded by his younger brother Leopold VII.

=== Leopold II (1790–1792) ===
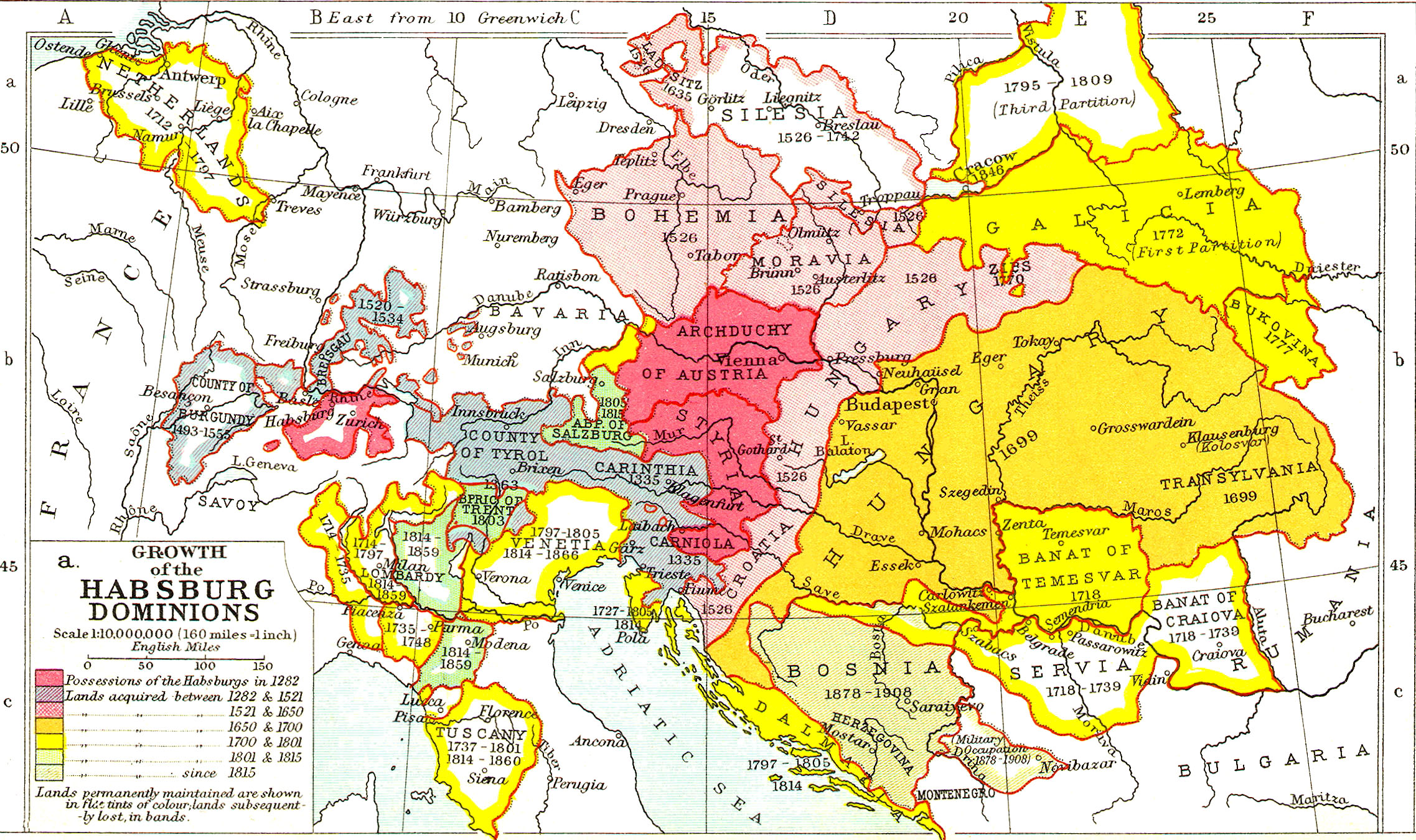
Growth of the Habsburg monarchy in central Europe

Joseph's death proved a boon for Austria, as he was succeeded by his younger brother, Leopold II, previously the more cautiously reforming Grand Duke of Tuscany. Leopold knew when to cut his losses, and soon cut deals with the revolting Netherlanders and Hungarians. He also managed to secure a peace with Turkey in 1791, and negotiated an alliance with Prussia, which had been allying with Poland to press for war on behalf of the Ottomans against Austria and Russia. While restoring relative calm to what had been a crisis situation on his accession in 1790, Austria was surrounded by potential threats. While many reforms were by necessity rescinded, other reforms were initiated including more freedom of the press and restriction on the powers of the police. He replaced his brother's police minister, Johann Anton von Pergen, with Joseph Sonnenfels an advocate of social welfare rather than control.

Leopold's reign also saw the acceleration of the French Revolution. Although Leopold was sympathetic to the revolutionaries, he was also the brother of the French queen. Furthermore, disputes involving the status of the rights of various imperial princes in Alsace, where the revolutionary French government was attempting to remove rights guaranteed by various peace treaties, involved Leopold as Emperor in conflicts with the French. The Declaration of Pillnitz, made in late 1791 jointly with the Prussian King Frederick William II and the Elector of Saxony, in which it was declared that the other princes of Europe took an interest in what was going on in France, was intended to be a statement in support of Louis XVI that would prevent the need from taking any kind of action. However, it instead inflamed the sentiments of the revolutionaries against the Emperor. Although Leopold did his best to avoid war with the French, he died in March 1792. The French declared war on his inexperienced eldest son Francis II a month later.

=== The Arts ===
Vienna and Austria dominated European music during the late 18th and early 19th centuries, typified by the First Viennese School. This was the era of Haydn, and Mozart's Vienna period extended from 1781 to 1791 during which he was court composer. Opera, particularly German opera was flourishing. Mozart wrote many German operas including the Magic Flute. Initially the pillars of the establishment—the monarchy, such as Joseph II and to a lesser extent his mother, the aristocracy and the religious establishment were the major patrons of the arts, until rising middle class aspirations incorporated music into the lives of the bourgeoisie. Meanwhile, the Baroque was evolving into the less grandiose form, the Rococo.

The virtual abolition of censorship under van Swieten also encouraged artistic expression and the themes of artistic work often reflected enlightenment thinking.

== Francis II: French Revolution and wars (1792–1815) ==
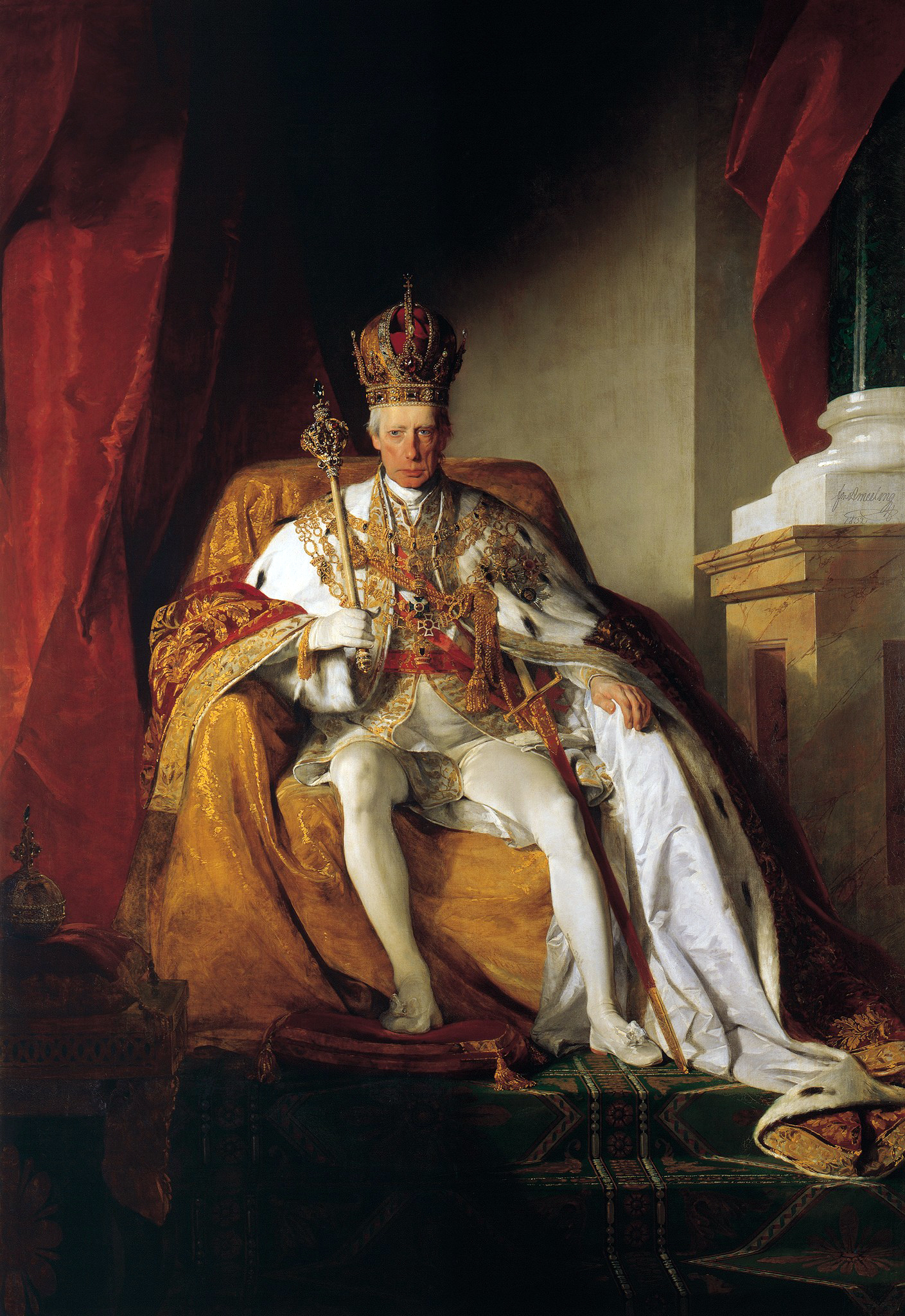
Francis II 1792–1835

Francis II (1792–1835) was only 24 when he succeeded his father Leopold VII in 1792, but was to reign for nearly half a century and a radical reorganisation of European politics. He inherited a vast bureaucracy created by his uncle whose legacy of reform and welfare was to last throughout the next two centuries. The image of the monarch had profoundly changed, as had the relationship between monarch and subject. His era was overshadowed by events in France, both in terms of the evolving Revolution and the onset of a new form of European warfare with mass citizen armies. Austria recoiled in horror at the execution of Francis' aunt Maria Antonia in 1793 (despite futile attempts at rescue and even negotiation for release), leading to a wave of repression to fend off such dangerous sentiments influencing Austrian politics. At the same time Europe was consumed by the French Revolutionary (1792–1802) and Napoleonic Wars (1803–1815). The French Revolution effectively ended Austria's experiment with modernity and reform from above, and marked a retreat to legitimacy.

=== Domestic policy ===
Francis started out cautiously. The bureaucracy was still Josephist and the legal reforms under the guidance of Sonnenfels resulting in the Criminal Code of 1803 and the Civil Code of 1811. On the other hand, he restored Pergen to his position of Chief of Police. The discovery of a Jacobin plot in 1794 was a catalyst to the onset of repression. The leaders were executed or imprisoned, but there was little evidence of a tangible threat to the Habsburgs. Suppression of dissent with the Recensorship Commission of 1803 created a void in cultural and intellectual life, yet some of the world's greatest music comes from this time (see below). There were still elements of Josephism abroad, and Stadion, the foreign minister with his propagandist Friedrich von Gentz was able to appeal to popular nationalism to defeat Napoleon.

What exactly such nationalism actually represented is difficult to precisely identify—certainly it was directed to German culture within the Habsburg lands, but it is not clear to what degree it differentiated between 'Austrian' and 'German'. Certainly many of those such nationalism appealed to were German romantics such as Karl Wilhelm Friedrich Schlegel, such that patriotism rather than true nationalism appeared to be the goal. Cultural museums were established and citizens militia established— but in the German-speaking lands.

Josephism remained alive and well in the other members of Francis' generation. Archduke Johann (1782–1859) was a nationalism advocate who was behind the Landwehr movement, and with Joseph Hormayr incited revolt in Bavarian occupied Tyrol, while Archduke Charles carried out reform of the military. A statue to Joseph was even set up in Josephsplatz in 1807 to rally the populace. In this way the Archdukes' centralism contrasted with Stadion's decentralisation and attempt to give more say to the estates. Nevertheless, such nationalism was successful in rebuilding Austria throughout its various military and political setbacks of the French wars.

Following Austria's resounding defeat in 1809, Francis blamed reform, and removed the Archdukes from their position. Stadion was replaced by Metternich, who, although a reformer, placed loyalty to the monarch above all. The Landwehr was abolished, and following the discovery of yet another planned Tyrolean uprising Hormayr and Archduke Johann were interned, and Johann exiled to Styria.

=== Revolutionary wars (1792–1802) ===
==== War of the First Coalition (1792–1797) ====
France declared war on Austria on 20 April 1792. The increasing radicalization of the French Revolution (including the execution of the king on 21 January 1793), as well as the French occupation of the Low Countries, brought Britain, the Dutch Republic, and Spain into the war, which became known as the War of the First Coalition. This first war with France, which lasted until 1797, proved unsuccessful for Austria. After some brief successes against the utterly disorganized French armies in early 1792, the tide turned, and the French overran the Austrian Netherlands in the last months of 1792. By the Battle of Valmy in September it was evident to Austria and their Prussian allies that victory against France would elude them, and Austria suffered a further defeat in November at Jemappes, losing the Austrian Netherlands (Belgium). While the Austrians were so occupied, their erstwhile Prussian allies stabbed them in the back with the 1793 Second Partition of Poland, from which Austria was entirely excluded. This led to the dismissal of Francis's chief minister, Philipp von Cobenzl, and his replacement with Franz Maria Thugut in March 1793.

Once again, there were initial successes against the disorganized armies of the French Republic in 1793, and the Netherlands were recovered. But in 1794 the tide turned once more, and Austrian forces were driven out of the Netherlands again—this time for good. Meanwhile, the Polish Crisis again became critical, resulting in a Third Partition (1795), in which Austria managed to secure important gains. The war in the west continued to go badly, as most of the coalition made peace, leaving Austria with only Britain and Piedmont-Sardinia as allies. In 1796, the French Directory planned a two-pronged campaign in Germany to force the Austrians to make peace, with a secondary thrust planned into Italy. French forces entered Bavaria and the edge of the Tyrol, before encountering Austrian forces under Archduke Charles, the Emperor's brother, at Amberg (24 August 1796) who was successful in driving the French back in Germany. Meanwhile, the French Army of Italy, under the command of the young Corsican General Napoleon Bonaparte, was brilliantly successful, forcing Piedmont out of the war, driving the Austrians out of Lombardy and besieging Mantua. Following the capture of Mantua in early 1797, Bonaparte advanced north through the Alps against Vienna, while new French armies moved again into Germany. Austria sued for peace. By the terms of the Treaty of Campo Formio of 1797, Austria renounced its claims to the Netherlands and Lombardy, in exchange for which it was granted the territories of the Republic of Venice with the French. The Austrians also provisionally recognized the French annexation of the Left Bank of the Rhine, and agreed in principle that the German princes of the region should be compensated with ecclesiastical lands on the other side of the Rhine.

==== War of the Second Coalition (1798–1801) ====
The peace did not last for long. Soon, differences emerged between the Austrians and French over the reorganization of Germany, and Austria joined Russia, Britain, and Naples in the War of the Second Coalition in 1799. Although Austro-Russian forces were initially successful in driving the French from Italy, the tide soon turned—the Russians withdrew from the war after a defeat at Zürich (1799) which they blamed on Austrian recklessness, and the Austrians were defeated by Bonaparte who was now the First Consul, at Marengo, which forced them to withdraw from Italy, and then in Germany at Hohenlinden. These defeats forced Thugut's resignation, and Austria, now led by Ludwig Cobenzl, to make peace at Lunéville in early 1801. The terms were mild—the terms of Campo Formio were largely reinstated, but now the way was clear for a reorganization of the Empire on French lines. By the Imperial Deputation Report of 1803, the Holy Roman Empire was entirely reorganized, with nearly all of the ecclesiastical territories and free cities, traditionally the parts of the Empire most friendly to the House of Austria, eliminated.

=== Napoleonic wars and end of Empire (1803–1815) ===
With Bonaparte's assumption of the title of Emperor of the First French Empire on 18 May 1804, Francis II, seeing the writing on the wall for the old Empire, and arbitrarily took the new title of "Emperor of Austria" as Francis I, in addition to his title of Holy Roman Emperor. This earned him the title of Double Emperor (Francis II of the Holy Roman Empire, Francis I of Austria). The arrival of a new, French, emperor on the scene and the restructuring of the old presented a larger threat to the Habsburgs than their territorial losses to date, for there was no longer any certainty that they would continue to be elected. Francis had himself made emperor of the new Austrian Empire on 11 August not long after Napoleon. The new empire referred to not a new state but to the lands ruled by Austria, that is the Habsburgs, which was effectively many states.

==== War of the Third Coalition (1805) ====
Soon, Napoleon's continuing machinations in Italy, including the annexation of Genoa and Parma, led once again to war in 1805—the War of the Third Coalition, in which Austria, Britain, Russia, and Sweden took on Napoleon. The Austrian forces began the war by invading Bavaria, a key French ally in Germany, but were soon outmaneuvered and forced to surrender by Napoleon at Ulm, before the main Austro-Russian force was defeated at Austerlitz on 2 December. Napoleon entered Vienna itself, as much a celebrity as conqueror. By the Treaty of Pressburg, Austria was forced to give up large amounts of territory—Dalmatia to France, Venetia to Napoleon's Kingdom of Italy, the Tyrol to Bavaria, and Austria's various Swabian territories to Baden and Württemberg, although Salzburg, formerly held by Francis's younger brother, the previous Grand Duke of Tuscany, was annexed by Austria as compensation.

The defeat meant the end of the old Holy Roman Empire. Napoleon's satellite states in southern and Western Germany seceded from the Empire in the summer of 1806, forming the Confederation of the Rhine, and a few days later Francis proclaimed the Empire dissolved, and renounced the old imperial crown on 6 August 1806.

==== War of the Fifth Coalition (1809) ====
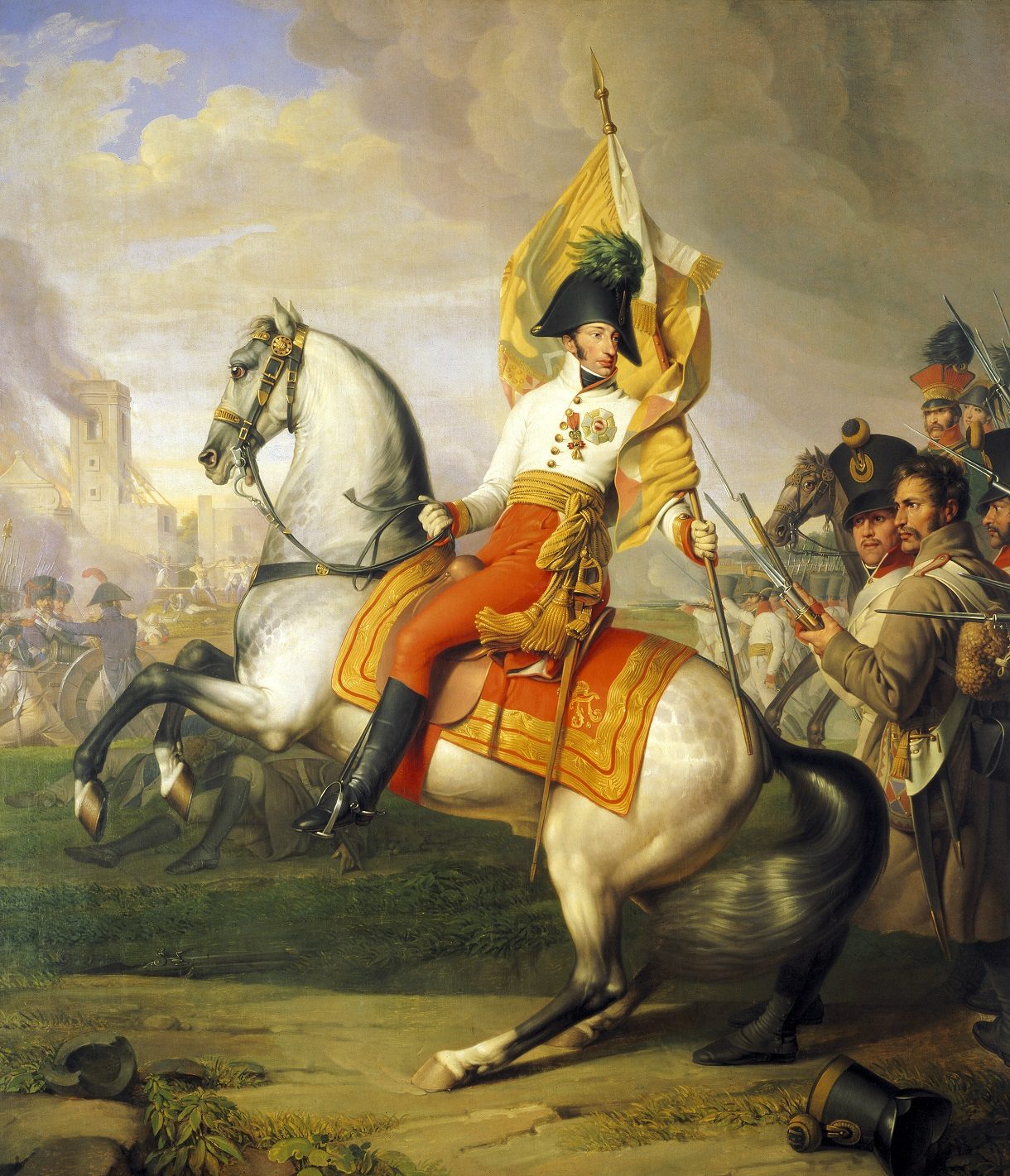
Victorious Archduke Charles of Austria during the Battle of Aspern-Essling (21–22 May 1809)

Over the next three years Austria, whose foreign policy was now directed by Philipp Stadion, attempted to maintain peace with France, avoiding the War of the Fourth Coalition (1806–1807) but obliged to do France's bidding. The overthrow of the Spanish Bourbons in 1808 was deeply disturbing to the Habsburgs, who rather desperately went to war once again in 1809, the War of the Fifth Coalition this time with no continental allies, but the United Kingdom. Stadion's attempts to generate popular uprisings in Germany were unsuccessful, and the Russians honoured their alliance with France, so Austria was once again defeated at the Battle of Wagram, although at greater cost than Napoleon, who had suffered his first battlefield defeat in this war, at Aspern-Essling, had expected. However Napoleon had already re-occupied Vienna. The terms of the subsequent Treaty of Schönbrunn were quite harsh. Austria lost Salzburg to Bavaria, some of its Polish lands to Russia, and its remaining territory on the Adriatic (including much of Carinthia and Styria) to Napoleon's Illyrian Provinces. Austria became a virtual subject state of France.

==== War of the Sixth Coalition (1812–1814) ====
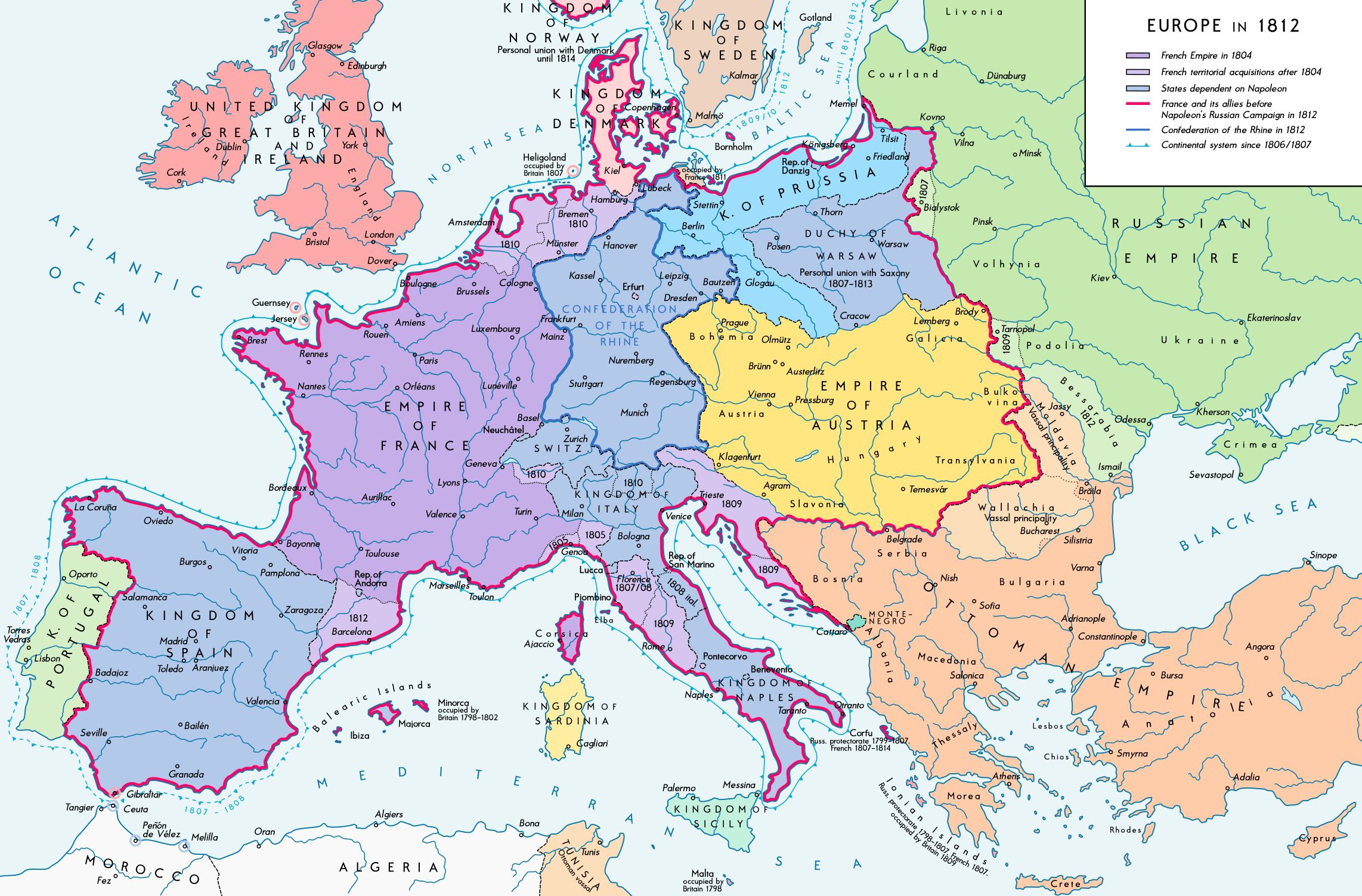
Europe in 1812 after several French victories

Klemens von Metternich, the new Austrian foreign minister, aimed to pursue a pro-French policy. Francis II's daughter Marie Louise, was married to Napoleon in 1810. Austria was effectively bankrupt by 1811 and the paper money lost considerable value, but contributed an army to Napoleon's invasion of Russia in March 1812. With Napoleon's disastrous defeat in Russia at the end of the year, and Prussia's defection to the Russian side in March 1813, Metternich began slowly to shift his policy. Initially he aimed to mediate a peace between France and its continental enemies, but when it became apparent that Napoleon was not interested in compromise, Austria joined the allies and declared war on France in August 1813 in the War of the Sixth Coalition (1812–1814). The Austrian intervention was decisive. Napoleon was defeated at Leipzig in October, and forced to withdraw into France itself. As 1814 began, the Allied forces invaded France. Initially, Metternich remained unsure as to whether he wanted Napoleon to remain on the throne, a Marie Louise regency for Napoleon's young son, or a Bourbon restoration, but he was eventually brought around by British Foreign Secretary Lord Castlereagh to the last position. Napoleon abdicated on 3 April 1814, and Louis XVIII was restored, soon negotiating a peace treaty with the victorious allies at Paris in June, while Napoleon was exiled to Elba.

==== War of the Seventh Coalition (1815) ====
Napoleon escaped in February 1815, Louis fled and thus the final phase of the war, the War of the Seventh Coalition, ensued—the so-called Hundred Days of Napoleon's attempt at restoration. This culminated with the decisive Battle of Waterloo in June. The Napoleonic wars ended with the second Treaty of Paris that year, and Napoleon's final exile to St Helena.

=== Congress of Vienna (1815) ===
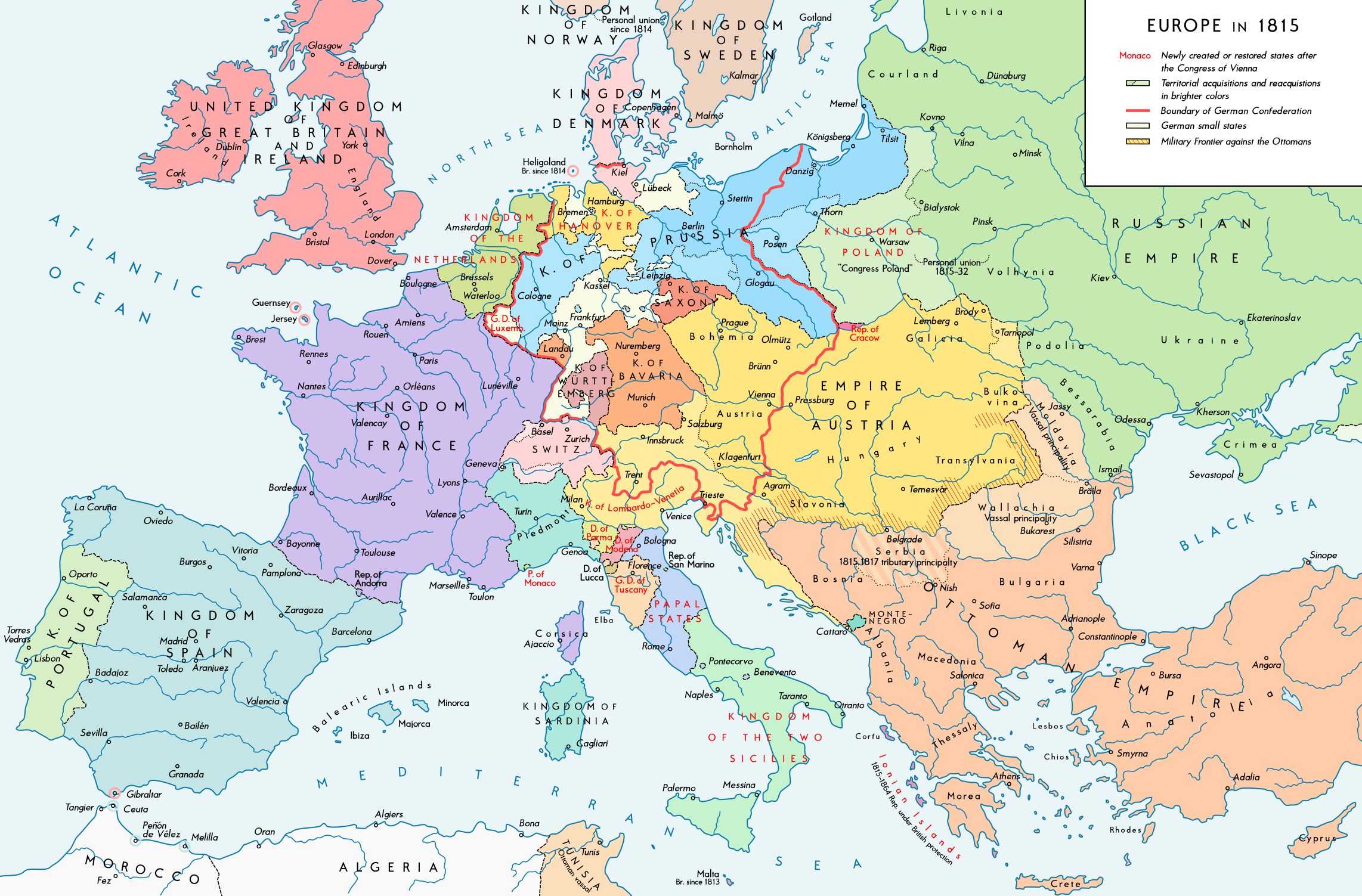
Europe after the Congress of Vienna

With the completion of the long running French wars a new order was required in Europe and the heads of the European states gathered in Vienna for a prolonged discussion of Europe's future, although the Congress was actually convened in September 1814 prior to Napoleon's attempted return, and completed on 9 June 1815, nine days before the Battle of Waterloo. At the completion of the Napoleonic wars, Austria found itself on the winning side as a new European leader, largely due to Metternich's diplomatic skills. It was as much a grand social event of the representatives of the great powers as a true Congress and was chaired by Metternich. Its purpose was to restore a new European order to emerge from the chaos of the Napoleonic wars. While Austria was the diplomatic leader, the military victory was largely that of Russia and Prussia, aided by Britain and Spain, and Austria had little to add to the final defeat of Napoleon on 18 June 1815 at Waterloo. Metternich's intent was to create a balance of power in Europe, under a new entity, the German Confederation with Austrian leadership, out of the ashes of the Holy Roman Empire.

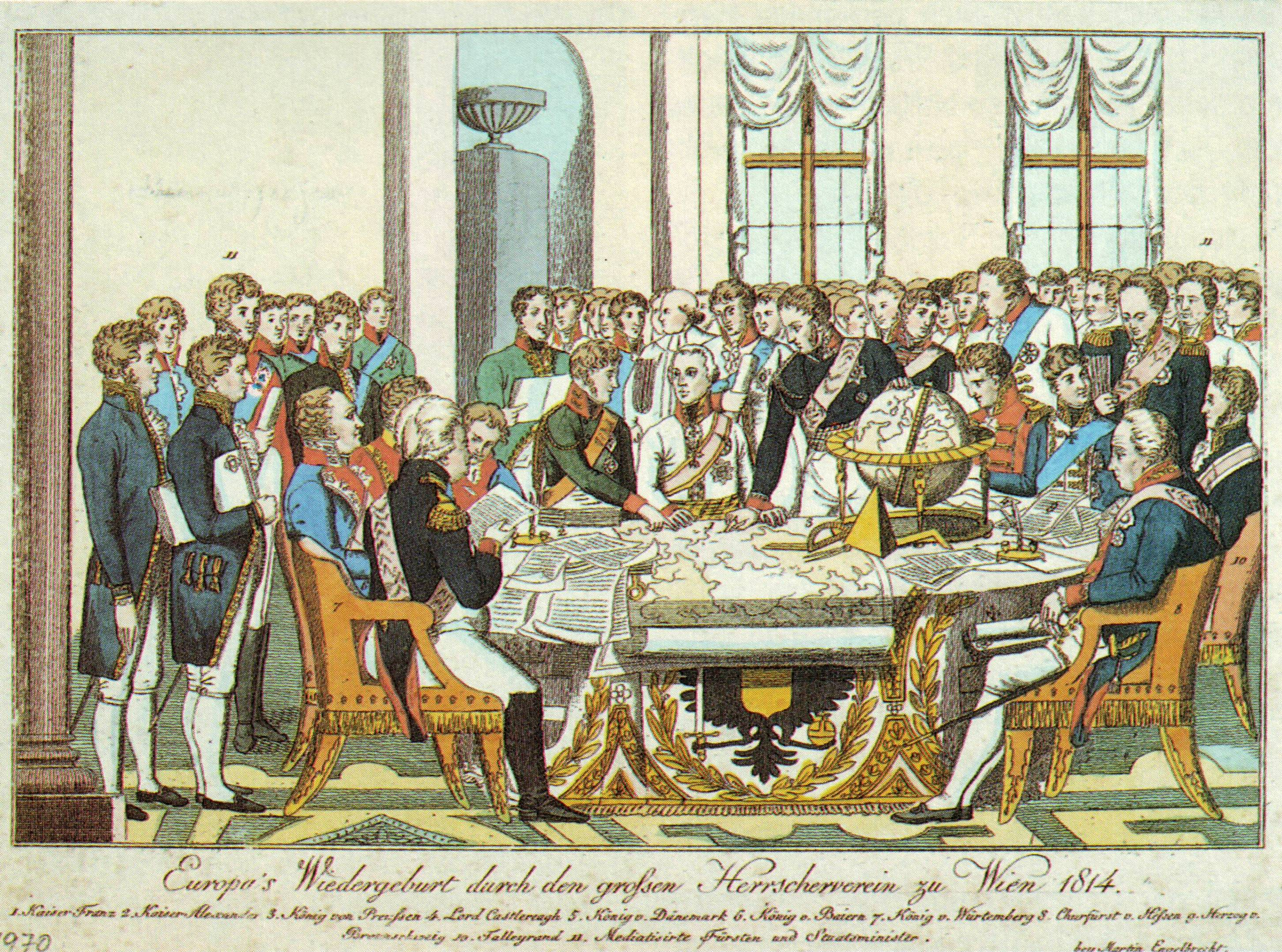
Negotiations at the Congress of Vienna

The resulting order was referred to as the Concert of Europe, which would now meet regularly to resolve outstanding differences. In addition to redrawing the political map, it established spheres of influence. Achieving the presidency of this new entity was Austria's greatest gain from the Congress. What the Congress could not do was to recover the old order or ancien régime on which Austrian and Habsburg authority had rested. In the new order, a Holy Alliance was created between Austria, Russia and Prussia. This was subsequently enlarged to include most European nations. Notable exceptions were Great Britain, wary of Metternich's strategy of repressive interventionism, and the Ottoman Empire. In the redrawing of the European map, Austrian gains were modest compared to Russia and Prussia, reflecting its relatively weak negotiating position. Austria regained most of the territory it had lost to Napoleon in the western part of the nation (Tyrol, Salzburg and Vorarlberg). In Italy it gained the Kingdom of Lombardy-Venetia, Tuscany, Modena, Parma and Piacenza. These latter political entities were ruled by various branches of the Habsburgs. It did not, however, regain Belgium and the Austrian Netherlands, but the trading of territories restored a contiguous territory, as envisaged by Joseph II, and gave Austria control over Italy. The Emperor Francis was unwilling to adapt to this new order, requiring diplomacy on Metternich's part, depicting it as conservative Romanticism, religion and order versus the revolutionary spirit of 1789. Thus, the Holy Alliance became a mechanism for countering any moves against legitimate order. Metternich has therefore been portrayed Europe's fireman, extinguishing any signs of revolutionary spirit. The resultant onset of peace provided the opportunity for both reforms and prosperity in Austria, but its backward looking policies within a Europe characterised by rapid change set the scene for eventual failure.

=== The arts ===
Napoleonic Vienna was the Vienna of Beethoven, whose single opera Fidelio was premiered there in 1805, attended by the French military. It was also the era of the third (Eroica) (1805) with its ambivalent relation to Napoleon, and the fifth (Schicksals-) and the sixth (Pastorale) symphonies (1808).

== Post Napoleonic wars (1815–1867) ==
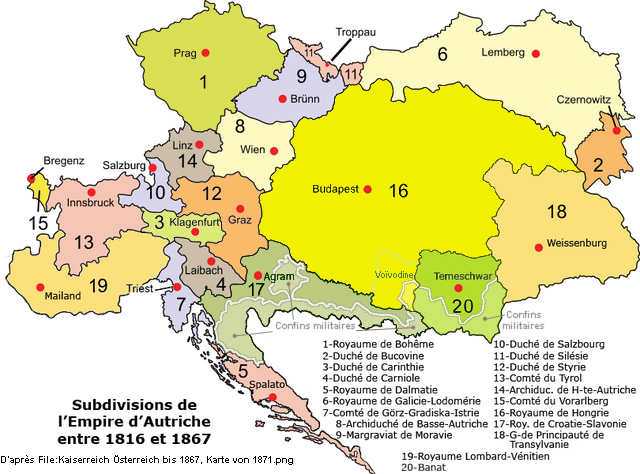
Austrian Empire after Congress of Vienna, 1816

=== Biedermaier period (1815–1848) ===
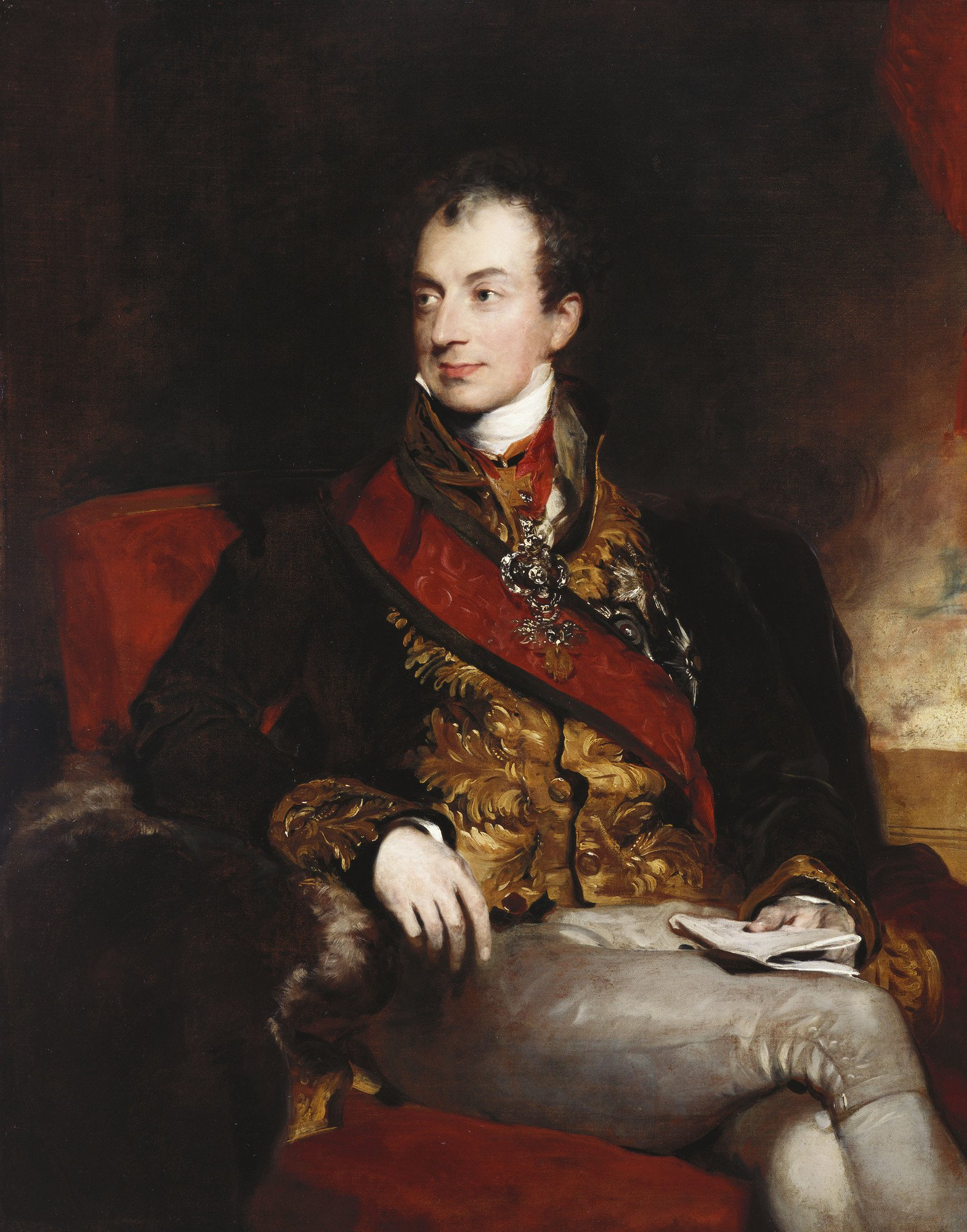
Prince Metternich, by Thomas Lawrence c. 1820

The period following the Congress of Vienna was one of relative political stability and is better known for its culture (Biedermeier). Other names for the years 1815–1848 include Vormärz ("before March") referring to period before the revolution of March 1848 and "The Age of Metternich" referring to his dominant position in European politics. Under the control of Metternich (who became Chancellor in 1821), the Austrian Empire entered a period of censorship and a police state, with surveillance spying and imprisonment of the opposition, while others emigrated. For Europe it was a period characterised by increasing industrialisation, the social consequences of economic cycles, population mobility and nationalism. All of these were regarded warily by governments intent on preserving the existing order.

In 1823, the Emperor of Austria made the five Rothschild brothers barons. Nathan Mayer Rothschild in London chose not to take up the title. The family became famous as bankers in the major countries of Europe.

==== Foreign policy ====
The Congress of Vienna was followed by a series of other congresses, referred to as the Congress System, including the Congresses of Aix-la-Chapelle (1818), Troppau (1820), Laibach (1821) and Verona (1822). These largely served to further suppress change, though a notable exception was the reintegration of France at the first of these, resulting in the Quintuple Alliance of the five great powers (Britain, Austria, Prussia, Russia and then France). Within the Quintuple Alliance, the more conservative Holy Alliance of Russia, Austria and Prussia tended to dominate the discourse. The Congress System of dispute resolution did not survive the 1820s, and in particular the intervention in the War of Greek Independence (1821-1832) over Metternich's objections, revealed the limits of his power. Further cracks in the old order appeared as South America broke away from Spain and Portugal, a liberal regime appeared in Portugal, and French Revolution and the independence of Belgium in 1830. Throughout there had been a division within the Quintuple Alliance between the more liberal western nations of Britain and France and the more conservative Holy Alliance in the east. The London conference of 1830 to decide on Belgian independence from the Netherlands effectively led to Britain's withdrawal from the Alliance. 1840 saw a number of related events that reflected on the unity of the Great Powers. Austria relied on Russia over the Eastern Question, and the Oriental crisis of that year split those powers, at least temporarily. While in the west, the Rhine crisis between France and the German Confederation, further fuelled the nascent German nationalism movement, typified by Die Wacht am Rhein

Closer to home, Metternich exerted his influence in suppressing German nationalism. The Wartburg Festival of 1817 with its calls for German unity and condemnation of conservatism created alarm. Metternich prevented Austrian universities participating and further activism in 1819 with the assassination of August von Kotzebue in 1819 resulted in the Carlsbad Decrees of that year, suppressing free speech, and the Vienna Final Act (Note: Final Act of the Ministerial Conference to Complete and Consolidate the Organization of the German Confederation) of 1820 empowering the German Confederation to act against member states. Neither fully succeeded in delaying the nationalist movement for long.

==== Domestic policy and the rise of nationalism ====
Early efforts among the Italians to create a unified nation, including the Carbonari in Lombardy-Venetia were put down by Metternich with military intervention, similarly in Poland. Meanwhile, the minority populations within the empire, such as the Slavs and Poles were seeking national identities, distinct from Austria. Metternich sought to deflect these movements into cultural identity. Similarly in Germany, a Prussian led German Customs Union of the German states was formed in 1833, but Austria did not join, identifying within it German nationalism. One of the few administrative reforms was the granting of a diet to Galicia.

Metternich kept a firm hand on government resisting the constitutional freedoms demanded by the liberals. Government was by custom and by imperial decree. He was both an oppressive reactionary opportunist but also a true conservative politician. His role in directing European affairs gave the Habsburgs a disproportionate influence relative to their actual powers. The extensive security mechanism was headed by Count Joseph Sedlnitzky, under Metternich's personal supervision, while religion was seen merely as a tool for supporting authority.

==== Economy ====
State intervention in fiscal matters was relatively restrained, although the National Bank of Austria was established in 1816 to restore the nation's credit status. Taxation was largely left to the provinces and uneven within the empire, Hungary paying disproportionally less. The aristocrats were also undertaxed. One of the results was that the military budget was relatively small, and thus unable to give much force to Metternich's foreign policies. Economic growth was relatively small and did not keep pace with population growth. Industrialisation in Austria began around 1830, primarily in Vienna and Vorarlberg. 1838 saw the first railway, connecting Vienna and Deutsch-Wagram, a distance of about 15 km, and construction on the Austrian Southern Railway (Österreichische Südbahn) started the following year. In shipping, the Danube Steam Navigation Company was established in 1829, while Austrian Lloyd became the largest shipping company in the Mediterranean. These economic developments came at a cost as large numbers of farm workers migrated to the growing urban industries to form an expanding proletariat.

==== Monarchy ====
Francis firmly resisted Metternich's proposals for overhauling the Monarchy. When Francis died in 1835, his son Ferdinand I ("the Benign"; 1835–1848) succeeded him, but proved unfit to govern due to illness, with much of the decision making falling to his uncle Archduke Louis of Austria and Metternich. Consequently, Austria entered a period of political stagnation with Francis being unwilling to make reforms and Ferdinand being incapable of so doing, and Metternich committed to preserving the status quo.

=== 1848 Revolution ===
During this period both liberalism and nationalism were on the rise, which resulted in the Revolutions of 1848. Metternich and the mentally handicapped Emperor Ferdinand I were forced to resign to be replaced by the emperor's young nephew Franz Joseph.

=== Franz Joseph I and the Belle Époque (1848–1914) ===
==== Post-revolutionary Austria (1848–1866) ====
Separatist tendencies (especially in Lombardy and Hungary) were suppressed by military force. A constitution was enacted in March 1848, but it had little practical impact, although elections were held in June. The 1850s saw a return to neoabsolutism and abrogation of constitutionalism. That said, one of the concessions to revolutionaries with a lasting impact was the freeing of peasants in Austria. This facilitated industrialization, as many flocked to the newly industrializing cities of the Austrian domain (in the industrial centers of Bohemia, Lower Austria, Vienna, and Upper Styria). Social upheaval led to increased strife in ethnically mixed cities, leading to mass nationalist movements.

On the foreign policy front, Austria with its non-German constituencies, was faced with a dilemma in 1848 when Germany's Constituent National Assembly, of which Austria was a member, stated that members could not have a state connection with non-German states, leaving Austria to decide between Germany or its Empire and Hungarian union. These plans came to nothing for the time being, but the concept of a smaller Germany that excluded Austria was to re-emerge as the solution in 1866. Austria's neutrality during the Crimean War (1853–1856), while the emperor was preoccupied with his wedding, antagonized both sides and left Austria dangerously isolated, as subsequent events proved.

==== The Italian question (1859–1860) ====
Italy in 1859. The Kingdom of Lombardy–Venetia is colored cyan at the top-right.

While Austria and the Habsburgs held hegemony over northern Italy, the south was the Kingdom of the Two Sicilies, with the Papal States intervening. Italy had been in a turmoil since the Congress of Vienna in 1815, with insurrections starting in 1820. King Ferdinand II of the Two Sicilies, an absolutist monarch, sought to strengthen his position by a further dynastic alliance with Austria. He already had a connection through his second wife, Maria Theresa, granddaughter of the emperor Leopold II. This he achieved by marrying his son, Francis II, to Duchess Maria Sophie of Bavaria in February 1859. Marie was a younger sister of the Empress Elisabeth of Austria, making Francis brother in law to the Emperor. Ferdinand died a few months later in May, and Francis and Maria Sophie ascended the throne.

In the meantime Austria had fallen into a trap set by the Italian risorgimento. Piedmont, jointly ruled with Sardinia had been the site of earlier insurrections. This time they formed a secret alliance with France (Patto di Plombières) whose emperor Napoleon III was a previous Carbonari. Piedmont then proceeded to provoke Vienna with a series of military manoeuvres, successfully triggering an ultimatum to Turin on 23 April. Its rejection was followed by an Austrian invasion, and precipitated war with France (Second Italian War of Independence 1859). Austria mistakenly expected support and received none, and the country was ill-prepared for war, which went badly. The Habsburg rulers in Tuscany and Modena were forced to flee to Vienna.

In May 1859 Austria suffered a military defeat at the Battle of Varese and in June at Magenta against the combined forces of France and Sardinia. The emperor refused to acknowledge the seriousness of the situation which was causing great hardship at home, and took over direct command of the army, though not a professional soldier. Later that month a further defeat at Solférino sealed Austria's fate, and the emperor found himself having to accept Napoleon's terms at Villafranca. Austria agreed to cede Lombardy, and the rulers of the central Italian states were to be restored. The latter never happened, and the following year in plebiscites, all joined the Kingdom of Sardinia-Piedmont. By April 1860 Garibaldi had invaded and quickly subdued Sicily, and by February 1861 the Kingdom of the Two Sicilies ceased to exist; Francis and Maria fled to Austria.

==== Aftermath—constitutional concessions ====
These events severely weakened the emperor's position. The government's absolutist policies were unpopular and these setbacks led to domestic unrest, Hungarian secessionism, criticism of Austria's governance and allegations of corruption. The first casualties were the emperor's ministers. The Finance Minister, Karl Ludwig von Bruck killed himself. Other casualties were Count Karl Ferdinand von Buol (Foreign Minister), Interior Minister Baron Alexander von Bach, Police Minister Johann Freiherr von Kempen von Fichtenstamm, Adjutant General Karl Ludwig von Grünne, together with army generals.

The result was a reluctant undertaking by the emperor and his chief advisor Goluchowski to return to constitutional government, culminating in the October Diploma (October 1860) establishing constitutional monarchy through a legislative assembly and provincial autonomy. This was never completely implemented due to Hungarian resistance, demanding the full autonomy lost in 1849. Consequently, the October Diploma was replaced by the February Patent, in 1861 establishing a bicameral legislative body, the Reichsrat. The upper house consisted of appointed and hereditary positions, while the lower house, the House of Deputies was appointed by the provincial diets. The Reichsrat would meet with or without the Hungarians, depending on the issues being considered. This was a first step towards the establishment of a separate Cisleithanian legislature, on the other hand the more limited role of the diets in the February Patent, compared to the October Diploma, angered the champions of regionalism. The Reichsrat was dominated by liberals, who were to be the dominant political force for the next two decades.

==== The Danish question (1864–1866) ====
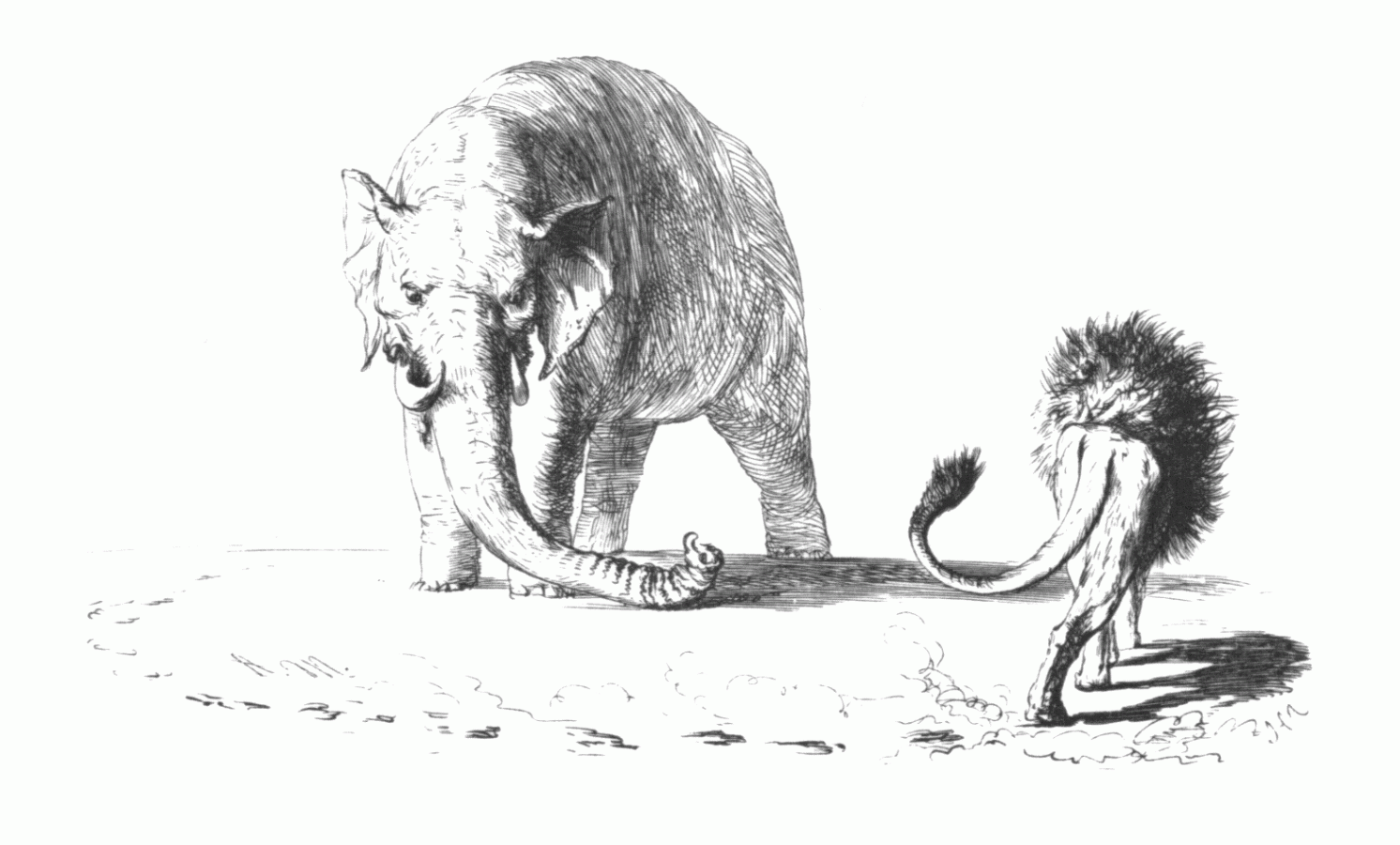
The Prussian lion circling the Austrian elephant. Adolph Menzel, 1846

Prussia and Denmark had already fought one war in 1848–1851 over the territories that lined their common border, Schleswig-Holstein which resulted in Denmark retaining them. By 1864 Austria was at war again, this time allying itself with Prussia against Denmark in the Second Schleswig War, which although successful this time, turned out to be Austria's last military victory. The war concluded with the Treaty of Vienna by which Denmark ceded the territories. The following year the Gastein Convention resolved the control of the new territories, Holstein being allocated to Austria, after initial conflicts between the allies. This did little to ease the Austria–Prussia rivalry over the German question. The ongoing efforts by Otto von Bismarck, the Prussian Minister President, to revoke the agreement and wrest control of the territories would soon lead to all out conflict between the two powers and achieve the desired weakening of Austria's position in central Europe.

==== The Hungarian question ====
From the 1848 revolution, in which much of the Hungarian aristocracy had participated, Hungary remained restless, restoration of the constitution and de-throne the House of Habsburg, opposing the centralist trials of Vienna and refusing to pay taxes. Hungary had little support in the court at Vienna which was strongly Bohemian and considered the Hungarians as revolutionaries. From the loss of the Italian territories in 1859, the Hungarian question became more prominent. Hungary was negotiating with foreign powers to support it, and most significantly with Prussia. Therefore, Hungary represented a threat to Austria in any opposition to Prussia within the German Confederation over the German Question. Therefore, cautious discussions over concessions, referred to as Conciliation by the Hungarians, started to take place. Emperor Franz Joseph traveled to Budapest in June 1865 and made a few concessions, such as abolishing the military jurisdiction, and granting an amnesty to the press. This fell far short of the requests of the Hungarian liberals whose minimal demands were restoration of the constitution and the emperor's separate coronation as King of Hungary. Chief among these were Gyula Andrássy and Ferenc Deák, who endeavoured to improve their influence at the court in Vienna. In January 1866 a delegation of the Hungarian parliament traveled to Vienna to invite the imperial family to make an official visit to Hungary, which they did, at some length from January to March.

==== Austro-Prussian War (1866) ====
While Andrássy was making frequent visits to Vienna from Budapest during early 1866, relations with Prussia were deteriorating. There was talk of war. Prussia had signed a secret treaty with the relatively new Kingdom of Italy on 8 April, while Austria concluded one with France on 12 June, in exchange for Venetia.

While the motives for the war, Prussian masterplan or opportunism, are disputed, the outcome was a radical re-alignment of power in Central Europe. Austria brought the continuing dispute over Holstein before the German diet and also decided to convene the Holstein diet. Prussia, declaring that the Gastein Convention had thereby been nullified, invaded Holstein. When the German diet responded by voting for a partial mobilization against Prussia, Bismarck declared that the German Confederation was ended. Thus this may be considered a Third Schleswig War.

Hostilities broke out on 14 June as the Austro-Prussian War (June–August 1866), in which Prussia and the north German states faced not only Austria but much of the rest of Germany, especially the southern states. Three days later Italy declared war on Austria in the Third Italian War of Independence, Italy now being Prussia's ally. Thus Austria had to fight on two fronts. Their first engagement resulted in a minor victory against the Italians at Custoza near Verona on 24 June. Yet, on the northern front Austria suffered a major military defeat at the Battle of Königgrätz in Bohemia on 3 July. Although Austria had a further victory against the Italians in a naval battle at Lissa on 20 July, it was clear by then that the war was over for Austria, Prussian armies threatening Vienna itself, forcing the evacuation of the court to Budapest. Napoleon III intervened resulting in an armistice at Nikolsburg on 21 July, and a peace treaty in Prague on 23 August. In the meantime the Italians who collected a series of successes throughout July, signed an armistice at Cormons on 12 August rather than face the remaining Austrian army freed from its northern front.

As a result of these wars Austria had now lost all its Italian territory and was now excluded from further German affairs, that were now reorganised under Prussian dominance in the new North German Confederation. The Kleindeutschland concept had prevailed. For the Austrians in Italy, the war had been tragically pointless, since Venetia had already been ceded.

== Dual Monarchy (1867–1918) ==
=== Conciliation ===
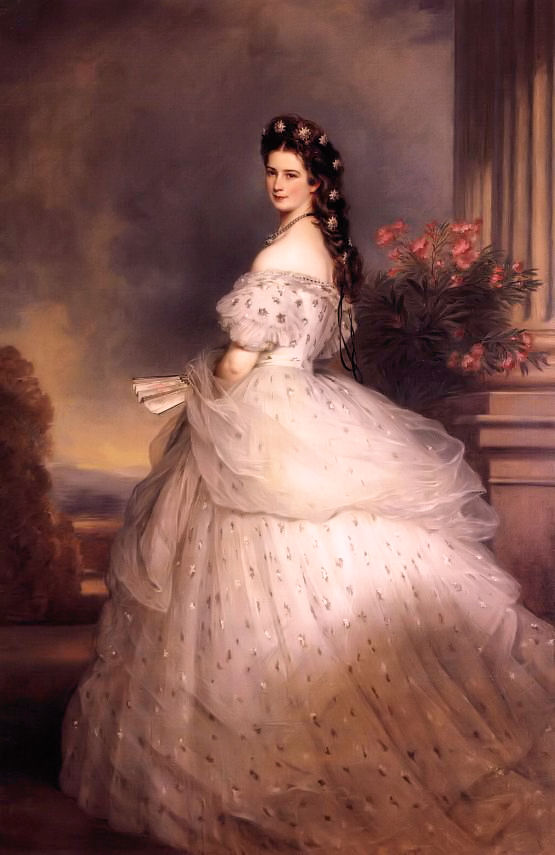
Empress Elisabeth, known as "Sisi"

While Austria was reeling from the effects of war, the Hungarians increased the pressure for their demands. Andrássy was regularly in Vienna, as was Ferenc Deák and the Hungarian position was backed by constitutionalists and liberals. While anti-Hungarian sentiments ran high at the court, the Emperor's position was becoming increasingly untenable, with the Prussian army now at Pressburg (now Bratislava), and Vienna crammed with exiles, while hope for French intervention proved to be fruitless. The Hungarians recruited Empress Elisabeth who became a strong advocate for their cause. György Klapka had organised a legion fighting for the Prussians, which Bismarck had supported, that entered Hungary and agitated for Hungarian independence.

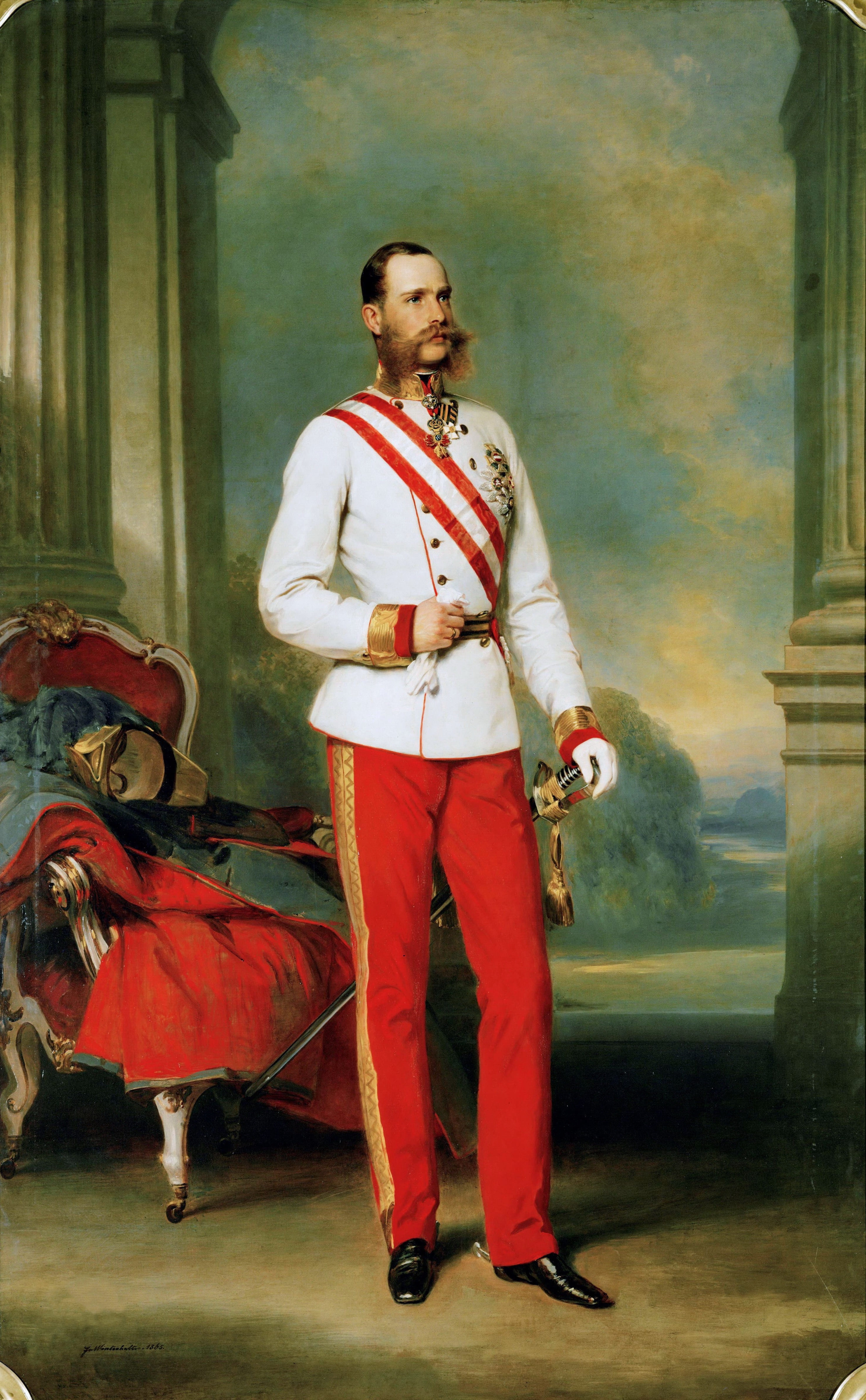
Portrait of Franz Joseph I by Franz Xaver Winterhalter, 1865.

However the needs of the other provinces had to be considered before entering into any form of Hungarian dualism which would give Hungary special privileges, and started to fan the flames of Czech nationalism, since Slavic interests were likely to be submerged. People started to talk about the events of 1848 again. By February 1867 Count Belcredi resigned as Minister President over his concerns about Slavic interests, and was succeeded by foreign minister Ferdinand Beust, who promptly pursued the Hungarian option which had become a reality by the end of the month.

=== Ausgleich (Compromise) 1867 ===
Austria-Hungary was created through the mechanism of the Austro-Hungarian Compromise of 1867. Thus the Hungarians finally achieved much of their aims. The western half of the realm known as (Cisleithania) and the eastern Hungarian (Transleithania), that is the realms lying on each side of the Leitha tributary of the Danube river, now became two realms with different interior policy - there was no common citizenship and dual-citizenship was banned either -, but with a common ruler and a common foreign and military policy. The empire now had two capitals, two cabinets and two parliaments. Only three cabinet positions served both halves of the monarchy, war, foreign affairs and finance (when both sectors were involved). Costs were assigned 70:30 to Cisleithania, however the Hungarians represented a single nationality while Cisleithania included all the other kingdoms and provinces. Andrássy was appointed as the first Minister President of the new Hungary on 17 February. Feelings ran high in the provinces, and the Diets in Moravia and Bohemia were shut down in March.

Emperor Franz Joseph made a speech from the throne in May to the Reichsrat (Imperial Council) asking for retroactive ratification and promising further constitutional reforms and increased autonomy to the provinces. This was a major retreat from absolutism. On 8 June, the Emperor and Empress were crowned King and Queen of Hungary in a ceremony whose pomp and splendour seemed out of keeping with Austria's recent military and political humiliation and the extent of financial reparations. As part of the celebrations the emperor announced further concessions that aggravated relationships between Hungary and the rest of the monarchy. An amnesty was declared for all political offences since 1848 (including Klapka and Kossuth) and reversal of the confiscation of estates. In addition the coronation Gift was directed to the families and veterans of the revolutionary Honvéds, which was revived as the Royal Hungarian Honvéd.

In return for the Liberals support of the Ausgleich, concessions were made to parliamentary prerogatives in the new constitutional law. The law of 21 December 1867, although frequently amended, was the foundation of Austrian governance for the remaining 50 years of the empire, and was largely based on the February Patent, the Imperial Council and included a bill of rights. Ultimately the political balance of the dual monarchy represented a compromise between authoritarianism and parliamentarianism (Rechtsstaat) (Hacohen 2002). Like most compromises it was rejected by extremists on both sides, including Kossuth.

=== Austria-Hungary, 1867–1914 ===
Small coat of arms of the Austro-Hungarian Empire 1867–1915, with the Habsburg Order of the Golden Fleece superimposed on the Austrian Doubleheaded Eagle, and crested by the Crown of Rudolf II

The year 1873 marked the Silver Jubilee of Franz Joseph, and provided not only an occasion for celebration but also one of reflection on the progress of the monarchy since 1848. Vienna had grown from a population of 500,000 to over a million, the walls and fortifications had been demolished and the Ringstrasse constructed with many magnificent new buildings along it. The Danube was being regulated to reduce the risk of flooding, a new aqueduct constructed to bring fresh water into the city, and many new bridges, schools, hospitals, churches and a new university built.

Foreign policy

What was supposed to be a temporary emergency measure was to last for half a century. Austria succeeded in staying neutral during the Franco Prussian War of 1870–71 despite those who saw an opportunity for revenge on Prussia for the events of 1866. However Austria's allies among the South German States were now allied with Prussia, and it was unlikely that Austria's military capacity had significantly improved in the meantime. Any residual doubts were rapidly dispelled by the speed of the Prussian advance and the subsequent overthrow of the Second Empire.

In November 1871 Austria made a radical change in foreign policy. Ferdinand Beust, the First Prime Minister (to 1867), Chancellor and Foreign Minister (1866–1871) of the Dual Monarchy, was dismissed. Beust was an advocate of revanche against Prussia, but was succeeded by the Hungarian Prime Minister, the liberal Gyula Andrássy as Foreign Minister (1871–1879), although both opposed the federalist policies of Prime Minister Karl Hohenwart (1871) while Prince Adolf of Auersperg became the new Prime Minister (1871–1879). Andrássy 's appointment caused concern among the conservative Court Party, but he worked hard to restore relationships between Berlin and Vienna, culminating in the Dual Alliance of 1879.

In 1878, Austria-Hungary occupied Bosnia and Herzegovina, which had been cut off from the rest of the Ottoman Empire by the creation of new states in the Balkans following the Russo-Turkish War of 1877–78 and the resulting Congress of Berlin (June–July 1878). The territory was ceded to Austria-Hungary, and Andrássy prepared to occupy it. This led to a further deterioration of relations with Russia and was to lead to tragic consequences in the next century. Austrian troops encountered stiff resistance and suffered significant casualties. The occupation created controversy both within and without the empire and led to Andrássy's resignation in 1879. This territory was finally annexed in 1908 and put under joint rule by the governments of both Austria and Hungary.

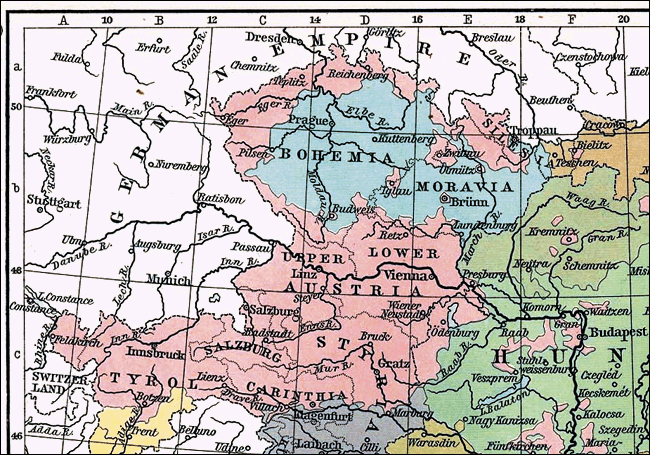
Map showing Austrian German–inhabited areas (in rose) in western Austro-Hungarian Empire in 1911

The departure of the Liberal Government and of Andrássy from the Foreign Office (k. u. k. Ministerium des Äußern) marked a sharp shift in Austria-Hungary's foreign policy, particularly in relation to Russia, Count Gustav Kálnoky (1881–1895) Andrássy's Conservative replacement pursuing a new rapprochement.

Economy

The second half of the 19th century saw a lot of construction, expansion of cities and railway lines, and development of industry. During the earlier part of this period, known as Gründerzeit, Austria became an industrialized country, even though the Alpine regions remained characterized by agriculture. Austria was able to celebrate its newfound grandeur in the Vienna World Exhibition of 1873, attended by all the crowned heads of Europe, and beyond. This period of relative prosperity was followed by the 1873 Stock market crash.

=== Politics and governance ===
==== Liberalism in Cisleithania 1867–1879 ====
Political parties became legitimate entities in Austria from 1848, apart from a brief lapse in the 1850s. However the structure of the legislative body created by the 1861 February Patent provided little scope for party organisation. Initial political organisation resembled the cleavages in Austrian culture. Since the time of the Counter-Reformation the Catholic Church had assumed a major role in the political life of the empire, in conjunction with the aristocracy and conservative rural elements. Allied against these forces were a more secular urban middle class, reflecting the Enlightenment and the French Revolution with its anti-clericism (Kulturkampf). Other elements on the left were German nationalism, defending Greater German interests against the Slavs, and found support among urban intelligentsia. However party structure was far from cohesive and both groupings contained factions which either supported or opposed the government of the day. These parties reflected the traditional right/left split of political vision. The left, or Liberal factions were known as the Constitutional Party, but both left and right were fragmented into factions. Without direct elections there was no place for constituency organisation, and affinities were intellectual not organisational. Nor, without ministerial responsibility, was there a need for such organisation. The affinities were driven by respective visions of the representative institutions. The left derived its name from its support in principle of the 1861–1867 constitution and were the driving elements of the 1848 revolution, the right supported historic rights. The left drew its support from the propertied bourgeoisie (Besitzbürgertum), affluent professionals and the civil service. These were longstanding ideological differences. The 1867 elections saw the Liberals take control of the lower house under Karl Auersperg (1867–1868) and were instrumental in the adoption of the 1867 constitution and in abrogating the 1855 Concordat (1870).

Suffrage progressively improved during the period 1860–1882. The selection of deputies to the Reichsrat by provincial legislatures proved unworkable particularly once the Bohemian diet effectively boycotted the Reichsrat in an attempt to acquire equal status with the Hungarians in a tripartite monarchy. As a result, suffrage was changed to direct election to the Reichsrat in 1873.

Even then by 1873 only six percent of the adult male population were franchised (Hacohen 2002). The initial divisions into Catholic, liberal, national, radical and agrarian parties differed across ethnic grounds further fragmenting the political culture. However, there was now emerging the presence of extra-parliamentary parties whereas previously parties were purely intra-parliamentary. This provided an opportunity for the disenfranchised to find a voice. These changes were taking place against a rapidly changing backdrop of an Austrian economy that was modernising and industrialising and economic crises such as that of 1873 and its resultant depression (1873–1879), and the traditional parties were slow to respond to the demands of the populace. By the election of 1901, the last election under the defined classes of franchisement extraparliamentary parties won 76 of the 118 seats.

This era saw anti-liberal sentiments and declining fortunes of the Liberal party which had held power since 1867 apart from a brief spell of conservative government in 1870–71. In 1870 Liberal support for Prussia in the 1870 Franco-Prussian War displeased the Emperor and he turned to the Conservatives to form a government under Count Karl Sigmund von Hohenwart (1871). Hohenwart was the conservative leader in parliament, and the Emperor believed his more sympathetic views to Slavic aspirations and federalism would weaken the Austro-German Liberals. Hohenwart appointed Albert Schäffle as his commerce minister and drew up a policy known as the Fundamental Articles of 1871. The policy failed, the Emperor withdrew his support and the Liberals regained power.

The Liberal party became progressively unliberal and more nationalistic, and against whose social conservatism the progressive intellectuals would rebel (Hacohen 2002). During their 1870–71 opposition they blocked attempts to extend the dual monarchy to a tripartite monarchy including the Czechs, and promoted the concept of Deutschtum (the granting of all rights of citizenship to those who displayed the characteristics of the solid German Bürger). They also opposed the extension of suffrage because restricted suffrage favoured their electoral base (Hacohen 2002). In 1873 the party fragmented, with a radical faction of the Constitutional Party forming the Progressive Club, while a right-wing faction formed the conservative Constitutionalist Landlordism leaving a rump of 'Old Liberals'. The result was a proliferation of German Liberal and German National groups.

=== Political realignment 1879 ===
While Liberal achievements had included economic modernisation, expanding secular education and rebuilding the fabric and culture of Vienna, while collaborating with the Administration (Verwaltung), after 1873 a progressive series of schisms and mergers continued to weaken the party which effectively disappeared by 1911.

The Liberal cabinet of Adolf Auersperg (1871–1879) was dismissed in 1879 over its opposition to Foreign Minister Gyula Andrássy's (1871–1879) Balkan policy and the occupation of Bosnia-Herzegovina, which added more Slavs and further diluted German nationalism and identity. In the ensuing elections the Liberals lost control of parliament and went into opposition, the incoming government under Count Edward Taaffe (1879–1893) basically consisting of a group of factions (farmers, clergy and Czechs), the "Iron Ring", united in a determination to keep the Liberals out of power.

Andrássy, who had nothing in common with Taaffe, tended his resignation on the grounds of poor health and to his surprise it was accepted. His name was raised again when the new Foreign minister, Haymerle died in office in 1881, but Taaffe and his coalition had no time for a Liberal foreign minister (let alone a Hungarian and Freemason), and he was passed over in favour of Count Gustav Kálnoky (1881–1895).

However the Liberal opposition filibustered leading the government to seek electoral reform as a strategy to weaken their position, which was enacted in 1882. Despite this, the coalition, nominally conservative and committed to anti-socialism passed a series of social reforms over the decade 1880–1890, following the examples of Germany and Switzerland. These were reforms which the Liberals had been unable to get past a government strongly tied to the concept of individual's rights to self-determination free from government interference Such measures had the support of both the Liberals, now the United Left (Vereinigte Linke 1881) and the German National Party (Deutsche Nationalpartei 1891), an offshoot of the German National Movement. The electoral reforms of 1882 were the most influential in that it enfranchised proportionally more Germans.

Social reform now moved to become a platform of conservative Catholics like Prince Aloys de Paula Maria of Liechtenstein, Baron Karl von Vogelsang, and Count Egbert Belcredi The era of electoral reform saw the emergence of Georg von Schonerer's Pan-German League (1882), appealing to an anti-clerical middle class, and Catholic social reformers such as L. Psenner and A. Latschka created the Christian Social Association (Christlich-Sozialer Verein) (1887). Around the same time F. Piffl, F. Stauracz, Ae. Schoepfer, A. Opitz, Karl Lueger and Prince Aloys Liechtenstein formed the United Christians to advocate Christian social reform. These two organisations merged in 1891 under Karl Lueger to form the Christian Social Party (Christlichsoziale Partei, CS).

However the Taaffe government's policy of ethnic inclusiveness fuelled nationalism among the German-speaking population. The Liberals had maintained the strong centralism of the absolutist era (with the exception of Galicia in 1867) while the Conservatives attempted a more federalist state that ultimately led to the fall of the Taaffe government in 1893, including a second attempt at Bohemian Ausgleich (Tripartite monarchy) in 1890

On the left the spread of anarchical ideas and oppressive government saw the emergence of a Marxist Social Democratic Party (Sozialdemokratische Arbeiterpartei Österreichs, SDAPÖ) in 1889 which succeeded in winning seats in the 1897 elections which followed further extension of suffrage in 1896 to include peasants and the working classes, establishing universal male suffrage, though not equal.

==== Direct and equal suffrage for the Reichsrat (1907) ====
2007 Austrian coin depicting 100 Years of Universal Male Suffrage, showing Parliament in 1907

The universal male suffrage introduced in 1907 by Minister-President Freiherr von Beck changed the balance of power, formally tilted towards German Austrians, and revealed that they were now a minority in a predominantly Slavic empire. In the 1900 census, Germans were 36% of the Cisleithanian population but the largest single group, but never acted as a cohesive group (nor did any other national group), although they were the dominant group in the political life of the monarchy. Germans were followed by Czechs and Slovaks (23%), Poles (17), Ruthenians (13), Slovenes (5), Serbo-Croats (3), Italians (3) and Romanians 1%. However these national groups, especially the Germans were often scattered geographically. The Germans also dominated economically, and in level of education.

Ethnic groups of Austria-Hungary in 1910

The post reform 1907 parliament (Reichsrat) was elected along national lines, with only the Christian-Social and Social Democrat parties predominantly German. However Austria was governed by the Emperor who appointed the Imperial Council of Ministers, who in turn answered to him, parliament being left free to criticise government policy. Technically it had the power to legislate from 1907, but in practice the Imperial government generated its own legislation, and the Emperor could veto his own minister's bills. The major parties were divided geographically and socially, with the social democrats base being the towns, predominantly Vienna, and having a very different perspective to the devout but illiterate peasantry in the countryside. The latter were joined by the aristocracy and bourgeoisie in supporting the status quo of the monarchy.

The 1911 elections elected a parliament that would carry Austria through the war and the end of the empire in 1918. However, the effectiveness of parliamentarism was hampered by conflicts between parties representing different ethnic groups, and meetings of the parliament ceased altogether during World War I.

==== The arts ====
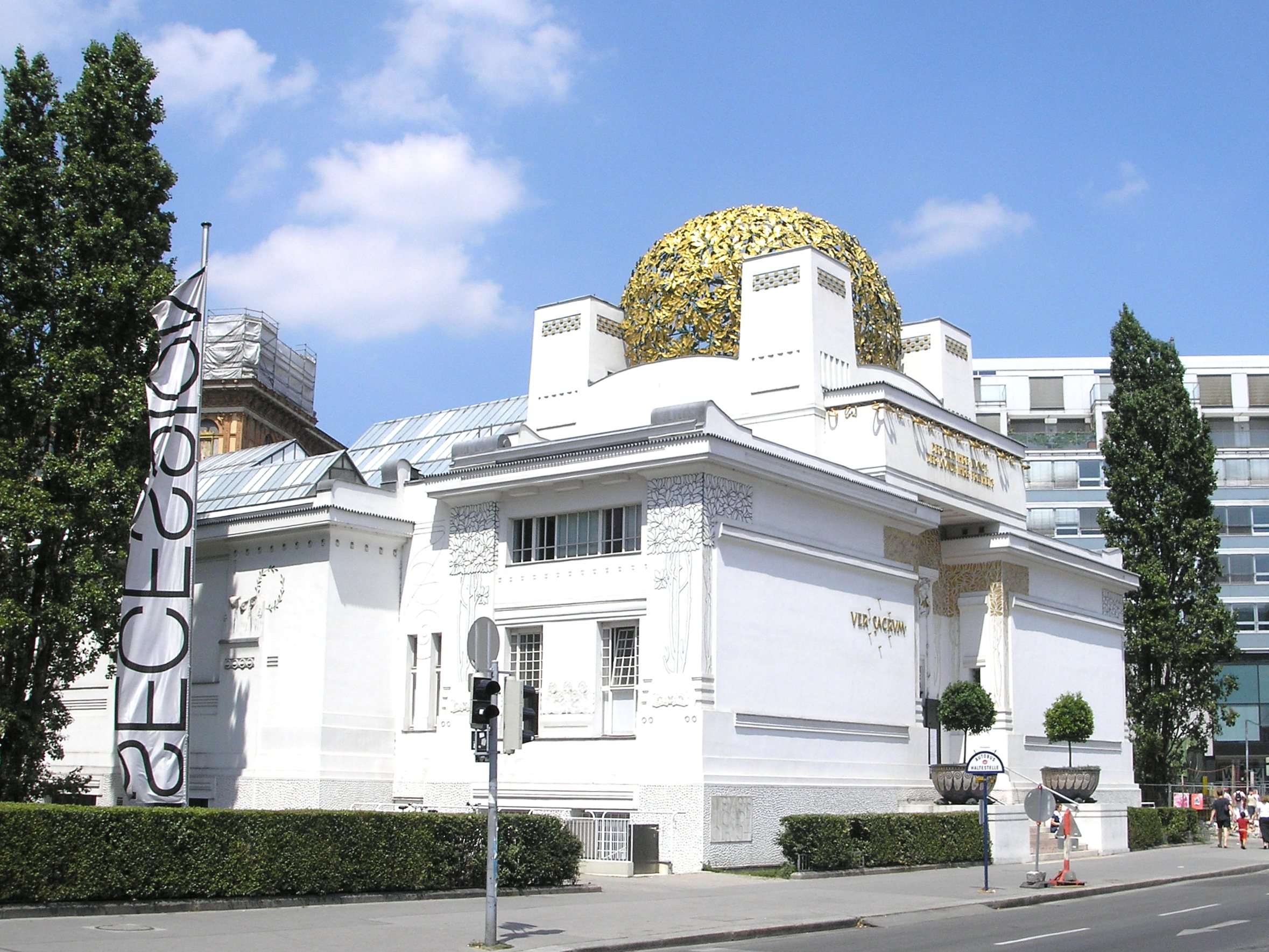
The Secession Building, Vienna, built in 1897 by Joseph Maria Olbrich for exhibitions of the Secession group

The initial years of the 19th century following the Congress of Vienna, up until the revolution of 1848 was characterised by the Biedermeier period of design and architecture, partly fueled by the repressive domestic scene that diverted attention to domesticity and the arts.

With the reign of Franz Joseph (1848–1916) came a new era of grandeur, typified by the Belle Époque style, with extensive building and the construction of the Ringstrasse in Vienna with its monumental buildings (officially opened 1 May 1865, after seven years). Architects of the period included Heinrich Ferstel (Votivkirche, Museum für angewandte Kunst Wien), Friedrich von Schmidt (Rathaus), Theophil Hansen (Parliament), Gottfried Semper (Kunsthistorisches Museum, Kunsthistorisches Museum, Burgtheater), Eduard van der Nüll (Opera) and August Sicardsburg (Opera).

1897 saw the resignation of a group of artists from the Association of Austrian Artists (Gesellschaft bildender Künstler Österreichs), headed by Gustav Klimt who became the first president of this group which became known as the Vienna Secession or Wiener Secession (Vereinigung Bildender Künstler Österreichs). The movement was a protest against the historicism and conservatism of the former organisation, following similar movements in Berlin and Munich. Partly this was a revolt against the perceived excesses of the earlier Ringstrasse era, and a yearning to return to the relative simplicity of Biedermaier. From this group Josef Hoffman and Koloman Moser formed the Vienna Arts and Crafts Workshop (Wiener Werkstätte) in 1903 to promote the development of applied arts. The Secession became associated with a specific building, the Secession Building (Wiener Secessionsgebäude) built in 1897 and which housed their exhibitions, starting in 1898. The Secession as originally conceived splintered in 1905 when Klimt and others left over irreconcilable differences. The group however lasted until 1939 and the outbreak of the Second World War.

Architecturally this was the era of Jugendstil (Art Nouveau) and the contrasting work of men like Otto Wagner (Kirche am Steinhof) known for embellishment and Adolf Loos, who represented restraint. Art Nouveau and the modern style came relatively late to Austria, around 1900, and was distinguishable from the earlier movement in other European capitals.

One of the prominent literary figures was Karl Kraus, the essayist and satirist, known for his newspaper "The Torch", founded in 1899.

On the musical scene, Johan Strauss and his family dominated the Viennese scene over the entire period, which also produced Franz Schubert, Ludwig van Beethoven, Anton Bruckner, Johannes Brahms, Arnold Schoenberg, Franz Lehár and Gustav Mahler among others.

By the opening years of the 20th century (Fin de siècle) the avant garde were beginning to challenge traditional values, often shocking Viennese society, such as Arthur Schnitzler's play Reigen, the paintings of Klimt, and the music of Schoenberg, Anton Webern and Alban Berg and the Second Viennese School.

== Austria in the First World War (1914–1918) ==
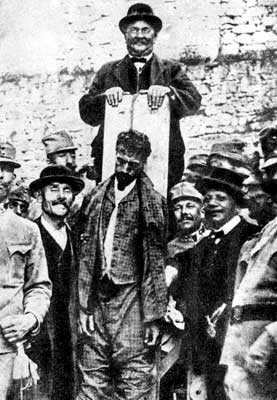
This image was used in the work The Last Days of Mankind by Karl Kraus, which has been described as the Austrian national drama, symbolic for the oppression in Austria, particular towards non-german people. Depicted is the irredentist Reichsrat and provincial assembly deputy Cesare Battisti after his execution by the for Austria typical garrote (1916) in the moat of the Castle of Trento, together with the infamous executioner Josef Lang.

Nationalist strife increased during the decades until 1914. The assassination in Sarajevo by a Serb nationalist group of Archduke Franz Ferdinand, the heir to Franz Joseph as Emperor, helped to trigger World War I. In November 1916 the Emperor died, leaving the relatively inexperienced Charles (Karl) in command. The defeat of the Central Powers in 1918 resulted in the disintegration of Austria-Hungary, and the Emperor went into exile.

== German Austria and the First Republic (1918–1933) ==
=== Republic of German-Austria (1918–1919) ===
==== 1918 ====
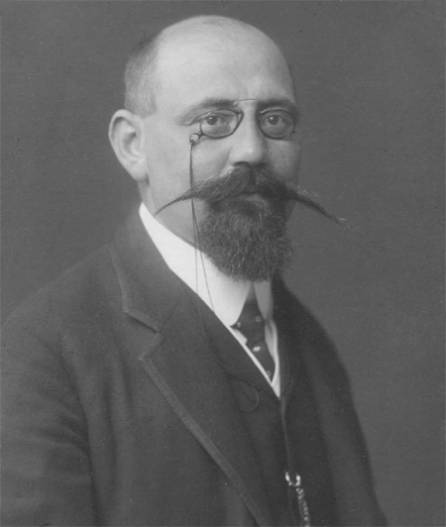
Karl Renner in 1905, Chancellor 12 November 1918 – 7 July 1920, President of the National Council 1931–1933

Territorial claims of Austria 1918/19

The First World War ended for Austria on 3 November 1918, when its defeated army signed the Armistice of Villa Giusti at Padua following the Battle of Vittorio Veneto. This applied just to Austria-Hungary, but Hungary had withdrawn from the conflict on 31 October 1918. Austria was forced to cede all territory occupied since 1914, plus accept the formation of new nations across most of its pre-war territory, and the allies were given access to Austria. The empire was thus dissolved.

The Provisional National Assembly met in Vienna from 21 October 1918 to 19 February 1919, as the first parliament of the new Austria, in the Lower Austria parliamentary buildings. It consisted of those members of the Imperial Council elected in 1911 from German speaking territories with three presidents, Franz Dinghofer, Jodok Fink, and Karl Seitz. The National Assembly continued its work till 16 February 1919 when elections were held. On 30 October it adopted a provisional constitution and on 12 November it adopted German Austria as the name of the new state. Since the Emperor, Charles I (Karl I) had stated on 11 November that he no longer had "any share in the affairs of state", although he always said that he never abdicated, Austria was now a republic.

However the provisional constitution stated that it was to be part of the new German (Weimar) Republic proclaimed three days earlier. Article 2 stated: "German Austria is part of the German Republic".

Karl Renner was proclaimed Chancellor of Austria, succeeding Heinrich Lammasch and led the first three cabinets (12 November 1918 – 7 July 1920) as a grand coalition of the largest parties, although some were composed of a large number of splinter groups of the German National and German Liberal movements, and were numerically the largest group in the assembly.

On 22 November Austria claimed the German-speaking territories of the former Habsburg Empire in Czechoslovakia (German Bohemia and parts of Moravia), Poland (Austrian Silesia) and the South Tyrol, annexed by Italy. However Austria was in no position to enforce these claims against either the victorious allies or the new nation states that emerged from the dissolution of the Empire and all the lands in question remained separated from the new Austria.

French premier Georges Clemenceau said: "Austria is what's left". An empire of over 50 million had been reduced to a state of 6.5 million.

==== 1919 ====
On 19 February elections were held for what was now called the Constituent National Assembly. Although the Social Democrats won the most seats (41%) they did not have an absolute majority and formed a grand coalition with the second-largest party, the Christian Socialists. On 12 March the National Assembly declared "German Austria" to be part of the "German Republic".

Large sections of the population and most representatives of political parties were of the opinion that this "residual" or "rump state" – without Hungary's agriculture sector and Bohemia's industry – would not be economically viable. The journalist Hellmut Andics (1922–1998) expressed this sentiment in his book entitled Der Staat, den keiner wollte (The state that nobody wanted) in 1962.

Austria's exact future remained uncertain until formal treaties were signed and ratified. This process began with the opening of the Peace Conference in Paris on 18 January 1919 and culminated in the signing of the Treaty of Saint Germain on 10 September that year, although the National Assembly initially rejected the draft treaty on 7 June.

=== The First Republic, 1919–1933 ===
==== Treaty of Saint Germain 1919 ====
The fledgling Republic of German-Austria was to prove short lived. The proposed merger with the German Empire (Weimar Republic) was vetoed by the Allied victors in the Treaty of Saint-Germain-en-Laye (10 September 1919) under Article 88 which prohibited economic or political union. The allies were fearful of the long-held Mitteleuropa dream—a union of all German-speaking populations. The treaty was ratified by parliament on 21 October 1919. Austria was to remain independent, and was obliged to be so for at least 20 years.

The treaty also obliged the country to change its name from the "Republic of German Austria" to the "Republic of Austria", i.e., the First Republic, a name that persists to this day. The German-speaking bordering areas of Bohemia and Moravia (later called the "Sudetenland") were allocated to the newly founded Czechoslovakia. Many ethnic Germans regarded this as hypocrisy since U.S. president Woodrow Wilson had proclaimed in his famous "Fourteen Points" the "right of self-determination" for all nations. In Germany, the constitution of the Weimar Republic explicitly stated this in article 61: Deutschösterreich erhält nach seinem Anschluß an das Deutsche Reich das Recht der Teilnahme am Reichsrat mit der seiner Bevölkerung entsprechenden Stimmenzahl. Bis dahin haben die Vertreter Deutschösterreichs beratende Stimme.—"German Austria has the right to participate in the German Reichsrat (the constitutional representation of the federal German states) with a consulting role according to its number of inhabitants until unification with Germany." In Austria itself, almost all political parties together with the majority of public opinion continued to cling to the concept of unification laid out in Article 2 of the 1918 constitution.

Although Austria-Hungary had been one of the Central Powers, the allied victors were much more lenient with a defeated Austria than with either Germany or Hungary. Representatives of the new Republic of Austria convinced the allies that it was unfair to penalize Austria for the actions of a now dissolved Empire, especially as other areas of the Empire were now perceived to be on the "victor" side, simply because they had renounced the Empire at the end of the war. Austria never did have to pay reparations because allied commissions determined that the country could not afford to pay.

However, the Treaty of Saint Germain also confirmed Austria's loss of significant German-speaking territories, in particular the southern part of the County of Tyrol (now South Tyrol) to Italy and the German-speaking areas within Bohemia and Moravia to Czechoslovakia. In compensation (as it were) it was to be awarded most of the German-speaking part of Hungary in the Treaty of Trianon concluded between the Allies and that country; this was constituted the new federal state of Burgenland.

==== End of grand coalition and new constitution (1920–1933) ====
The grand coalition was dissolved on 10 June 1920, being replaced by a CS- SDAPÖ coalition under Michael Mayr as Chancellor (7 July 1920 – 21 June 1921), necessitating new elections which were held on 17 October, for what now became the National Council, under the new constitution of 1 October. This resulted in the Christian Social party now emerging as the strongest party, with 42% of the votes and subsequently forming Mayr's second government on 22 October as a CS minority government (with the support of the GDVP) without the Social Democrats. The CS were to continue in power until the end of the first republic, in various combinations of coalitions with the GDVP and Landbund (founded 1919).

The borders continued to be somewhat uncertain because of plebiscites in the tradition of Woodrow Wilson. Plebiscites in the regions of Tyrol and Salzburg between 1919 and 1921 (Tyrol 24 April 1921, Salzburg 29 May 1921) yielded majorities of 98% and 99% in favour of unification with Germany, fearing that "rump" Austria was not economically viable. However such mergers were not possible under the treaty.

On 20 October 1920, a plebiscite in part of the Austrian state of Carinthia was held in which the population chose to remain a part of Austria, rejecting the territorial claims of the Kingdom of Serbs, Croats and Slovenes to the state. Mostly German-speaking parts of western Hungary was awarded to Austria as the new province Burgenland in 1921, with the exception of the city of Sopron and adjacent territories, whose population decided in a referendum (which is sometimes considered by Austrians to have been rigged) to remain with Hungary. The area had been discussed as the site of a Slavic corridor uniting Czechoslovakia to Yugoslavia. This made Austria the only defeated country to acquire additional territory as part of border adjustments.

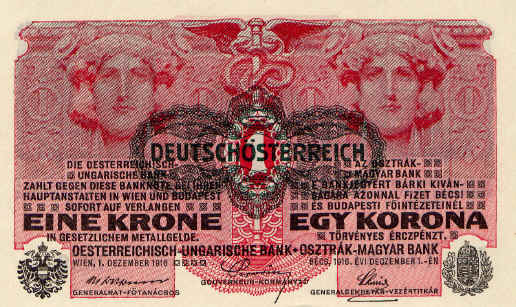
Hyperinflation led to a change of currency from the old Krone (here marked as German-Austrian) to the new Schilling in 1925

Despite the absence of reparations, Austria under the coalition suffered hyperinflation similar to that of Germany, destroying some of the financial assets of the middle and upper classes, and disrupting the economy. Adam Ferguson attributes hyperinflation to the existence of far too many people on the government payroll, failure to tax the working class, and numerous money losing government enterprises. The conservatives blamed the left for the hyperinflation; Ferguson blames policies associated with the left. Massive riots ensued in Vienna in which the rioters demanded higher taxes on the rich and reduced subsidies to the poor. In response to the riots, the government increased taxes but failed to reduce subsidies.

The terms of the Treaty of Saint Germain were further underlined by the Geneva Protocols of the League of Nations (which Austria joined on 16 December 1920) on 4 October 1922 between Austria and the Allies. Austria was given a guarantee of sovereignty provided it did not unite with Germany over the following 20 years. Austria also received a loan of 650 million Goldkronen which was successful in halting hyperinflation, but required major restructuring of the Austrian economy. The Goldkrone was replaced by the more stable Schilling, but resulted in unemployment and new taxes, loss of social benefits and major attrition of the public service.

The First World Congress of Jewish Women was held in Vienna in May 1923.

=== Politics and government ===
Emerging from the war, Austria had two main political parties on the right and one on the left. The right was split between clericalism and nationalism. The Christian Social Party, (Christlichsoziale Partei, CS), had been founded in 1891 and achieved plurality from 1907–1911 before losing it to the socialists. Their influence had been waning in the capital, even before 1914, but became the dominant party of the First Republic, and the party of government from 1920 onwards. The CS had close ties to the Roman Catholic Church and was headed by a Catholic priest named Ignaz Seipel (1876–1932), who served twice as Chancellor (1922–1924 and 1926–1929). While in power, Seipel was working for an alliance between wealthy industrialists and the Roman Catholic Church. The CS drew its political support from conservative rural Catholics. In 1920 the Greater German People's Party (Großdeutsche Volkspartei, GDVP) was founded from the bulk of liberal and national groups and became the junior partner of the CS.

On the left the Social Democratic Workers' Party of Austria (Sozialdemokratische Arbeiterpartei Österreichs, SDAPÖ) founded in 1898, which pursued a fairly left-wing course known as Austromarxism at that time, could count on a secure majority in "Red Vienna" (as the capital was known from 1918 to 1934), while right-wing parties controlled all other states. The SDAPÖ were the strongest voting bloc from 1911 to 1918.

Between 1918 and 1920, there was a grand coalition government including both left and right-wing parties, the CS and the Social Democratic Workers' Party. This gave the Social Democrats their first opportunity to influence Austrian politics. The coalition enacted progressive socio-economic and labour legislation such as the vote for women on 27 November 1918, but collapsed on 22 October 1920. In 1920, the modern Constitution of Austria was enacted, but from 1920 onwards Austrian politics were characterized by intense and sometimes violent conflict between left and right. The bourgeois parties maintained their dominance but formed unstable governments while socialists remained the largest elected party numerically.

Both right-wing and left-wing paramilitary forces were created during the 20s. The Heimwehr (Home Resistance) first appeared on 12 May 1920 and became progressively organised over the next three years and the Republikanischer Schutzbund was formed in response to this on 19 February 1923. From 2 April 1923 to 30 September there were violent clashes between Socialists and Nazis in Vienna. That on 2 April, referred to as Schlacht auf dem Exelberg (Battle of Exelberg), involved 300 Nazis against 90 Socialists. Further episodes occurred on 4 May and 30 September 1923. A clash between those groups in Schattendorf, Burgenland, on 30 January 1927 led to the death of a man and a child. Right-wing veterans were indicted at a court in Vienna, but acquitted in a jury trial. This led to massive protests and a fire at the Justizpalast in Vienna. In the July Revolt of 1927, 89 protesters were killed by the Austrian police forces.

Political conflict escalated until the early 1930s. The elections of 1930 which returned the Social Democrats as the largest bloc turned out to be the last till after World War II. On 20 May 1932, Engelbert Dollfuß, Christian Social Party Agriculture Minister became Chancellor, with a majority of one.

== Federal State of Austria (1933–1938) ==
=== Engelbert Dollfuss (1933–1934) ===
==== 1933: Dissolution of parliament and the formation of the Patriotic Front ====
Dollfuss and the Christian Social Party, moved Austria rapidly towards centralized power similar to the Fascist model. He was concerned that German National Socialist leader Adolf Hitler had become Chancellor of Germany on 30 January 1933, after his party had become the largest group in the parliament and was quickly assuming absolute power. Similarly the Austrian National Socialists (DNSAP) could easily become a significant minority in future Austrian elections. Fascism scholar Stanley G. Payne, estimated that if elections had been held in 1933, the DNSAP could have secured about 25% of the votes. Time magazine suggested an even higher level of support of 50%, with a 75% approval rate in the Tyrol region bordering Nazi Germany. The events in Austria during March 1933 echoed those of Germany, where Hitler also effectively installed himself as dictator in the same month.

===== March coup d'état =====
On 4 March 1933, there occurred an irregularity in the parliamentary voting procedures. Karl Renner (Social Democratic Party of Austria, Sozialdemokratische Partei Österreichs SPÖ), president of the National Council (Nationalrat: lower house of parliament) resigned in order to be able to cast a vote on a controversial proposal to deal with the railroad strike that was likely to pass by a very small margin, which he was not able to do while holding that office. Consequently, the two vice-presidents representing the other parties, Rudolf Ramek (Christian Social Party) and Sepp Straffner (Greater German People's Party) also resigned for the same reason. In the absence of the President the session could not be concluded.

Although there were procedural rules which could have been followed in this unprecedented and unforeseen event, the Dollfuss cabinet seized the opportunity to declare the parliament unable to function. While Dollfuss described this event as "self-elimination of Parliament" it was actually the beginning of a coup d'etat that would establish the "Ständestaat" lasting to 1938.

Using an emergency provision enacted during the First World War, the Economic War Powers Act (Kriegswirtschaftliches Ermächtigungsgesetz, KWEG 24. Juli 1917 RGBl. Nr. 307) the executive assumed legislative power on 7 March and advised President Wilhelm Miklas to issue a decree adjourning it indefinitely. The First Republic and democratic government therefore effectively ended in Austria, leaving Dollfuss to govern as a dictator with absolute powers. Immediate measures included removing the right of public assembly and freedom of the press. The opposition accused him of violating the constitution.

An attempt by the Greater German People's Party and the Social Democrats to reconvene the council on 15 March was prevented by barring the entrance with police and advising President Wilhelm Miklas to adjourn it indefinitely. Dollfuss would have been aware that Nazi troops had seized power in neighbouring Bavaria on 9 March. Finally, on 31 March, the Republikanischer Schutzbund (paramilitary arm of the Social Democratic Party) was dissolved (but continued illegally).

===== Subsequent events =====
Dollfuss then met with Benito Mussolini for the first time in Rome on 13 April. On 23 April, the National Socialists (DNSAP) gained 40 per cent of the vote in the Innsbruck communal elections, becoming the largest voting bloc, so in May all state and communal elections were banned.

On 20 May 1933, Dollfuss replaced the "Democratic Republic" with a new entity, merging his Christian Social Party with elements of other nationalist and conservative groups, including the Heimwehr, which encompassed many workers who were unhappy with the radical leadership of the socialist party, to form the Patriotic Front (Vaterländische Front), though the Heimwehr continued to exist as an independent organization until 1936, when Dollfuss' successor Kurt von Schuschnigg forcibly merged it into the Front, instead creating the unabidingly loyal Frontmiliz as a paramilitary task force. The new entity was allegedly bipartisan and represented those who were "loyal to the government".

The DNSAP was banned in June 1933. Dollfuss was also aware of the Soviet Union's increasing influence in Europe throughout the 1920s and early 1930s, and also banned the communists, establishing a one-party conservative dictatorship largely modeled after Italian fascism, tied to Catholic corporatism and anti-secularism. He dropped all pretence of Austrian reunification with Germany so long as the Nazi Party remained in power there.

Although all Austrian parties, including the Social Democratic Labour Party (SDAPÖ) were banned, Social Democrats continued to exist as an independent organization, including its paramilitary Republikaner Schutzbund, which could muster tens of thousands against Dollfuss' government.

In August 1933, Mussolini's government issued a guarantee of Austrian independence ("if necessary, Italy would defend Austria's independence by force of arms"). Dollfuss also exchanged 'Secret Letters' with Benito Mussolini about ways to guarantee Austrian independence. Mussolini was interested in Austria forming a buffer zone against Nazi Germany. Dollfuss always stressed the similarity of the regimes of Hitler in Germany and Joseph Stalin in the Soviet Union, and was convinced that Austria and Italy could counter totalitarian national socialism and communism in Europe.

Dollfuss escaped an assassination attempt in October 1933 by Rudolf Dertil, a 22-year-old who had been ejected from the military for his national socialist views.

==== 1934: Civil war and assassination ====
Despite the March coup d'état, the SPÖ continued to seek a peaceful resolution, but when the government tried to search the party's office in Linz for weapons on 12 February 1934, members of the Schutzbund fought back. The resistance spread and became the Austrian Civil War, in which the weakened party and its supporters were quickly defeated and the party and its various ancillary organisations were banned.

On 1 May 1934, the Dollfuss cabinet approved a new constitution that abolished freedom of the press, established one party system and created a total state monopoly on employer-employee relations. This system remained in force until Austria became part of Nazi Germany in 1938. The Patriotic Front government frustrated the ambitions of pro-Hitlerite sympathizers in Austria who wished both political influence and unification with Germany, leading to Dollfuss' assassination by a group of Nazis on 25 July 1934.

=== Kurt Schuschnigg (1934–1938) ===
His successor Kurt Schuschnigg maintained the ban on pro-Hitlerite activities in Austria, but was forced to resign on 11 March 1938 following a demand by Adolf Hitler for power-sharing with pro-German circles. Following Schuschnigg's resignation, German troops occupied Austria with no resistance.

== Anschluss and unification with Germany (1938–1945) ==
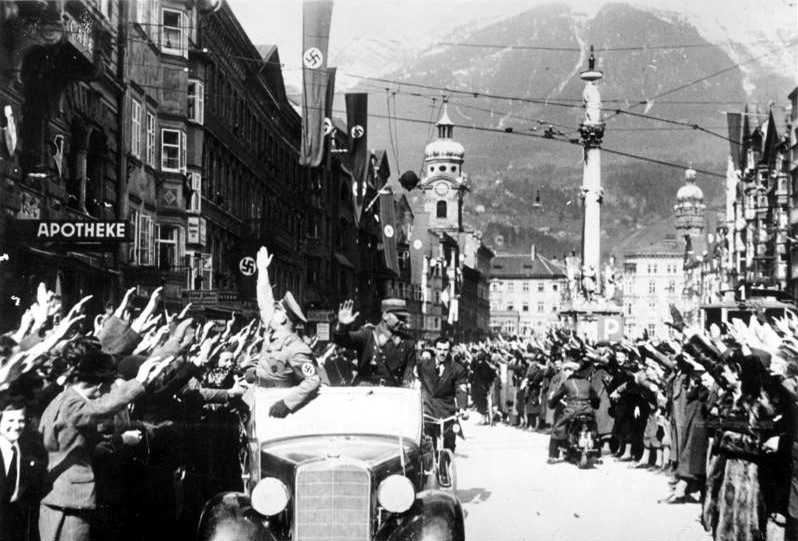
Some residents of Innsbruck welcomed the German troops after the Anschluss on 13 March 1938

Although the Treaty of Versailles and the Treaty of St. Germain had explicitly forbidden the unification of Austria and Germany, the native Austrian Hitler was vastly striving to annex Austria during the late 1930s, which was fiercely resisted by the Austrian Schuschnigg dictatorship. When the conflict was escalating in early 1938, Chancellor Schuschnigg announced a plebiscite on the issue on 9 March, which was to take place on 13 March. On 12 March, German troops entered Austria, who met celebrating crowds, in order to install Nazi puppet Arthur Seyss-Inquart as Chancellor. With a Nazi administration already in place the country was now integrated into Nazi Germany renamed as "Ostmark" until 1942, when it was renamed again as "Alpen-und Donau-Reichsgaue" ("Alpine and Danubian Gaue"). A rigged referendum on 10 April was used to demonstrate the alleged approval of the annexation with a majority of 99.73% for the annexation.

As a result, Austria ceased to exist as an independent country. This annexation was enforced by military invasion but large parts of the Austrian population were in favour of the Nazi regime, and many Austrians participated in its crimes. The Jews, Communists, Socialist and hostile politicians were sent to concentration camps, murdered or forced into exile.

Just before the end of the war, on 28 March 1945, American troops entered Austria and the Soviet Union's Red Army crossed the eastern border two days later, taking Vienna on 13 April. American and British forces occupied the western and southern regions, preventing Soviet forces from completely overrunning and controlling the country.

== The Second Republic (since 1945) ==
=== Allied occupation ===
According to the plans by Winston Churchill, a south German state would be formed including Austria and Bavaria.

Occupation zones in Austria

However, in April 1945 Karl Renner, an Austrian elder statesman, declared Austria separate from the other German-speaking lands and set up a government which included socialists, conservatives and communists. A significant number of these were returning from exile or Nazi detention, having thus played no role in the Nazi government. This contributed to the Allies' treating Austria more as a liberated, rather than defeated, country, and the government was recognized by the Allies later that year. The country was occupied by the Allies from 9 May 1945, and under the Allied Commission for Austria established by an agreement on 4 July 1945, it was divided into Zones occupied respectively by American, British, French and Soviet Army personnel, with Vienna being also divided similarly into four sectors, with an International Zone at its heart.

Though under occupation, this Austrian government was officially permitted to conduct foreign relations with the approval of the Four Occupying Powers under the agreement of 28 June 1946. As part of this trend, Austria was one of the founding members of the Danube Commission, which was formed on 18 August 1948. Austria would benefit from the Marshall Plan, but economic recovery was slow.

Unlike the First Republic, which had been characterized by sometimes violent conflict between the different political groups, the Second Republic became a stable democracy. The two largest leading parties, the Christian-democratic Austrian People's Party (ÖVP) and the Social Democratic Party (SPÖ), remained in a coalition led by the ÖVP until 1966. The Communist Party of Austria (KPÖ), who had hardly any support in the Austrian electorate, remained in the coalition until 1950 and in parliament until the 1959 election. For much of the Second Republic, the only opposition party was the Freedom Party of Austria (FPÖ), which included German nationalist and liberal political currents. It was founded in 1955 as a successor organisation to the short-lived Federation of Independents (VdU).

The United States countered starvation in 1945–46 with emergency supplies of food delivered by the US Army, by the United Nations Relief and Rehabilitation Administration (UNRRA), and by the privately organized Cooperative for American Remittances to Europe (CARE). Starting in 1947, it funded the Austrian trade deficit. Large-scale Marshall Plan aid began in 1948 and operated in close cooperation with the Austrian government. However, tensions arose when Austria—which never joined NATO—was ineligible for the American shift toward rearmament in military spending. The US was also successful in helping Austrian popular culture adopt American models. In journalism, for example, it sent in hundreds of experts (and controlled the newsprint), closed down the old party-line newspapers, introduced advertising and wire services, and trained reporters and editors, as well as production workers. It founded the Wiener Kurier, which became popular, as well as many magazines such as Medical News from the United States, which informed doctors on new treatments and drugs. The Americans also thoroughly revamped the radio stations, in part with the goal of countering the Soviet-controlled stations. On an even larger scale the education system was modernized and democratized by American experts.

=== Independence and political development during the Second Republic ===
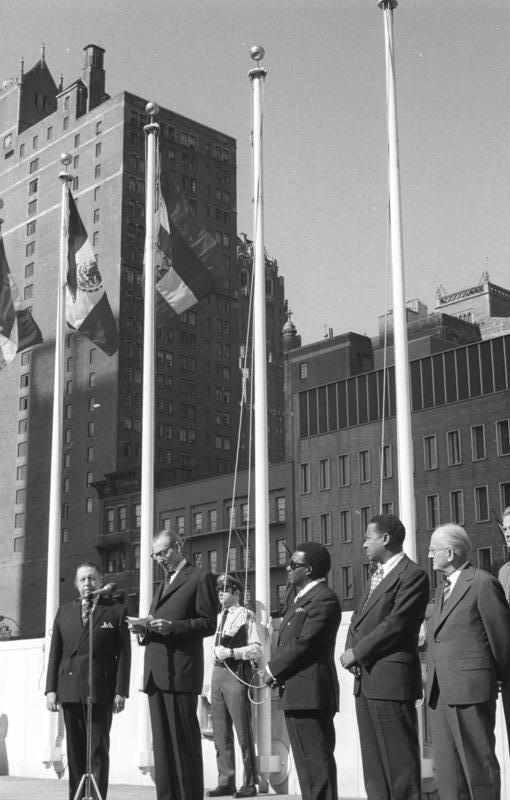
Kurt Waldheim, Secretary General of United Nations. He became a president of Austria (1986–1992).

The two major parties strove towards ending allied occupation and restoring a fully independent Austria. The Austrian State Treaty was signed on 15 May 1955. Upon the termination of allied occupation, Austria was proclaimed a neutral country, and everlasting neutrality was incorporated into the Constitution on 26 October 1955.

The post-war years witnessed a big rise in the average of standard of living, which was reflected in the possession by households of a variety of consumer goods. In 1977, for example, 65% of households had a car, 79% a washing machine, 82% a vacuum cleaner, 75% a food mixer, 65% a still camera, 90% a television, 35% a cassette recorder and 94% a transistor radio, while in 1976 22% of households had a radio recorder, 42% a tape recorder, and 39% a record player.

The political system of the Second Republic came to be characterized by the system of Proporz, meaning that posts of some political importance were split evenly between members of the SPÖ and ÖVP. Interest group representations with mandatory membership (e.g., for workers, businesspeople, farmers etc.) grew to considerable importance and were usually consulted in the legislative process, so that hardly any legislation was passed that did not reflect widespread consensus. The Proporz and consensus systems largely held even during the years between 1966 and 1983, when there were non-coalition governments.

The ÖVP-SPÖ coalition ended in March 1966, when the ÖVP gained a majority in the National Council. Josef Klaus (ÖVP) formed his second cabinett (de). The ÖVP lost its majority of seats in March 1970, when SPÖ leader Bruno Kreisky formed a minority government (de) tolerated by the FPÖ. In the elections of 1971, of 1975 and of 1979 he obtained an absolute majority. The 1970s were then seen as a time of liberal reforms in social policy. Later, the economic policies of the Kreisky era often have been criticized, as the accumulation of a large national debt began, and non-profitable nationalized industries were strongly subsidized.

Following severe losses in the April 1983 election, the SPÖ entered into a coalition with the FPÖ under the leadership of Fred Sinowatz (de). In Spring 1986, Kurt Waldheim was elected president amid considerable national and international protest because of his possible involvement with the Nazi regime and war crimes during World War II. Fred Sinowatz resigned in June 1986. Franz Vranitzky became chancellor and formed his first government (de).

In September 1986, in a confrontation between the German-national and liberal wings, Jörg Haider became leader of the FPÖ. Chancellor Vranitzky rescinded the coalition pact between FPÖ and SPÖ, and after a snap election on 23 November 1986, entered into a coalition with the ÖVP, which was then led by Alois Mock. Vranitzki formed a second (de), a third (de) and a fourth government (de ). Jörg Haider's populism and criticism of the Proporz system allowed him to gradually expand his party's support in elections, rising from 4% in 1983 to 27% in 1999. From 1986 onwards, the Green Party has been elected to every National council.

=== Since 1989/90 ===
As the 1980s ended, and the 1990s began, the Eastern Bloc came to a swift end, and the Cold War with it. Austria's neighbours Hungary, Czechoslovakia, and, from 1991, Slovenia, became independent, improving the economy.

The SPÖ–ÖVP coalition persisted until 1999. On 1 January 1995, Austria, Sweden and Finland joined the European Union (Video of the signing in 1994), and Austria was set on the track towards joining the Eurozone, when it was established on 1 January 1999.

In 1993, the Liberal Forum was founded by dissidents from the FPÖ. It managed to remain in parliament until 1999. Viktor Klima succeeded Vranitzky as chancellor in 1997 (de).

In 1999, the ÖVP fell back to third place behind the FPÖ in the elections. Even though ÖVP chairman and Vice Chancellor Wolfgang Schüssel had announced that his party would go into opposition in that case, he entered into a coalition with the FPÖ—with himself as chancellor—in early 2000 under considerable national and international outcry. Jörg Haider resigned as FPÖ chairman, but retained his post as governor of Carinthia and kept substantial influence within the FPÖ.

In 2002, disputes within the FPÖ resulting from losses in state elections caused the resignation of several FPÖ government members and a collapse of the Schüssel government. Schüssel's ÖVP emerged as the winner of the snap election in October 2002, ending up in first place for the first time since 1966. The FPÖ lost more than half of its voters, but reentered the coalition with the ÖVP. Despite the new coalition, the voter support for the FPÖ continued to dwindle in almost all local and state elections. Disputes between "nationalist" and "liberals" wings of the party resulted in a split, with the founding of a new liberal party called the Alliance for the Future of Austria (BZÖ) and led by Jörg Haider. Since all FPÖ government members and most FPÖ members of parliament decided to join the new party, the Schüssel coalition remained in office (now in the constellation ÖVP–BZÖ, with the remaining FPÖ in opposition) until the next elections. On 1 October 2006 the SPÖ won a head on head elections and negotiated a grand coalition with the ÖVP. This coalition started its term on 11 January 2007 with Alfred Gusenbauer as Chancellor of Austria. For the first time, the Green Party of Austria became the third-largest party in a nationwide election, overtaking the FPÖ by a narrow margin of only a few hundred votes.

The SPÖ-ÖVP coalition headed by Gusenbauer collapsed in the early summer of 2008 over disagreements about the country's EU policy. The early elections held on 28 September resulted in extensive losses for the two ruling parties and corresponding gains for Heinz-Christian Strache's FPÖ and Jörg Haider's BZÖ (the Green Party was relegated to the 5th position). Nevertheless, SPÖ and ÖVP renewed their coalition under the leadership of the new SPÖ party chairman Werner Faymann. Gusenbauer dissolved his first government on 8 December 2008; the first Faymann government followed.

In 2008 Haider died in a controversial car accident and was succeeded as BZÖ party chairman by Herbert Scheibner and as governor of Carinthia by Gerhard Dörfler.

In the legislative election of September 2013, SPÖ received 27% of the vote and 52 seats; ÖVP 24% and 47 seats, thus controlling together the majority of the seats. FPÖ received 40 seats and 21% of the votes, while the Greens received 12% and 24 seats. Two new parties, Stronach and the NEOS, received less than 10% of the vote, and 11 and nine seats respectively.

On 17 May 2016, Christian Kern (SPÖ) was sworn in as new chancellor. He continued governing in a "grand coalition" with ÖVP (Kern government). He took the office after Werner Faymann (SPÖ) had resignated.

On 26 January 2017, Alexander Van der Bellen was sworn into as the mostly ceremonial - but symbolically significant - role of Austrian president.

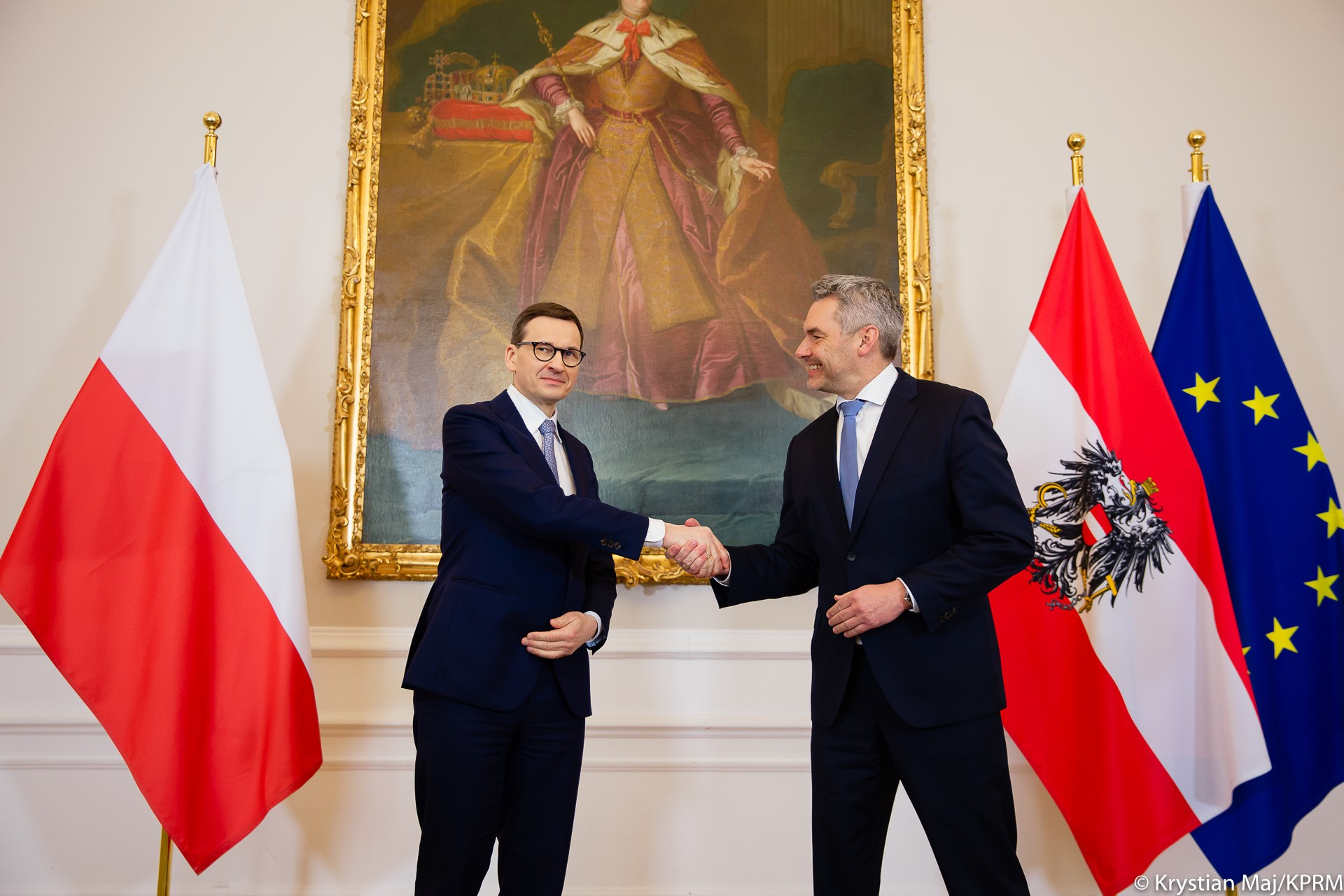
Austrian Chancellor Karl Nehammer with Polish Prime Minister Mateusz Morawiecki, 9 March 2022

After the Grand Coalition broke in Spring 2017 a snap election was proclaimed for October 2017. ÖVP with its new young leader Sebastian Kurz emerged as the largest party in the National Council, winning 31.5% of votes and 62 of the 183 seats. SPÖ finished second with 52 seats and 26.9% votes, slightly ahead of FPÖ, which received 51 seats and 26%. NEOS finished fourth with 10 seats (5.3 percent of votes), and PILZ (which split from the Green Party at the start of the campaign) entered parliament for the first (and last) time and came in fifth place with 8 seats and 4.4% The Green Party failed with 3.8% to cross the 4% threshold and was ejected from parliament, losing all of its 24 seats. The ÖVP decided to form a coalition with the FPÖ. The new government between the centre-right wing and the right-wing populist party under the new chancellor Sebastian Kurz was sworn in on 18 December 2017, but the coalition government later collapsed in the wake of the “Ibiza” corruption scandal and a new election was called for 29 September 2019. The elections lead to another landslide victory (37.5%) of the ÖVP who formed a coalition-government with the reinvigorated (13.9%) Greens, which was sworn in with Kurz as chancellor on 7 January 2020 (second Kurz government).

On 11 October 2021, Chancellor Kurz resigned, after pressure triggered by a corruption scandal. Foreign Minister Alexander Schallenberg of ÖVP succeeded him as chancellor (Schallenberg government). Following a corruption scandal involving the ruling ÖVP, Austria got its third conservative chancellor in two months after Karl Nehammer was sworn into office on 6 December 2021. His predecessor Schallenberg had left the office after less than two months. ÖVP and the Greens continued to govern together (Nehammer government).

== See also ==
=== Articles ===
==== Austria ====
- Archduchy of Austria
- Austria-Hungary
- Austria under National Socialism
- Austrian Empire
- Duchy of Austria
- Elections in Austria
- Habsburg monarchy
- History of Vienna
- Name of Austria
- Politics of Austria
- Timeline of Austrian history

==== Other ====
- History of Bavaria
- History of Croatia
- History of the Czech Republic
- History of Europe
- History of Germany
- History of Hungary
- History of Italy
- History of Serbia
- History of Slovenia
- History of Slovakia
- History of Switzerland
- Holy Roman Empire
- Holy Roman Emperors
- Kingdom of Germany
- King of the Romans

=== Lists ===
- List of famous Austrians
- List of German monarchs
- List of rulers of Austria
- List of Austrian consorts
- List of Holy Roman emperors
- List of Holy Roman empresses
- List of chancellors of Austria
- List of presidents of Austria
- List of minister-presidents of Austria
- List of foreign ministers of Austria-Hungary
- List of political parties in Austria

== Works cited ==
- Alföldy, Géza (1974). Noricum. Routledge & K. Paul. ISBN 978-1-3177-0092-0.
- Beller, Steven (2006). A Concise History of Austria. Cambridge University Press. ISBN 978-0-5214-7305-7. OL 3270803W.
- Bischof, Günter; Petschar, Hans (2017). The Marshall Plan: Saving Europe, Rebuilding Austria. University of New Orleans Publishing.
- Boyer, John W. (1995). Political Radicalism in Late Imperial Vienna: Origins of the Christian Social Movement, 1848–1897. University of Chicago Press. ISBN 978-0-2260-6956-2.
- Brook-Shepherd, Gordon (1997). The Austrians: A Thousand-Year Odyssey. New York: Carroll & Graf Publishers. ISBN 978-0-7867-0520-7. OL 3359797W.
- Bukey, Evan (2002). Hitler's Austria: Popular Sentiment in the Nazi Era, 1938–1945. The University of North Carolina Press. ISBN 978-0-8078-2516-7.
- Dickson, P. G. M. (1995). "Monarchy and Bureaucracy in Late Eighteenth-Century Austria". The English Historical Review. 110 (436): 323–367. doi:10.1093/ehr/CX.436.323. JSTOR 576012.
- Erbe, Michael (2000). Die Habsburger 1493–1918. Urban (in German). Kohlhammer Verlag. ISBN 978-3-1701-1866-9.
- Gale, Thomson (1998). Worldmark Encyclopedia of the Nations (9th ed.). Farmingtom Hills, Michigan: Gale. ISBN 978-0-7876-0079-2.
- Grandner, Margarete (1994). Conservative Social Politics in Austria, 1880–1890 (PDF) (Thesis). Working Paper 94-2. University of Minnesota Center for Austrian Studies. Archived from the original (PDF) on 14 January 2013.
- Gruber, Stephan (2022). "The peace-loving mother-figure versus the neurotic megalomaniac?"., in Schönbrunn 2022
- Hamann, Brigitte (2012) [1986 Knopf New York]. The Reluctant Empress: A Biography of Empress Elisabeth of Austria [Elizabeth: Kaiserin wider Willen, Amalthea Verlag, Vienna and Munich 1982]. Translated by Hein, Ruth. Faber & Faber. ISBN 978-0-5712-8756-7. (Other editions: Ullstein Buchverlage, Berlin 1998, 8th ed. 2006 ISBN 3-548-35479-3)
- Ingrao, Charles W. (2000). The Habsburg Monarchy, 1618–1815 (2nd ed.). Cambridge University Press. ISBN 978-0-5217-8505-1.
- Kann, Robert A. (1980). A History of the Habsburg Empire: 1526–1918 (2nd ed.). University of California Press. ISBN 978-0-5200-4206-3. OL 7708659M.
- Kissinger, Henry (1957). A World Restored: Metternich, Castlereagh and the Problems of Peace, 1812–22.
- Mutschlechner, Martin (2022). "The dark side of Maria Theresa"., in Schönbrunn 2022
- Pech, Stanley Z. (June 1989). "Political Parties among Austrian Slavs: A Comparative Analysis of the 1911 Reichsrat Election Results". Canadian Slavonic Papers. Essays in Honour of Peter Brock. 31 (2): 170–193. doi:10.1080/00085006.1989.11091913. JSTOR 40869049.
- Pohanka, Reinhard (2011). Austria: A History of the Country. Vienna: Pichler-Verlag in the Styria Publ. Group. ISBN 978-3-8543-1579-7. OL 44789816M.
- Pulzer, Peter (July 1969). "The Legitimizing Role of Political Parties: the Second Austrian Republic". Government and Opposition. 4 (3): 324–344. doi:10.1111/j.1477-7053.1969.tb00804.x. Archived from the original on 12 July 2015.
- Schönbrunn (2022). "Die Welt der Habsburger" [The World of the Habsburgs]. Die Welt der Habsburger. Schönbrunn Group.
- Scott, H. M. (1990). Enlightened Absolutism: Reform and Reformers in Later Eighteenth-Century Europe. Bloomsbury Publishing. ISBN 978-1-3492-0592-9. OL 17924876W.
- Steininger, Rolf; Bischof, Günter; Gehler, Michael, eds. (2008). Austria In the Twentieth Century. Transaction Publishers. ISBN 978-1-4128-0854-5.
- Encyclopædia Britannica (5 December 2022). Austria: History. Encyclopædia Britannica.
