= List of Aster species =

Aster is a genus of flowering plants in the family Asteraceae. As of August 2024 Plants of the World Online accepts 186 species.

For species formerly placed in genus Aster, see List of Aster synonyms.

- Aster ageratoides Turcz.
- Aster aitchisonii Boiss.
- Aster alatipes Hemsl.
- Aster albescens (DC.) Wall. ex Hand.-Mazz.
- Aster alpinus L.
- Aster altaicus Willd.
- Aster amellus L.
- Aster arenarius (Kitam.) Nemoto
- Aster argyropholis Hand.-Mazz.
- Aster asagrayi Makino
- Aster asteroides (DC.) Kuntze
- Aster atropurpurea W.P.Li & G.X.Chen
- Aster auriculatus Franch.
- Aster baccharoides Steetz
- Aster barbellatus Grierson
- Aster batangensis Bureau & Franch.
- Aster bellidiastrum (L.) Scop.
- Aster biennis Ledeb.
- Aster bietii Franch.
- Aster bipinnatisectus Ludlow ex Grierson
- Aster boweri Hemsl.
- Aster brachytrichus Franch.
- Aster brevicaulis W.P.Li
- Aster brevis Hand.-Mazz.
- Aster bulleyanus Jeffrey
- Aster chekiangensis (C.Ling ex Y.Ling) Y.F.Lu & X.F.Jin
- Aster chingshuiensis Y.C.Liu & C.H.Ou
- Aster chuanshanensis W.P.Li
- Aster crenatifolius Hand.-Mazz.
- Aster danyangensis Jae Y.Kim & G.Y.Chung
- Aster dianchuanensis J.W.Xiao & W.P.Li
- Aster dimorphophyllus Franch. & Sav.
- Aster diplostephioides (DC.) Benth. ex C.B.Clarke
- Aster dolichophyllus Y.Ling
- Aster dolichopodus Y.Ling
- Aster eligulatus (Y.Ling ex Y.L.Chen, S.Yun Liang & K.Y.Pan) Brouillet, Semple & Y.L.Chen
- Aster eremophilus Bunge
- Aster falconeri (C.B.Clarke) Hutch.
- Aster fanjingshanicus Y.L.Chen & D.J.Liu
- Aster farreri W.W.Sm. & Jeffrey
- Aster filipes J.Q.Fu
- Aster flaccidus Bunge
- Aster formosanus Hayata
- Aster fulgidulus Grierson
- Aster fuscescens Bureau & Franch.
- Aster giraldii Diels
- Aster glehnii F.Schmidt
- Aster gouldii C.E.C.Fisch.
- Aster gracilicaulis Y.Ling ex J.Q.Fu
- Aster guanwuensis S.S.Ying
- Aster handelii Onno
- Aster hayatae H.Lév. & Vaniot
- Aster helenae Merr.
- Aster heliopsis Grierson
- Aster hersileoides C.K.Schneid.
- Aster heterolepis Hand.-Mazz.
- Aster himalaicus C.B.Clarke
- Aster hispidus Thunb.
- Aster holohermaphroditus (Grierson) R.Abid & Qaiser
- Aster hololachnus Y.Ling ex Y.L.Chen, S.Yun Liang & K.Y.Pan
- Aster homochlamydeus Hand.-Mazz.
- Aster huangpingensis W.P.Li & Zhi Li
- Aster hunanensis Hand.-Mazz.
- Aster hypoleucus Hand.-Mazz.
- Aster iinumae Kitam.
- Aster ilanmontanus S.S.Ying
- Aster incisus Fisch.
- Aster indamellus Grierson
- Aster indicus L.
- Aster ionoglossus Y.Ling ex Y.L.Chen, S.Yun Liang & K.Y.Pan
- Aster itsunboshi Kitam.
- Aster jeffreyanus Diels
- Aster jiangkouensis X.L.Yu & Xiong Li
- Aster jiulongshanensis Z.H.Chen, X.Y.Ye & C.C.Pan
- Aster kanoi S.W.Chung, W.J.Huang & T.C.Hsu
- Aster kantoensis Kitam.
- Aster komonoensis Makino
- Aster koraiensis Nakai
- Aster labrangensis Hand.-Mazz.
- Aster langaoensis J.Q.Fu
- Aster latibracteatus Franch.
- Aster lautureanus (Debeaux) Franch.
- Aster lavandulifolius Hand.-Mazz.
- Aster likiangensis Franch.
- Aster limosus Hemsl.
- Aster lingii G.J.Zhang & T.G.Gao
- Aster lingulatus Franch.
- Aster lipskii Kom.
- Aster lixianensis (J.Q.Fu) Brouillet, Semple & Y.L.Chen
- Aster lushiensis (J.Q.Fu) Brouillet, Semple & Y.L.Chen
- Aster maackii Regel
- Aster mangshanensis Y.Ling
- Aster marchandii H.Lév.
- Aster medius (Krylov) Serg.
- Aster megalanthus Y.Ling
- Aster menelii H.Lév.
- Aster meyendorffii (Regel & Maack) Voss
- Aster microcephalus (Miq.) Franch. & Sav.
- Aster miquelianus H.Hara
- Aster miyagii Koidz.
- Aster molliusculus (Lindl. ex DC.) C.B.Clarke
- Aster mongolicus Franch.
- Aster morrisonensis Hayata
- Aster motuoensis Y.L.Chen
- Aster moupinensis (Franch.) Hand.-Mazz.
- Aster nakaoi Kitam.
- Aster neoelegans Grierson
- Aster nigromontanus Dunn
- Aster nitidus C.C.Chang
- Aster oldhamii Hemsl.
- Aster oliganthus W.P.Li & Zhi Li
- Aster oreophilus Franch.
- Aster ovalifolius Kitam.
- Aster panduratus Nees ex Walp.
- Aster pekinensis (Hance) F.H.Chen
- Aster philippinensis S.Moore
- Aster piccolii Hook.f.
- Aster poliothamnus Diels
- Aster polius C.K.Schneid.
- Aster popovii Botsch.
- Aster prainii (J.R.Drumm.) Y.L.Chen
- Aster procerus Hemsl.
- Aster pseudosimplex Brouillet, Semple & Y.L.Chen
- Aster pujosii Quézel
- Aster pycnophyllus Franch. ex W.W.Sm.
- Aster pyrenaeus Desf. ex DC.
- Aster quanzhouensis M.Tang, G.J.Yan & W.P.Li
- Aster retusus Ludlow
- Aster rockianus Hand.-Mazz.
- Aster rugulosus Maxim.
- Aster salwinensis Onno
- Aster sampsonii Hemsl.
- Aster sanczirii Kamelin & Gubanov
- Aster sanqingshanicus J.W.Xiao & W.P.Li
- Aster satsumensis Soejima
- Aster savatieri Makino
- Aster saxicola W.P.Li & Z.Li
- Aster scaber Thunb.
- Aster × sekimotoi Makino
- Aster semiamplexicaulis (Makino) Makino ex Koidz.
- Aster semiprostratus (Grierson) H.Ikeda
- Aster senecioides Franch.
- Aster setchuenensis Franch.
- Aster shimadae (Kitam.) Nemoto
- Aster sikkimensis Hook.f. & Thomson
- Aster sikuensis W.W.Sm. & Farrer
- Aster sinianus Hand.-Mazz.
- Aster sinoangustifolius Brouillet, Semple & Y.L.Chen
- Aster siyuanensis S.S.Ying
- Aster smithianus Hand.-Mazz.
- Aster sohayakiensis Koidz.
- Aster souliei Franch.
- Aster spathulifolius Maxim.
- Aster sphaerotus Y.Ling
- Aster stracheyi Hook.f.
- Aster sugimotoi Kitam.
- Aster taiwanensis Kitam.
- Aster takasago-montanus Sasaki
- Aster taliangshanensis Y.Ling
- Aster taoshanensis S.S.Ying
- Aster taoyuenensis S.S.Ying
- Aster tataricus L.f.
- Aster techinensis Y.Ling
- Aster tenuipes Makino
- Aster tianmenshanensis G.J.Zhang & T.G.Gao
- Aster tientschwanensis Hand.-Mazz.
- Aster tonglingensis G.J.Zhang & T.G.Gao
- Aster tongolensis Franch.
- Aster tricephalus C.B.Clarke
- Aster trichoneurus Y.Ling
- Aster trinervius Roxb. ex D.Don
- Aster turbinatus S.Moore
- Aster velutinosus Y.Ling
- Aster verticillatus (Reinw.) Brouillet, Semple & Y.L.Chen
- Aster vestitus Franch.
- Aster viscidulus (Makino) Makino
- Aster vvedenskyi Bondarenko
- Aster wattii C.B.Clarke
- Aster willkommii Sch.Bip.
- Aster woroschilovii Zdor. & I.I.Shapoval
- Aster xianjuensis Y.F.Lu, W.Y.Xie & X.F.Jin
- Aster yakushimensis (Kitam.) Soejima & Yahara
- Aster yamazutae Matsuda
- Aster yomena (Kitam.) Honda
- Aster yoshinaganus (Kitam.) Mot.Ito & Soejima
- Aster yuanqunensis (J.Q.Fu) Brouillet, Semple & Y.L.Chen
- Aster yunnanensis Franch.
