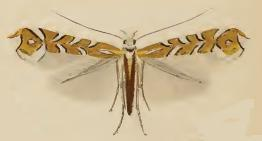

Scientific classification
- Kingdom: Animalia
- Phylum: Arthropoda
- Clade: Pancrustacea
- Class: Insecta
- Order: Lepidoptera
- Family: Gracillariidae
- Genus: Aristaea
- Species: A. pavoniella

Binomial name
- Aristaea pavoniella (Zeller, 1847)

Synonyms
- Gracilaria pavoniella Zeller, 1847; Micrurapteryx pavoniella

= Aristaea pavoniella =

Species of moth

Aristaea pavoniella is a moth of the family Gracillariidae. It is found from Germany and Poland to Italy, as well as central and southern Russia.

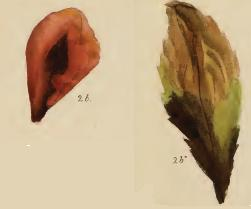
Mined leaves of Aster bellidiastrum (2b, 2b*)

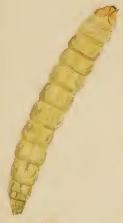
Larva

The wingspan is 8–10 mm.

The larvae feed on Aster alpinus, Aster amellus and Aster bellidiastrum. They mine the leaves of their host plant.
