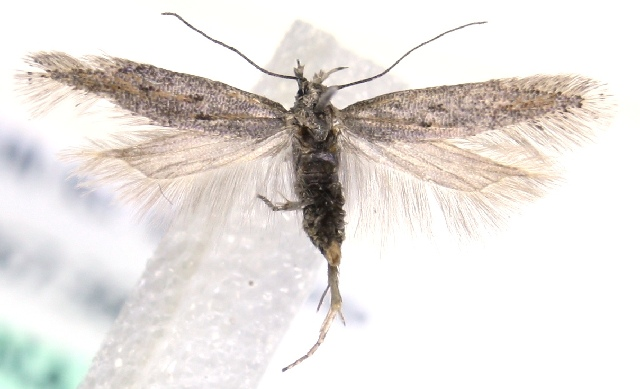

Scientific classification
- Kingdom: Animalia
- Phylum: Arthropoda
- Class: Insecta
- Order: Lepidoptera
- Family: Gelechiidae
- Genus: Scrobipalpula
- Species: S. diffluella

Binomial name
- Scrobipalpula diffluella (Frey, 1870)

Synonyms
- Gelechia diffluella Frey, 1870; Gnorimoschema diffluellum; Gelechia cacuminum Frey, 1870; Scrobipalpula cacuminum; Gnorimoschema uniflorellum Klimesch, 1957; Lita diffluella Heinemann, 1870; Phthorimaea diffluella var. bellidiastri Klimesch, 1951

= Scrobipalpula diffluella =

Species of moth

Scrobipalpula diffluella, the Essex groundling, is a moth of the family Gelechiidae. It is found in northern Europe (from Norway to Latvia and Finland), and central Europe (the Alps). There are scattered records from Great Britain and the Balkan Peninsula.

The wingspan is 11–12 mm.

The larvae feed on Aster alpinus, Aster amellus, Aster bellidiastrum, Erigeron acer (including subspecies politus), Erigeron uniflorus and Homogyne alpina. They mine the leaves of their host plant. Pupation takes place outside of the mine. Larvae can be found in June.
