= Hellinsia kuwayamai =

Scientific classification
- Domain: Eukaryota
- Kingdom: Animalia
- Phylum: Arthropoda
- Class: Insecta
- Order: Lepidoptera
- Family: Pterophoridae
- Genus: Hellinsia
- Species: H. kuwayamai

Binomial name
- Hellinsia kuwayamai (Matsumura, 1931)

Synonyms
- Pterophorus kuwayamai Matsumura, 1931; Oidaematophorus kuwayamai

Species of plume moth

Hellinsia kuwayamai is a moth of the family Pterophoridae. It is known from Japan (Hokkaido, Honshu, Kyushu), Korea and China.

The wingspan is about 16 mm and the length of the forewings is 8–9 mm.

The larvae feed on Aster ageratoides and Aster yomena.
