= Coleophora amellivora =

Scientific classification
- Kingdom: Animalia
- Phylum: Arthropoda
- Clade: Pancrustacea
- Class: Insecta
- Order: Lepidoptera
- Family: Coleophoridae
- Genus: Coleophora
- Species: C. amellivora

Binomial name
- Coleophora amellivora Baldizzone, 1979

Synonyms
- Coleophora calcariella Toll, 1962

Species of moth

Coleophora amellivora is a moth of the family Coleophoridae. It is found from Fennoscandia to the Pyrenees, Italy and Romania and from France to Poland.

The larvae feed on Aster alpinus, Aster amellus, Aster linosyris and Aster salignus. Larvae can be found from September to May. After hibernation, the larvae do not feed.
