= Coleophora molothrella =

Scientific classification
- Kingdom: Animalia
- Phylum: Arthropoda
- Clade: Pancrustacea
- Class: Insecta
- Order: Lepidoptera
- Family: Coleophoridae
- Genus: Coleophora
- Species: C. molothrella

Binomial name
- Coleophora molothrella Baldizzone & Oku, 1988

Species of moth

Coleophora molothrella is a moth of the family Coleophoridae. It is found on Honshu island of Japan.

The wingspan is 10–12 mm (0.39–0.47 in). Adults are on wing from late July to August.

The larvae feed on the leaves of Aster glehni, Aster ageratoides and Kalimeris pinnatifida.
