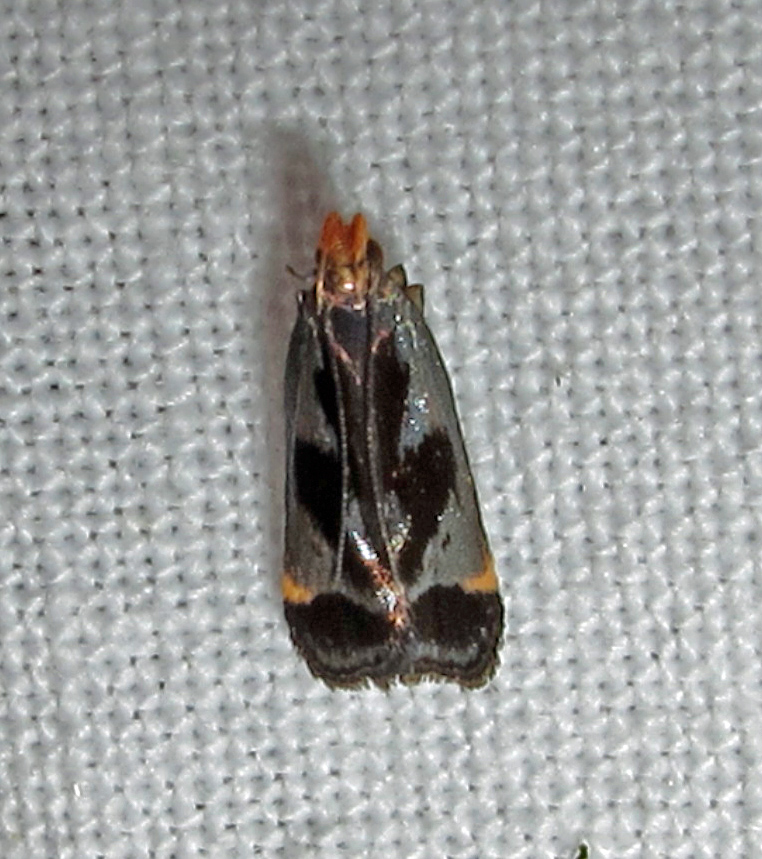

Scientific classification
- Kingdom: Animalia
- Phylum: Arthropoda
- Clade: Pancrustacea
- Class: Insecta
- Order: Lepidoptera
- Family: Gelechiidae
- Genus: Dichomeris
- Species: D. ochripalpella

Binomial name
- Dichomeris ochripalpella (Zeller, 1873)

Synonyms
- Gelechia (Trichotaphe) ochripalpella Zeller, 1873; Trichotaphe alacella Clemens, 1862; Gelechia goodellella Chambers, 1881

= Dichomeris ochripalpella =

Shining dichomeris moth

Species of moth

Dichomeris ochripalpella, the shining dichomeris moth, is a moth in the family Gelechiidae. It was described by Philipp Christoph Zeller in 1873. It is found in North America, where it has been recorded from southern Quebec and southern Ontario to New Jersey, North Carolina and Arkansas.

The length of the forewings is 5.4–6.5 mm (0.21–0.26 in). The forewings are deep brown, with a steel-blue, shining streak along the costa, extending from the base to an orange-yellow costal spot at the beginning of the apical cilia, and deeply excised in the middle of the wing. Beneath the excised portion and near the inner margin is a short, steel-blue streak, and the costal streak emits a slender line to the inner margin, opposite the costal orange-yellow spot. The hindmargin has a series of steel-blue dots. The hindwings are fuscous. Adults are on wing from June to August.

The larvae feed on Aster and Solidago species.
