= Coleophora seminella =

Scientific classification
- Kingdom: Animalia
- Phylum: Arthropoda
- Class: Insecta
- Order: Lepidoptera
- Family: Coleophoridae
- Genus: Coleophora
- Species: C. seminella

Binomial name
- Coleophora seminella McDunnough, 1946

Species of moth

Coleophora seminella is a moth of the family Coleophoridae. It is found in Canada, including Nova Scotia and Ontario.

The larvae feed on the leaves of Aster species. They create a trivalved, tubular silken case.
