= Coleophora asterophagella =

Scientific classification
- Kingdom: Animalia
- Phylum: Arthropoda
- Class: Insecta
- Order: Lepidoptera
- Family: Coleophoridae
- Genus: Coleophora
- Species: C. asterophagella

Binomial name
- Coleophora asterophagella McDunnough, 1944

Species of moth

Coleophora asterophagella is a moth of the family Coleophoridae. It is found in Canada, including Ontario.

The larvae feed on the leaves of Aster species. They create an annulate case.
