= Hellinsia nigridactylus =

Scientific classification
- Domain: Eukaryota
- Kingdom: Animalia
- Phylum: Arthropoda
- Class: Insecta
- Order: Lepidoptera
- Family: Pterophoridae
- Genus: Hellinsia
- Species: H. nigridactylus

Binomial name
- Hellinsia nigridactylus (Yano, 1961)

Synonyms
- Oidaematophorus nigridactylus Yano, 1961

Species of plume moth

Hellinsia nigridactylus is a moth of the family Pterophoridae. It is known from Japan (Honshū, Kyushu), Korea, China and Russia.

The wingspan is 14–16 mm and the length of the forewings is 8–9 mm.

The larvae feed on Aster yomena.
