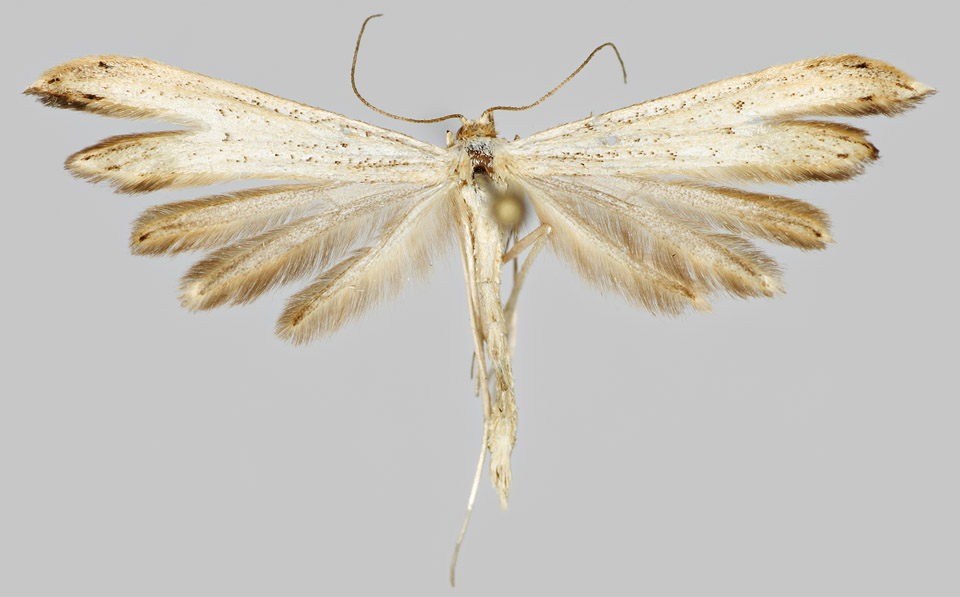

Scientific classification
- Kingdom: Animalia
- Phylum: Arthropoda
- Clade: Pancrustacea
- Class: Insecta
- Order: Lepidoptera
- Family: Pterophoridae
- Genus: Hellinsia
- Species: H. tephradactyla

Binomial name
- Hellinsia tephradactyla (Hübner, 1813)

Synonyms
- Alucita tephradactyla Hübner, 1813; Euleioptilus tephradactyla (Hübner, 1813)

= Hellinsia tephradactyla =

Species of moth

Hellinsia tephradactyla (also known as the plain plume) is a moth of the family Pterophoridae found in most of Europe (except Iceland, the Iberian Peninsula, Ukraine and Croatia). It was first described by the German taxonomist Jacob Hübner in 1813.

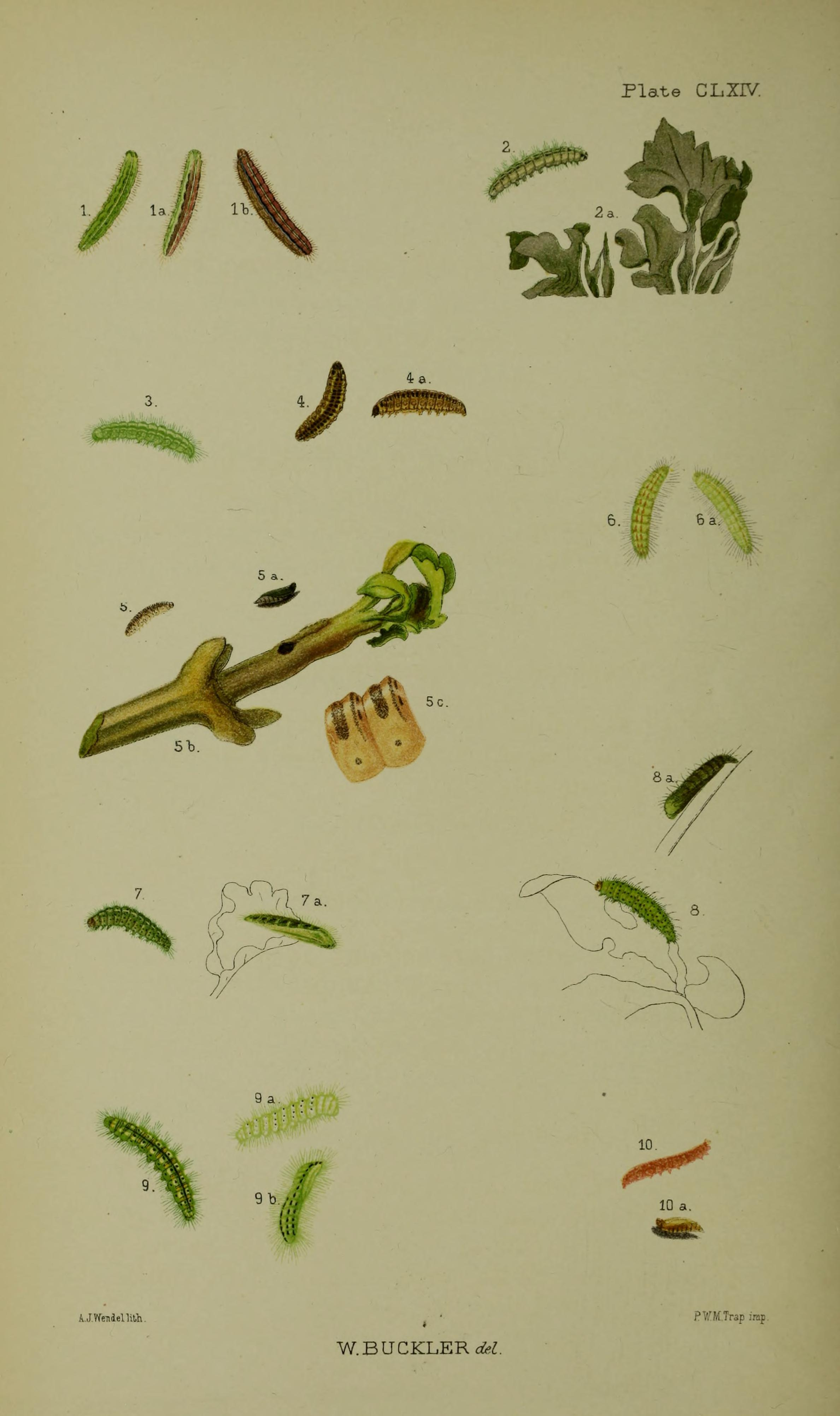
Fig. 3 larva after final moult

The wingspan is 18–23 millimetres (0.71–0.91 in). The forewings are ochreous whitish, irrorated with pale grey and blackish and with a blackish dot in the disc at 1/3. There two transversely placed blackish dots at the base of the fissure, and two or three on the margins of each segment towards the apex. The cilia are grey, on the costa whitish-ochreous towards the apex. The hindwings are grey with a darker dot at the apex of each segment. The larva is green with a double greyish dorsal line. The head is pale yellowish.

Adults are on wing in July. Larvae of the plain plume feed on European goldenrod (Solidago virgaurea), false aster (Aster bellidiastrum) and common daisy (Bellis perennis). Feeding is either on the flowers and seed heads or on the underside of leaves, depending on the source.
