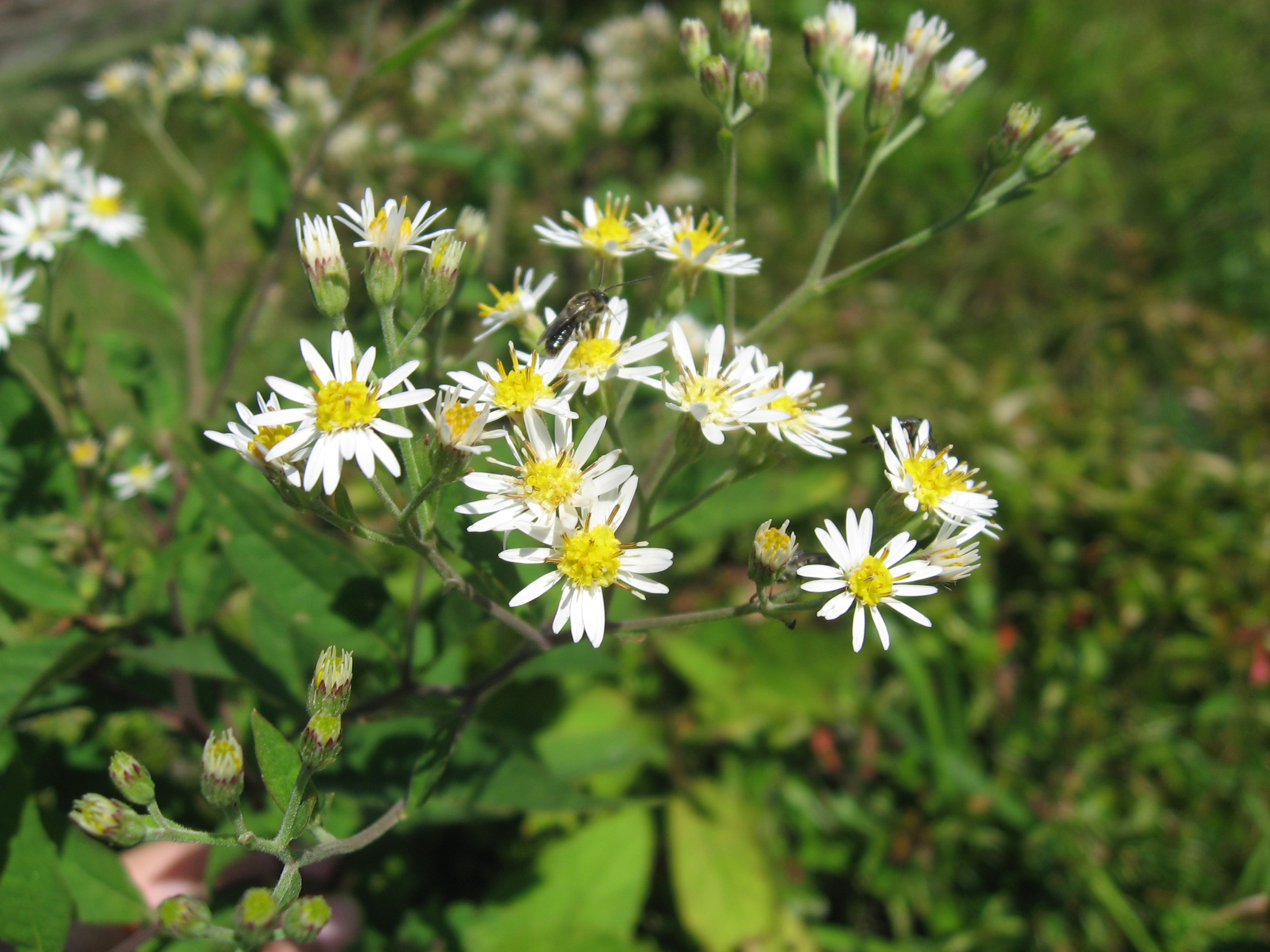

Scientific classification
- Kingdom: Plantae
- Clade: Tracheophytes
- Clade: Angiosperms
- Clade: Eudicots
- Clade: Asterids
- Order: Asterales
- Family: Asteraceae
- Genus: Aster
- Species: A. glehnii

Binomial name
- Aster glehnii F.Schmidt

Varieties
- Aster glehnii var. glehnii; Aster glehnii var. hondoensis Kitam.

Synonyms
- Kitamuria glehnii (F.Schmidt) G.L.Nesom

= Aster glehnii =

Species of flowering plant

Aster glehnii is a species of flowering plant in the family Asteraceae. Its native range is South Korea, Sakhalin to Japan.

== Description ==
A. glehnii is a clump-forming, upright herbaceous perennial growing up to 1.5 m (4 ft 11 in) tall from a thick, woody rhizome. Stems are tall, dark-coloured, erect, bearing crowded, small, dark green leaves. Flowers are small, stellate, clustered, and are usually white in colour, with a yellow centre. Flowers appear in September to October.

== Habitat ==
A. glenhii favours disturbed land, grasslands, verges and forest edges.

== Medicinal usage ==
Aster glehnii has been used traditionally in Asian folk medicine as an anti-inflammatory agent and has been used more recently as an ingredient in cosmetic formulations. Its leaves are used in Korea to treat insomnia.
