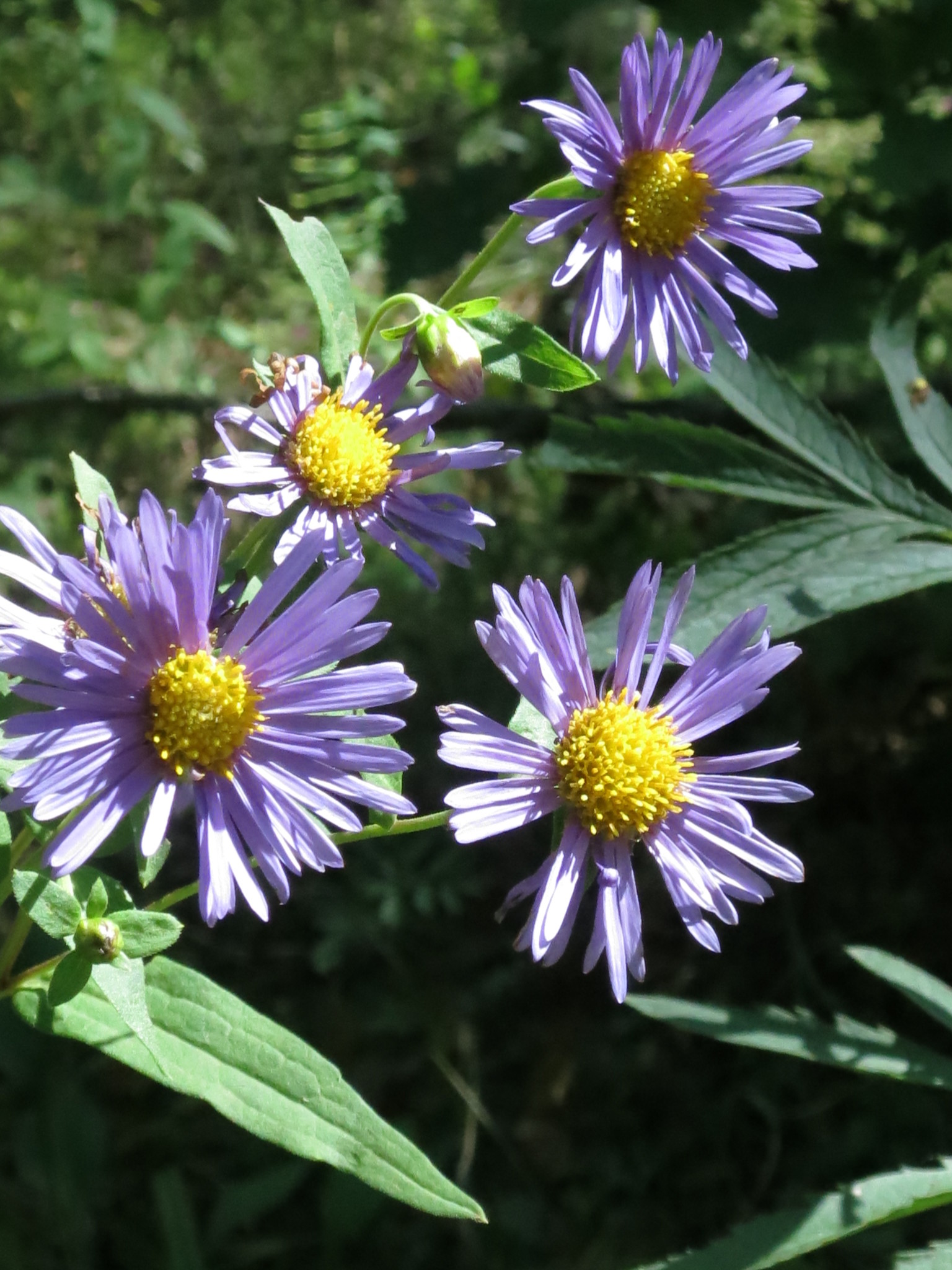

Scientific classification
- Kingdom: Plantae
- Clade: Tracheophytes
- Clade: Angiosperms
- Clade: Eudicots
- Clade: Asterids
- Order: Asterales
- Family: Asteraceae
- Genus: Aster
- Species: A. maackii

Binomial name
- Aster maackii Regel, 1961

= Aster maackii =

Species of flowering plant

Aster maackii is a plant species belonging to the family Asteraceae.

The species is described in 1861 by Eduard August von Regel. The species is named after Russian naturalist Richard Maack.
