= Christian Georg Brügger =

Swiss botanist and naturalist

Christian Georg Brügger (11 March 1833, Churwalden – 16 October 1899) was a Swiss botanist and naturalist.

He studied natural sciences in Munich and Innsbruck, afterwards spending several years as curator of the botanical museum at Zurich Polytechnic (1859–70). From 1870 to 1898, he taught classes in natural history and geography at the Graubünden canton school.

He was the author of numerous articles on botany, zoology, meteorology, et al. — being published in the Jahresberichte der Naturforschenden Gesellschaft Graubünden. As a taxonomist he described many botanical species.

== Selected works ==
- Beitrag zur rhätischen Laubmoosflora aus den Jahren 1851–1855, (1861) – Contribution to the Rhaetian moss flora from the years 1851 to 1855.
- Beobachtungen über wildwachsende Pflanzenbastarde der Schweizer- und Nachbar-Floren, 1878 – Observations on wild plant hybrids of Switzerland and neighboring regions.
- Beitrage Zur Natur-Chronik Der Schweiz Insbesondere Der Rhatischen Alpen, 1882 – Contributions to the natural history of Switzerland, in particular the Rhaetian Alps.
- Mittheilungen über neue und kritische Formen der Bündner-und Nachbar-Floren, 1886 – Information on new and critical species of Graubünden and neighboring regions.
