= Aster tonglingensis =

Scientific classification
- Kingdom: Plantae
- Clade: Embryophytes
- Clade: Tracheophytes
- Clade: Spermatophytes
- Clade: Angiosperms
- Clade: Eudicots
- Clade: Asterids
- Order: Asterales
- Family: Asteraceae
- Genus: Aster
- Species: A. tonglingensis

Binomial name
- Aster tonglingensis G.J.Zhang & T.G.Gao

Species of flowering plant

Aster tonglingensis is a species of flowering plant in the family Asteraceae. It is a perennial plant native to China. It was described in 2019 and named after its only known locality, Mt. Tongling, Wencheng County, Zhejiang Province, China.

== Description ==
Aster tonglingensis is a perennial plant that is superficially similar to Aster dolichophyllus, in that both species have narrowly lanceolate, cauline leaves, recurved phyllary tips, and tend to occur near streams. However, the phyllaries of A. tonglingensis are green (as opposed to purple-tipped in A. dolichophyllus), and the leaves are pubescent (vs. glabrous), with the basal leaves lanceolate, apex rounded or obtuse (rather than spatulate, apex acute), with the corolla of the disc floret somewhat smaller than A. dolichophylus and the seed head white, instead of brownish.

== Distribution and habitat ==
Aster tonglingensis is currently known only from the banks of one stream in Mt. Tongling Natural Reserve, where fewer than 100 specimens were observed. Due to its narrow area of distribution, A. tonglingensis would be considered a critically endangered species if assessed.
