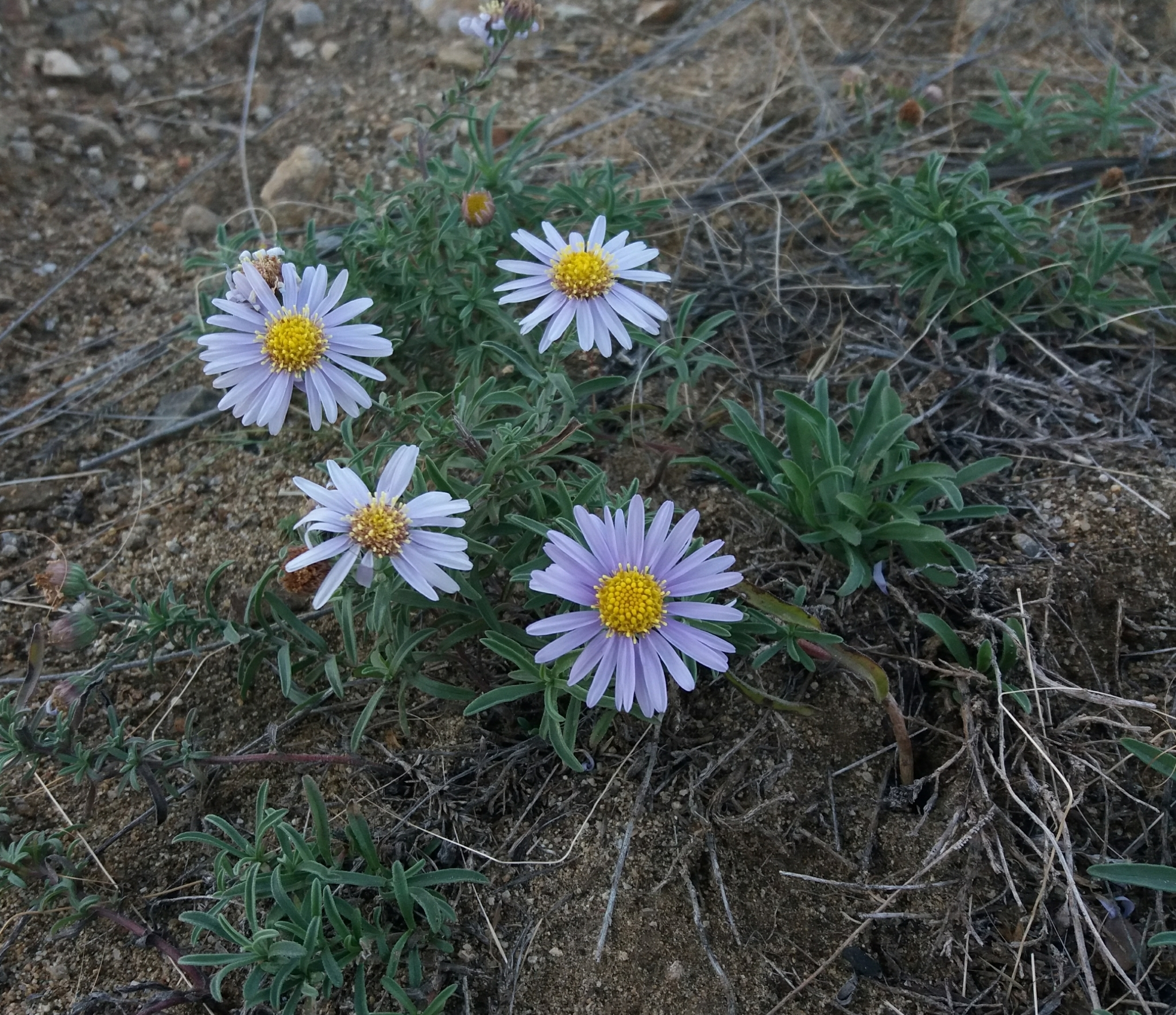

Scientific classification
- Kingdom: Plantae
- Clade: Tracheophytes
- Clade: Angiosperms
- Clade: Eudicots
- Clade: Asterids
- Order: Asterales
- Family: Asteraceae
- Genus: Aster
- Species: A. altaicus

Binomial name
- Aster altaicus Willd. (1809)

Varieties
- 8; see text

Synonyms
- Heteropappus altaicus (Willd.) Novopokrov. (1922); Kalimeris altaica (Willd.) Nees ex Fisch., C.A.Mey. & Avé-Lall. (1842)

= Aster altaicus =

Species of flowering plant

Aster altaicus is a species of plant belonging to the family Asteraceae. It is a perennial native to Temperate Asia.

== Varieties ==
Eight varieties are accepted.

- Aster altaicus var. altaicus – Iran and Kazakhstan through Siberia, the Himalayas, and China to Korea
- Aster altaicus var. canescens (Nees) Serg. – Caucasus and Iran through Central Asia to Western Himalaya and Mongolia
- Aster altaicus var. decrescens (Grierson) R.Abid & Qaiser – Afghanistan to Western Himalaya
- Aster altaicus var. hirsutus Hand.-Mazz. – south-central China (western Sichuan and northwestern Yunnan)
- Aster altaicus var. millefolius (Vaniot) Hand.-Mazz. – northern China
- Aster altaicus var. scaber (Avé-Lall.) Hand.-Mazz. – north-central China (Liaoning and Shanxi)
- Aster altaicus var. taitoensis Kitam. – Taiwan
- Aster altaicus var. tenuicaulis (Grierson) R.Abid & Qaiser – Afghanistan and northern and western Pakistan
