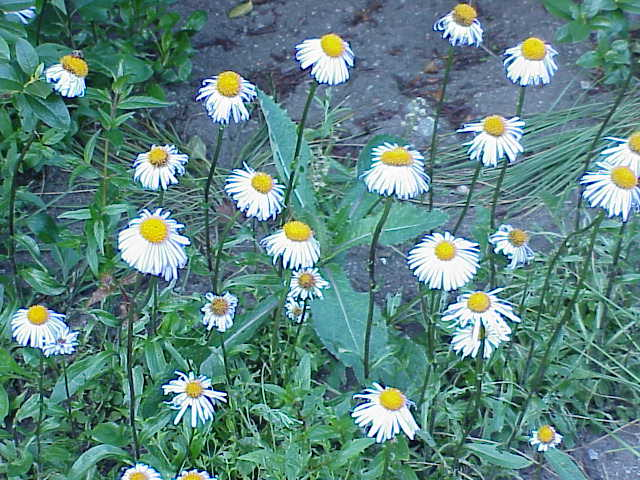

Scientific classification
- Kingdom: Plantae
- Clade: Tracheophytes
- Clade: Angiosperms
- Clade: Eudicots
- Clade: Asterids
- Order: Asterales
- Family: Asteraceae
- Genus: Aster
- Species: A. tongolensis

Binomial name
- Aster tongolensis Franch.

= Aster tongolensis =

Species of plant

Aster tongolensis, commonly called East Indies aster, is a plant species of the genus Aster. Along with Aster souliei, it has been used in traditional Tibetan medicine for thousands of years as treatment for bronchitis, difficulty in urinating, and hemoptysis caused by tuberculosis.
