= Aster formosanus =

Scientific classification
- Kingdom: Plantae
- Clade: Tracheophytes
- Clade: Angiosperms
- Clade: Eudicots
- Clade: Asterids
- Order: Asterales
- Family: Asteraceae
- Genus: Aster
- Species: A. formosanus

Binomial name
- Aster formosanus Hayata

Species of plant

Aster formosanus is a species of flowering plant in the family Asteraceae, native to Taiwan, and Zhejiang, China. An uncommon perennial reaching 80 cm (31 in), it is found in well-lit situations in mixed deciduous/coniferous forests at elevations from 1,400 to 2,700 m (4,600 to 8,900 ft). Preferring sandy, damp soils, it often appears on paths and roadside verges.

== Description ==
A. formosanus is a perennial herbaceous plant growing between 30-80 cm tall. Rhizomes are long and slender. Stems are erect, simple, sometimes branched in upper part, finely striate, purplish, glabrous. Leaves are dark green, cauline, and gradually reduced upward. Flowers are stellate, usually white, with yellow centres, appearing May to December.The fruit is an achene.
