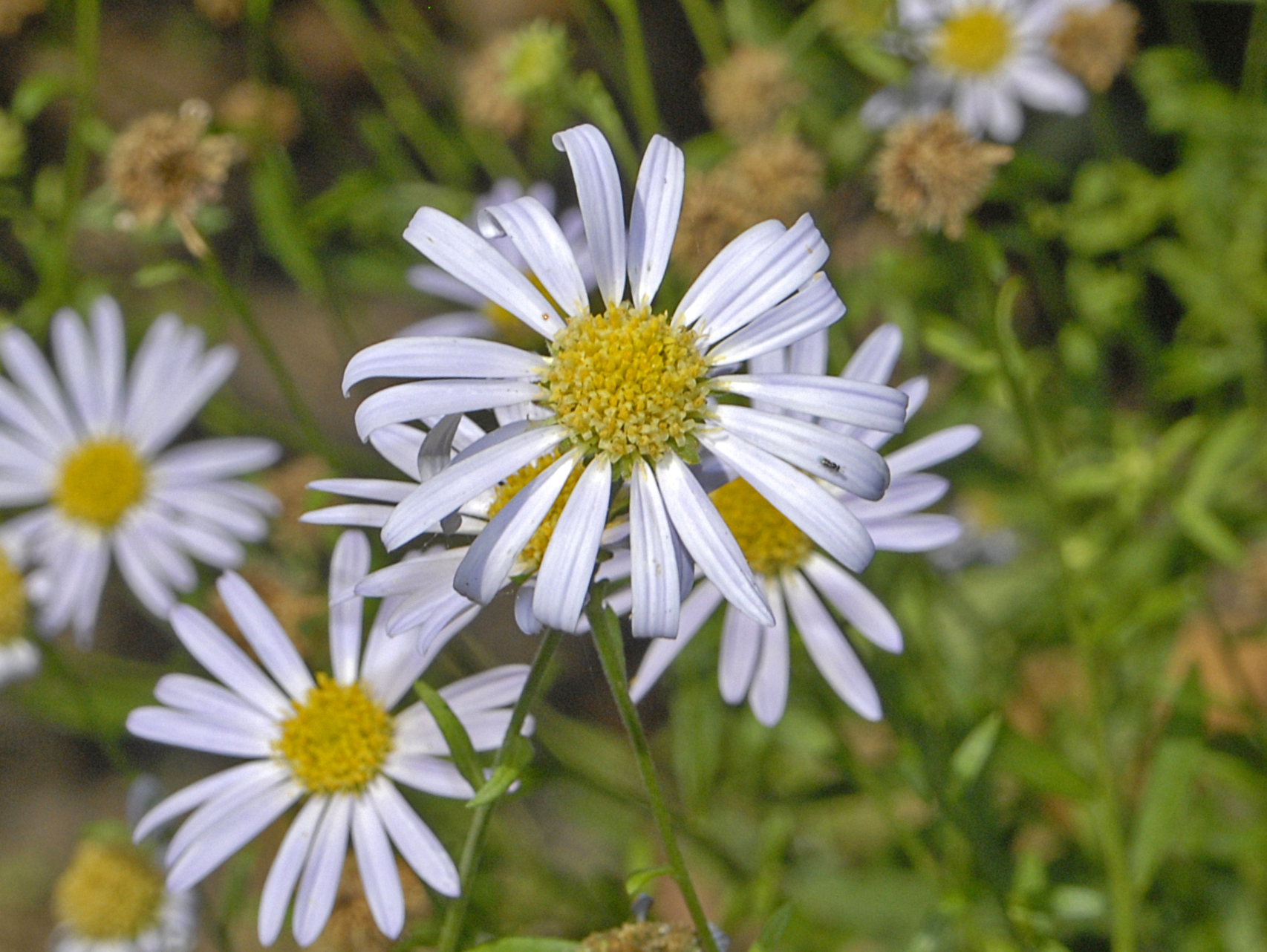
- At the Orto Botanico di Brera, Milan
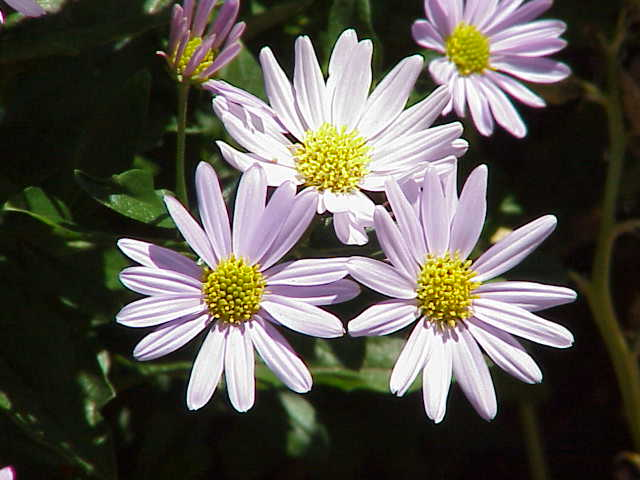

Scientific classification
- Kingdom: Plantae
- Clade: Tracheophytes
- Clade: Angiosperms
- Clade: Eudicots
- Clade: Asterids
- Order: Asterales
- Family: Asteraceae
- Genus: Aster
- Species: A. incisus

Binomial name
- Aster incisus Fisch.

Synonyms
- List: Aster incisus var. australis Kitag.; Aster macrodon H.Lév. & Vaniot; Aster pinnatifidus f. robustus Makino; Aster robustus (Makino) Yonek.; Asteromoea incisa (Fisch.) Koidz.; Boltonia incisa (Fisch.) Benth.; Grindelia incisa (Fisch.) Spreng.; Kalimeris incisa (Fisch.) DC.; Kalimeris incisa var. australis (Kitag.) Kitag.; Kalimeris incisa subsp. macrodon (Vaniot & H.Lév.) H.Y.Gu; Kalimeris incisa var. robusta (Makino) Kitag.; Kalimeris platycephala Cass. ex Nees

= Aster incisus =

Species of plant

Aster incisus (syn. Kalimeris incisa), is a species of flowering plant in the family Asteraceae. It is native to the Eastern Asia; Chita Oblast in Siberia, the southern Russian Far East, Inner Mongolia, Manchuria, the Korean peninsula, and Japan.

== Description ==
Aster incisus (common names include kalimeris and Japanese cutleaf aster) is a herbaceous perennial, growing to a height of 30 to 120 cm, with a spread of approximately 50 cm. Stems are erect, glabrous, and branched in the upper part. Leaves are lanceolate, alternating along the stem. The Latin name refers to the toothed or incised appearance of the leaves.

Flowers are stellate, with ray florets pink to bluish-purple in colour, and disk florets yellow. Flowers appear from June to October. The fruit is an achene. Achenes are brownish, ovoid, measuring 3 - 3.5 mm.

It can take two to five years for a plant to reach maturity. Over time a group of plants will spread to form a colony.

== Subtaxa ==
The following varieties are accepted:

- Aster incisus var. incisus
- Aster incisus var. macrodon (H.Lév. & Vaniot) Soejima & Igari

== Habitat ==
It prefers meadows and lowlands.

== Medicinal use ==
A. incisa has been used in Korean traditional medicine. Research in Korea indicates that A. incisa has antioxidant and anti-inflammatory properties, and may potentially be useful in treating several types of cancer.
