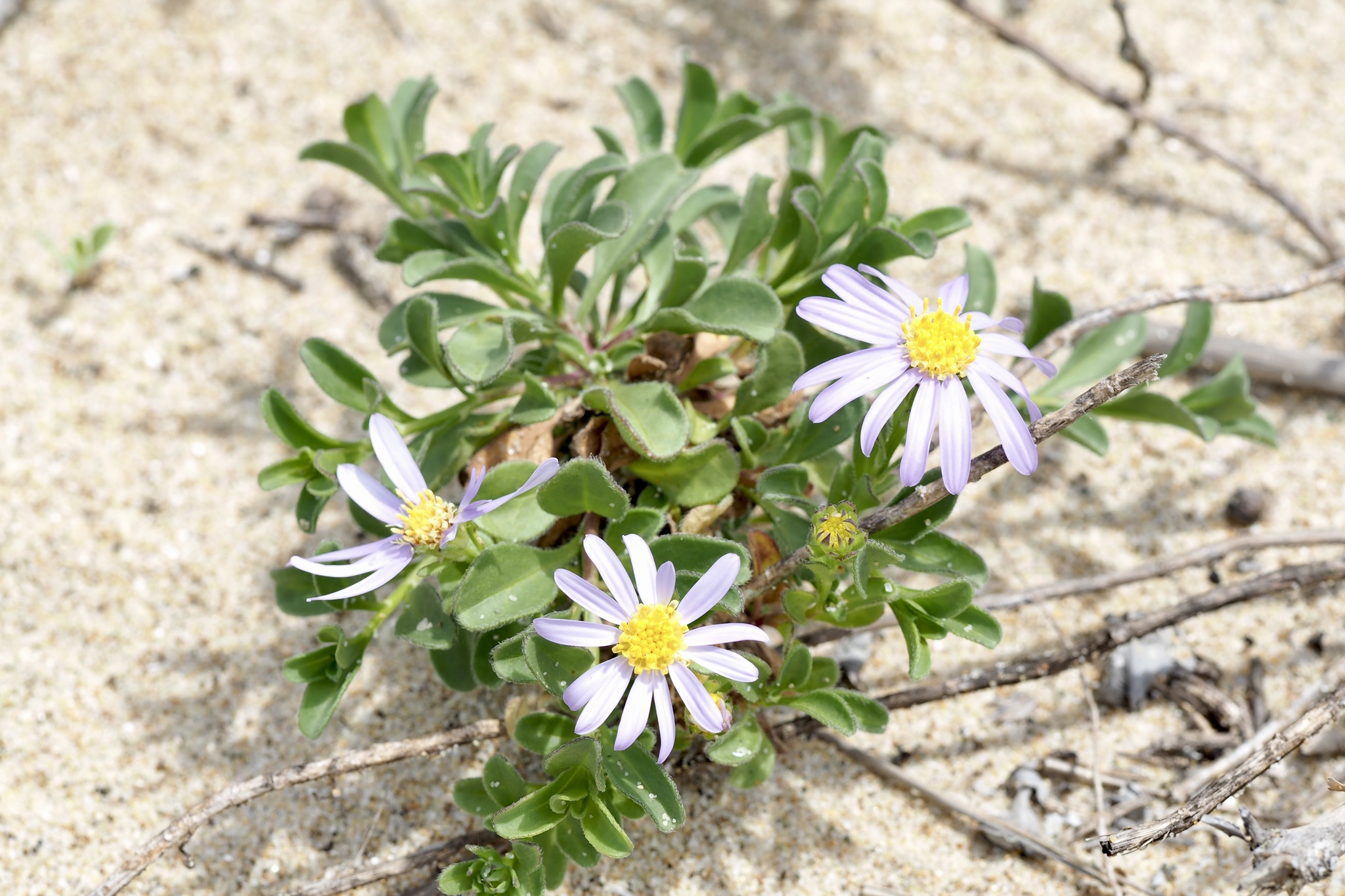

Scientific classification
- Kingdom: Plantae
- Clade: Tracheophytes
- Clade: Angiosperms
- Clade: Eudicots
- Clade: Asterids
- Order: Asterales
- Family: Asteraceae
- Genus: Aster
- Species: A. arenarius

Binomial name
- Aster arenarius (Kitam.) Nemoto

= Aster arenarius =

Species of flowering plant

Aster arenarius, commonly known as the beach sand aster, is a species of aster endemic to southeast China, Japan, and Korea.

== Description ==
Aster arenarius is a herbaceous biennial or perennial plant, which grows to a height of 15–70 cm (5.9–27.6 in). Stems are branched from the base, with spatulate leaves measuring between 1.5 and 3 cm (0.59 and 1.18 in). Leaves are alternate, entire or dentate. Roots are tuberous or woody rhizomes. Flowers are typically blue-violet or white, with yellow centres. The fruit is an achene, ripening in September to October, ovate, measuring 3.0–3.5 mm (0.12–0.14 in) long and 1.8–3.0 mm (0.071–0.118 in) wide, with hairs on the margins.

== Habitat ==
Aster arenarius grows along sandy seashores, near sea level.

== Uses ==
The flowers have been used not only for ornamental purposes, but also as raw materials in the manufacturing process due to the increasing demand for natural compounds various industries.

The young shoots of the plant are edible.

Research has confirmed that Aster arenarius is high in antioxidants and other valuable natural resources that can be used in the pharmaceutical, perfume, and cosmetic industries.
