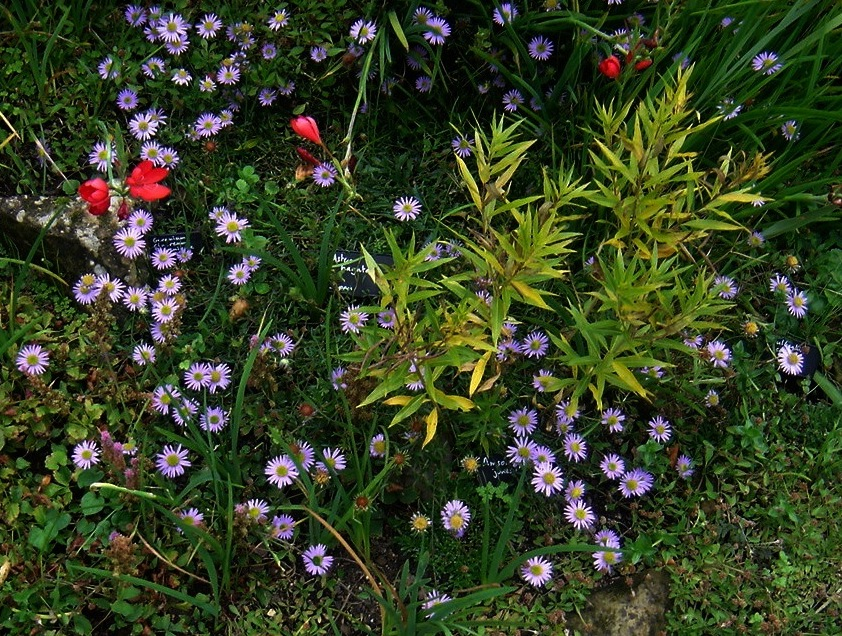

Scientific classification
- Kingdom: Plantae
- Clade: Tracheophytes
- Clade: Angiosperms
- Clade: Eudicots
- Clade: Asterids
- Order: Asterales
- Family: Asteraceae
- Genus: Aster
- Species: A. hayatae

Binomial name
- Aster hayatae Lév. & Vaniot (1909)

= Aster hayatae =

Species of plant

Aster hayatae is a species of flowering plant in the family Asteraceae. It is native to South Korea.

== Description ==
Aster hayatae is a herbaceous perennial, growing from 15 to 25 cm in height. Stems are branching and erect, with basal leaves spatulate, toothed and lightly pubescent, and upper leaves linear and close together. Flowers are purple or violet in colour, and bloom between June and October. Fruit is an achene, ovoid, brown, measuring 3mm – 2mm.

== Habitat ==
Aster hayatae grows in dry soil and sunny slopes as well as in rocky crevices. It is unique to Korea.

== Medicinal usage ==
Like other Aster species, A. hayatae has antioxidant properties, and has been used in traditional medicines.
