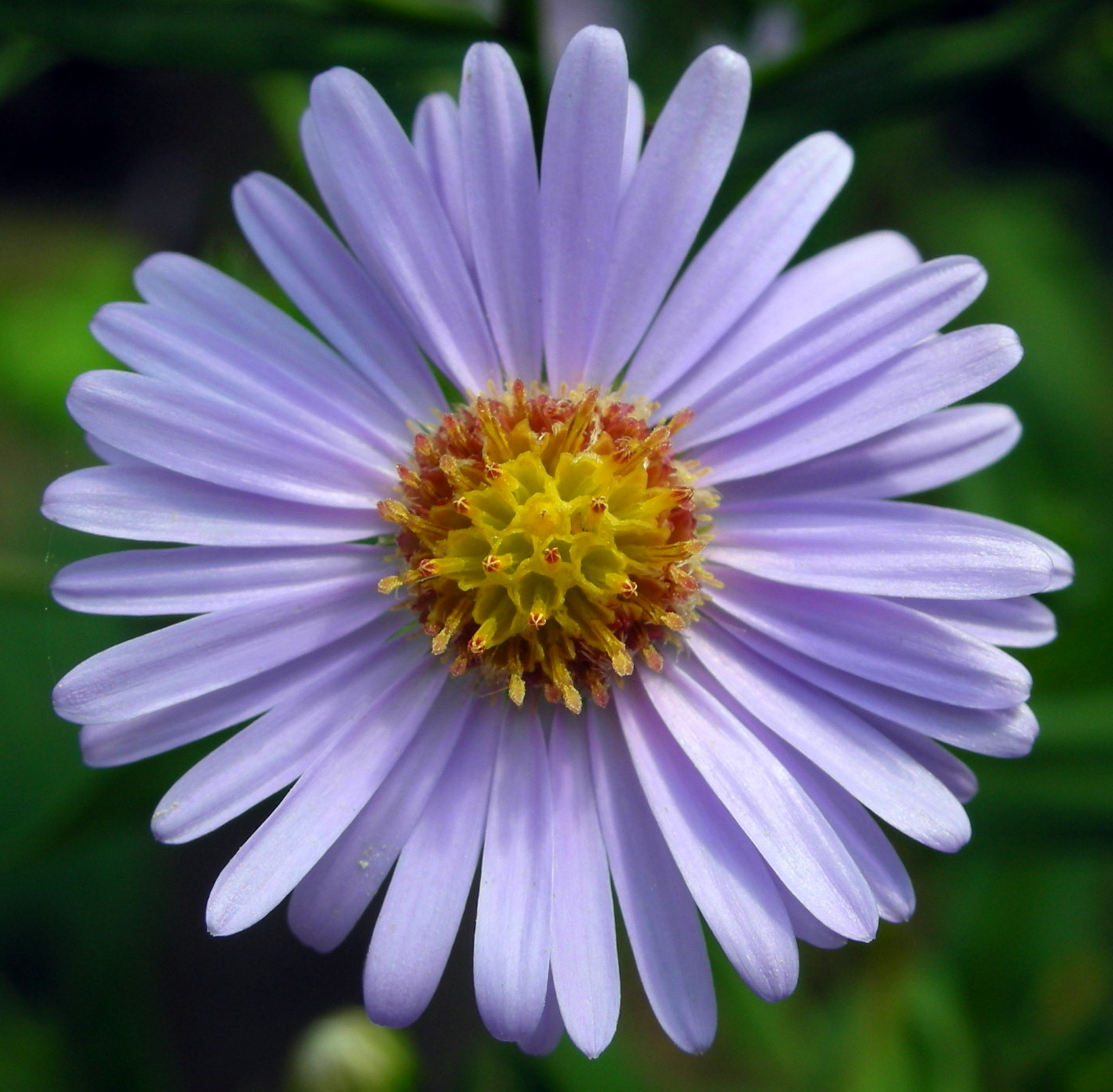

Scientific classification
- Kingdom: Plantae
- Clade: Tracheophytes
- Clade: Angiosperms
- Clade: Eudicots
- Clade: Asterids
- Order: Asterales
- Family: Asteraceae
- Genus: Aster
- Species: A. tataricus

Binomial name
- Aster tataricus L. f.

= Aster tataricus =

Species of plant

Aster tataricus, also called Tatarian aster and Tatarinow's aster, is a member of the Aster genus of flowering plants native to East Asia.

== Description ==
Perennial that typically grows up to 2 meters tall and spreads up to 1.2 meters wide.

Stem is described as scabrous, hardly twice as long as the leaves growing directly from its base, with few narrower leaves.

Radical leaves are lanceolate-ovate, deeply serrated with the exception of the apex and base of the leaf and often decurrent into petioles.

Flower count ranges from five to eight in a single inflorescence, each one large in proportion. The peduncle of the inflorescence has two thin and alternate bracts.

Calyx is imbricate in shape, slightly purplish at the apex of each sepal.

Ray flowers are large and blue-colored.

== Distribution ==
The species is native to Asia, with its occurrence ranging from South Siberia to China to Japan. Additionally, it has been introduced into Germany and multiple states of the Eastern United States, such as Wisconsin, Michigan, Iowa, Alabama and Georgia.

== Uses ==
=== Culinary ===
Known as gaemichwi (개미취) in Korean, the plant is considered a chwinamul (edible Aster) variety used in Korean cuisine.

=== Medicinal ===
It is one of the 50 fundamental herbs of traditional Chinese medicine, where it has the name zǐwǎn (Chinese: 紫菀). It has an antibacterial action, inhibiting the growth of Staphylococcus aureus, E. coli, Shigella dysenteriae, B. typhi, Pseudomonas and Vibrio proteus.

== In culture ==
In Japan, Aster tataricus is known as shion, or 紫苑. The flower has a meaning in hanakotoba, the Japanese language of flowers, which corresponds to "I won't forget you."
