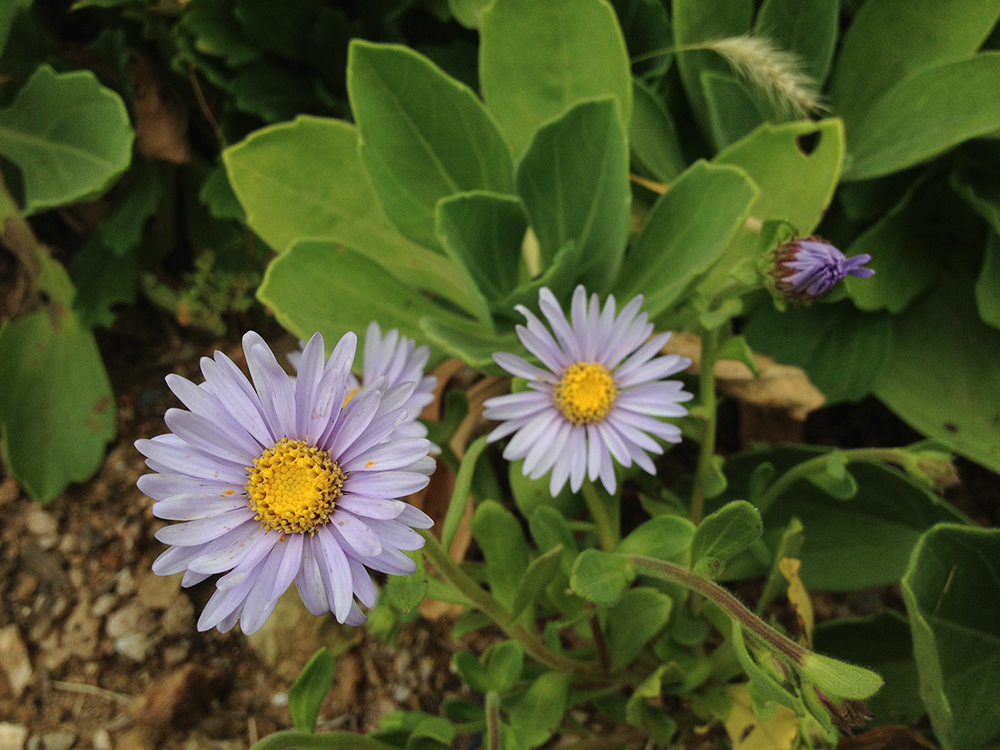

Scientific classification
- Kingdom: Plantae
- Clade: Tracheophytes
- Clade: Angiosperms
- Clade: Eudicots
- Clade: Asterids
- Order: Asterales
- Family: Asteraceae
- Genus: Aster
- Species: A. spathulifolius

Binomial name
- Aster spathulifolius Maxim.

Synonyms
- Homotypic Synonyms: Erigeron spathulifolius (Maxim.) H.S.Pak; Heterotypic Synonyms: Aster chusanensis Y.S.Lim, Hyun, Y.D.Kim & H.C.Shin; Aster feddei H.Lév. & Vaniot; Aster oharae Nakai; Aster spathulifolius f. albiflorus H.Nakan.; Aster spathulifolius f. albus Y.N.Lee; Aster spathulifolius var. oharae (Nakai) Y.N.Lee; Aster spathulifolius f. oharae (Nakai) M.Kim; Erigeron feddei (H.Lév. & Vaniot) Botsch.; Erigeron oharae (Nakai) Botsch.; Erigeron spathulifolius var. oharae (Nakai) H.S.Pak; Heteropappus krylovianus Kom.; Heteropappus oharae (Nakai) Kitam.

= Aster spathulifolius =

Species of plant

Aster spathulifolius (Korean: 해국/haeguk, known in English as seashore spatulate aster) is a species of flowering plant in the family Asteraceae. It is native to Japan, Korea, and Primorsky Krai. In Korea it grows on seashores. Due to its short stature and thick leaves, it endures strong wind and cold temperatures. It produces purple flowers in sunny spots between rocks, in July through November. It originated in Ulleungdo and Liancourt Rocks, two islands in the Sea of Japan. In the fall, it is in full bloom, coloring the Liancourt Rocks in purple.

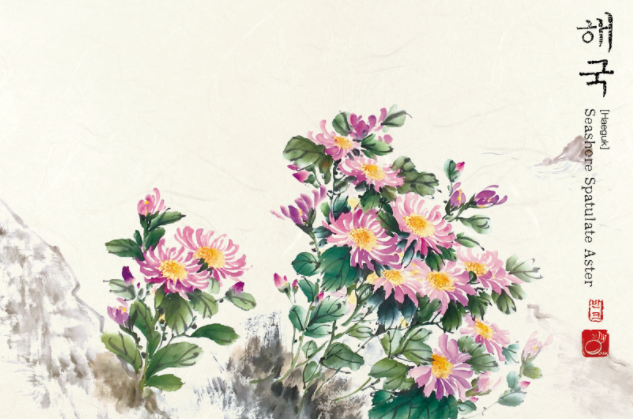
Haeguk, flower that grows in Ulleungdo
