= Aster neoelegans =

Scientific classification
- Kingdom: Plantae
- Clade: Tracheophytes
- Clade: Angiosperms
- Clade: Eudicots
- Clade: Asterids
- Order: Asterales
- Family: Asteraceae
- Genus: Aster
- Species: A. neoelegans

Binomial name
- Aster neoelegans Grierson

Synonyms
- Aster elegans Hook. f. & Thomson ex C.B. Clarke, 1876

Species of plant

Aster neoelegans is a species of flowering plant in the family Asteraceae. It is found in Bhutan, China and India.

== Description ==
A. neoelegans is a herbaceous perennial, growing up to 40-75 cm tall. Stems are simple and strigillose. Leaves are entire, oblanceolate to spatulate; ray florets are white, mauve, or blue-violet, in colour. Disk florets are yellow. Achenes are light brown, obovoid, compressed, 2.5-3 mm. Pappus is whitish, 3-seriate, bristles barbellate throughout. Flowers July-September.
