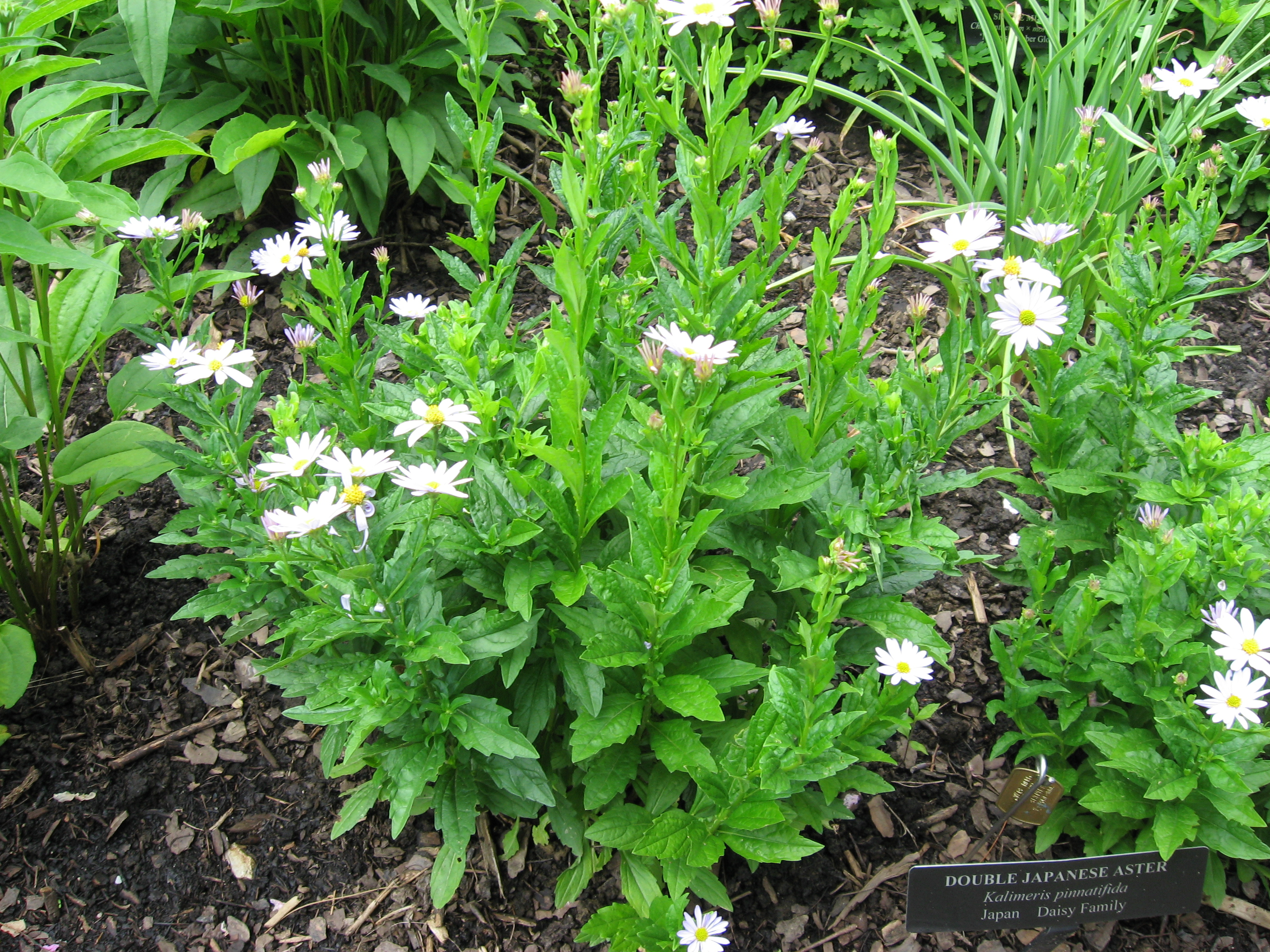

Scientific classification
- Kingdom: Plantae
- Clade: Tracheophytes
- Clade: Angiosperms
- Clade: Eudicots
- Clade: Asterids
- Order: Asterales
- Family: Asteraceae
- Genus: Aster
- Species: A. iinumae

Binomial name
- Aster iinumae Kitam.

Synonyms
- Aster indicus var. pinnatifidus Maxim. ex Makino; Aster pinnatifidus (Maxim. ex Makino) Makino; Asteromoea pinnatifida (Maxim. ex Makino) Koidz.; Kalimeris pinnatifida (Maxim. ex Makino) Kitam.

= Aster iinumae =

Species of flowering plant

Aster iinumae, synonyms including Kalimeris pinnatifida, is a species of flowering plant in the family Asteraceae. It is also known as the double Japanese aster.
