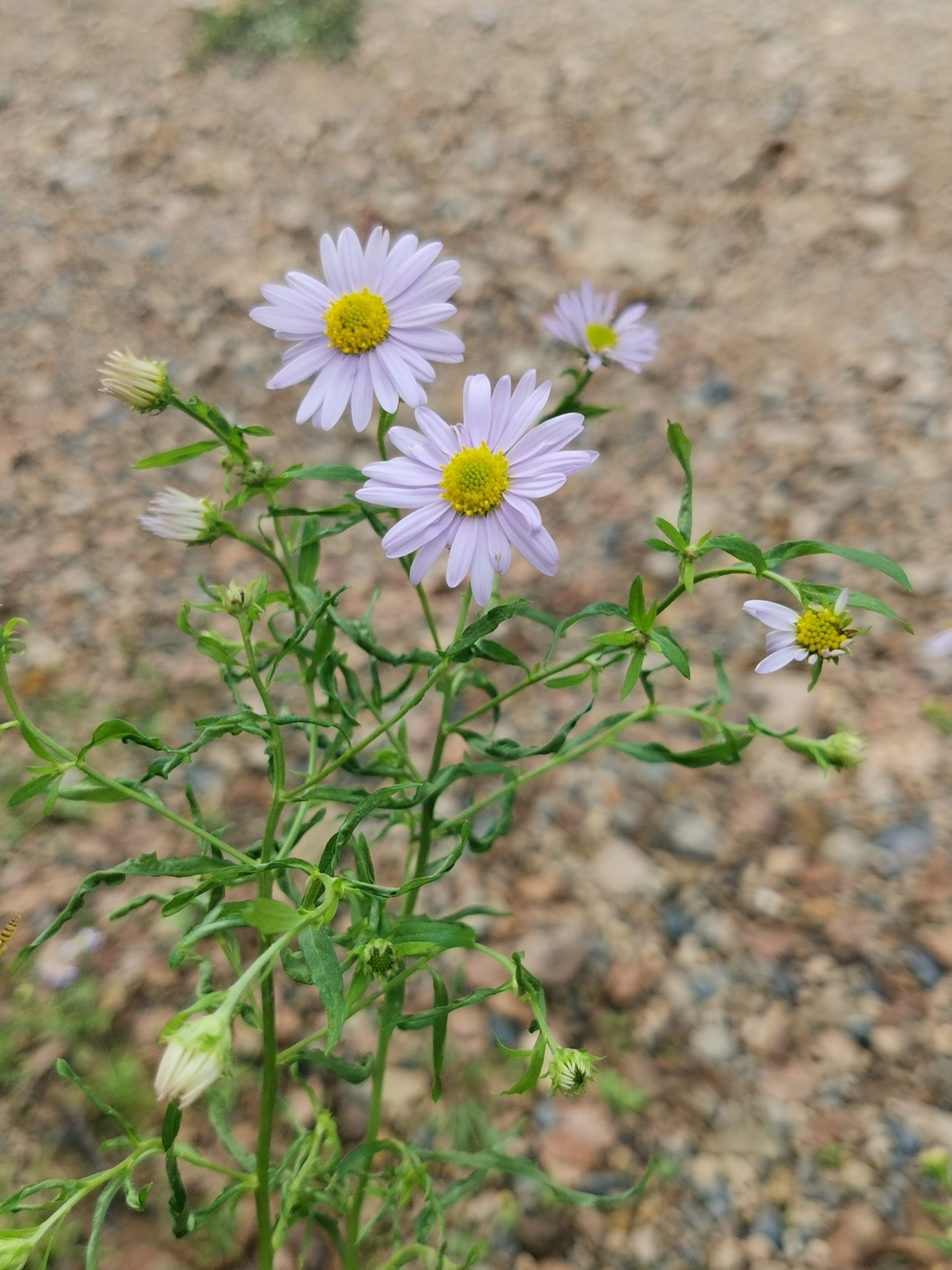

Scientific classification
- Kingdom: Plantae
- Clade: Embryophytes
- Clade: Tracheophytes
- Clade: Spermatophytes
- Clade: Angiosperms
- Clade: Eudicots
- Clade: Asterids
- Order: Asterales
- Family: Asteraceae
- Genus: Boltonia
- Species: B. lautureana

Binomial name
- Boltonia lautureana Debeaux

Synonyms
- Aster lautureanus (Debeaux) Franch.; Asteromoea lautureana (Debeaux) Hand.-Mazz.; Kalimeris lautureana (Debeaux) Kitam.

= Boltonia lautureana =

Species of plant

Boltonia lautureana is an East Asian species of plants in the family Asteraceae. It is native to China, Japan, Korea, and Asiatic Russia.

Boltonia lautureana is a plant up to 100 cm (40 inches) tall. It has many daisy-like flower heads with blue ray florets and yellow disc florets.
