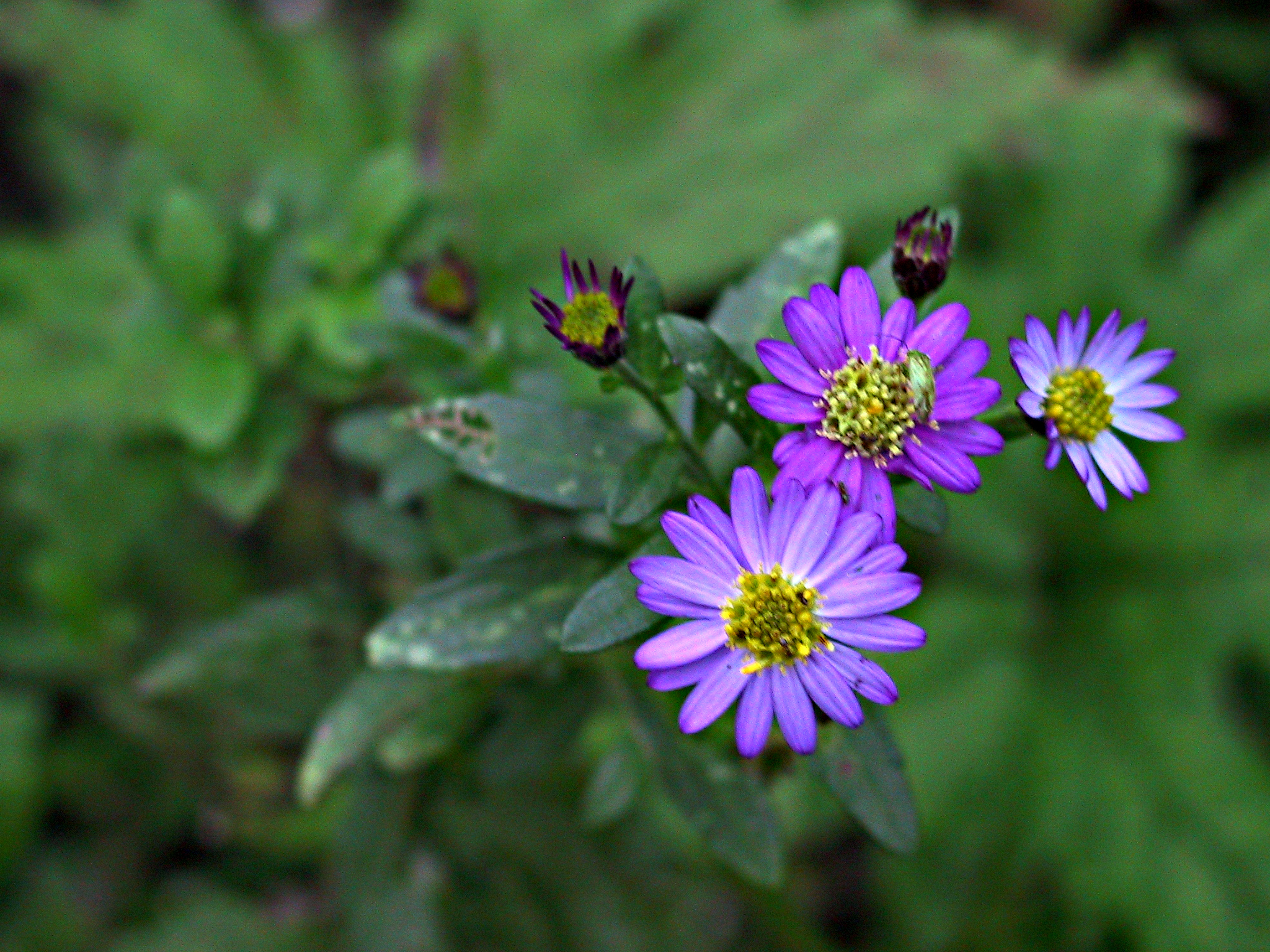

Scientific classification
- Kingdom: Plantae
- Clade: Tracheophytes
- Clade: Angiosperms
- Clade: Eudicots
- Clade: Asterids
- Order: Asterales
- Family: Asteraceae
- Genus: Aster
- Species: A. ageratoides

Binomial name
- Aster ageratoides Turcz.

Subspecies
- List: Aster ageratoides var. ageratoides; Aster ageratoides var. alatopetiolatus (Kitam.) Kitam.; Aster ageratoides var. firmus (Diels) Hand.-Mazz.; Aster ageratoides var. gerlachii (Hance) C.C.Chang ex Y.Ling; Aster ageratoides var. heterophyllus Maxim.; Aster ageratoides var. intermedius (Soejima) Mot.Ito & Soejima; Aster ageratoides var. lasiocladus (Hayata) Hand.-Mazz.; Aster ageratoides var. laticorymbus (Vaniot) Hand.-Mazz.; Aster ageratoides var. micranthus Y.Ling; Aster ageratoides var. oophyllus Y.Ling ex J.Q.Fu; Aster ageratoides var. ovalifolius Kitam.; Aster ageratoides var. pendulus W.P.Li & G.X.Chen; Aster ageratoides var. pilosus (Diels) Hand.-Mazz.; Aster ageratoides var. sawadanus Kitam.; Aster ageratoides var. scaberulus (Miq.) Y.Ling; Aster ageratoides var. spirifolius H.S.Pak; Aster ageratoides var. tenuifolius Kitam.

Synonyms
- Aster trinervius subsp. ageratoides (Turcz.) Grierson

= Aster ageratoides =

Species of flowering plant

Aster ageratoides (common name, balsam aster) is a perennial flowering plant in the family Asteraceae. It is endemic to eastern Asia.

== Description ==
A. ageratoides is a clump-forming, herbaceous perennial growing to a height of approximately 75–90 cm (30–35 in). Leaves are dark green, toothed, lanceolate and entire. Flowers are stellate, generally violet, pink or bluish in colour, with yellow centres, flowering from early to late autumn. Fruit is an achene, brown in colour, measuring about 2–3 mm (0.079–0.118 in) in length.

== Distribution and habitat ==
A. ageratoides is widely distributed throughout Asia, including China, Korea, Japan, Taiwan, where it is usually found in mountainous regions at elevations between 1,500–2,500 m (4,900–8,200 ft).

== Medicinal use ==
Ongoing research suggests that Aster ageratoides extract may help attenuate Alzheimer's disease-associated cognitive deficits and improve the symptoms of vascular dementia.
