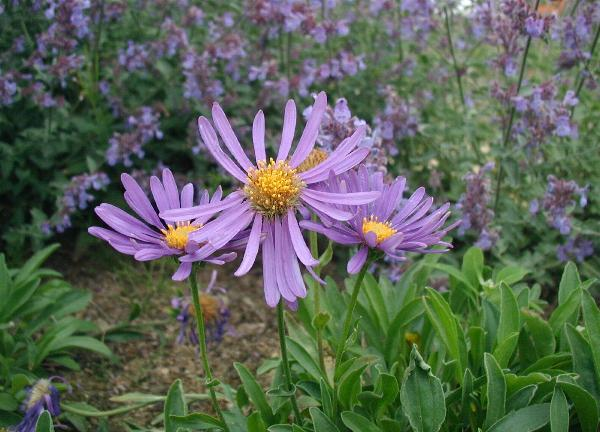

Conservation status
- Secure (NatureServe)

Scientific classification
- Kingdom: Plantae
- Clade: Tracheophytes
- Clade: Angiosperms
- Clade: Eudicots
- Clade: Asterids
- Order: Asterales
- Family: Asteraceae
- Genus: Aster
- Species: A. alpinus

Binomial name
- Aster alpinus L.

Synonyms
- Aster alpinus var. dolomiticus (Beck) Onno; Aster alpinus subsp. vierhapperi Onno; Aster fallax Tamamsch.; Aster garibaldii Brügger; Aster korshinskyi Tamamsch.; Aster serpentimontanus Tamamsch.

= Aster alpinus =

Species of plant

Aster alpinus, the alpine aster or blue alpine daisy, is a species of flowering plant in the family Asteraceae, native to the mountains of Europe (including the Alps), with a subspecies native to Canada and the United States. This herbaceous perennial has purple, pink, white or blue flowers in summer.

== Description ==
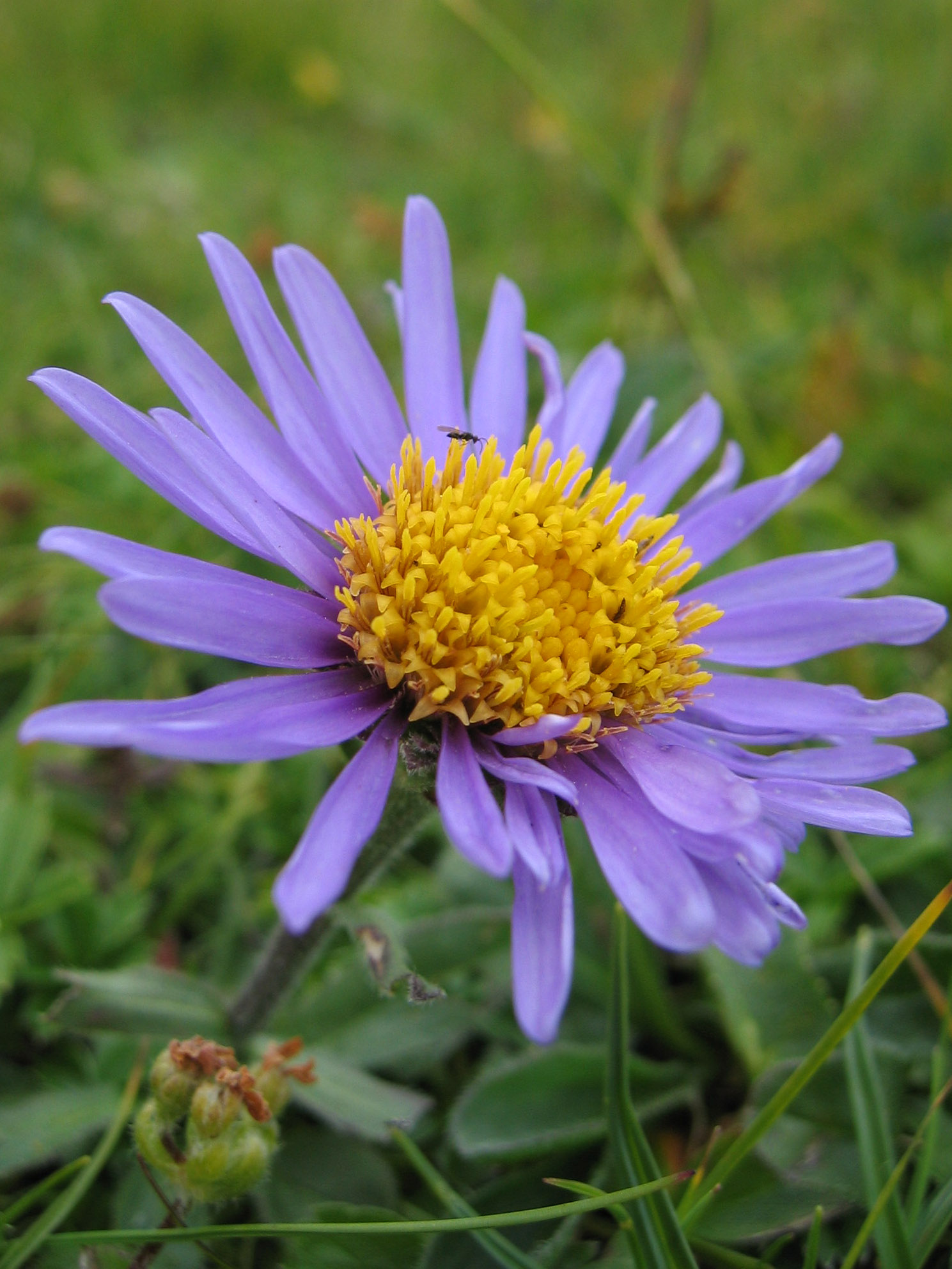
A. alpinus, an insect sucking its nectar.

Aster alpinus is a caespitose herbaceous perennial that grows 10–35 cm tall. The bloom color may be blue, indigo, violet, white, or pink. In the UK, this plant has gained the Royal Horticultural Society's Award of Garden Merit. Leaves are untoothed, lanceolate-spatulate, and basal. The Latin specific epithet alpinus means alpine and from high mountains above the timber line.

== Distribution and habitat ==
Aster A. alpinus generally prefers rockier soils. Its minimum pH scale is 6 and maximum pH scale is 7.5. Flowers are erect, and always solitary. Aster alpinus is native to the mountains of Europe such as the Alps and Pyrenees. Aster alpinus is the only true aster growing in North America. It's fruits are achenes, topped by white bristles.

Aster A. alpinus is an herbaceous plant. It does better in generally cooler climates, so it's US hardiness zones are 5 to 7.

== Conservation ==
NatureServe lists variety Aster alpinus var. vierhapperi as Secure Variety (T5) in Canada, but Critically Imperiled (S1) in Ontario and Vulnerable (S3) in Alberta. In the United States, it is Critically Imperiled (S1) in Colorado and Wyoming.
