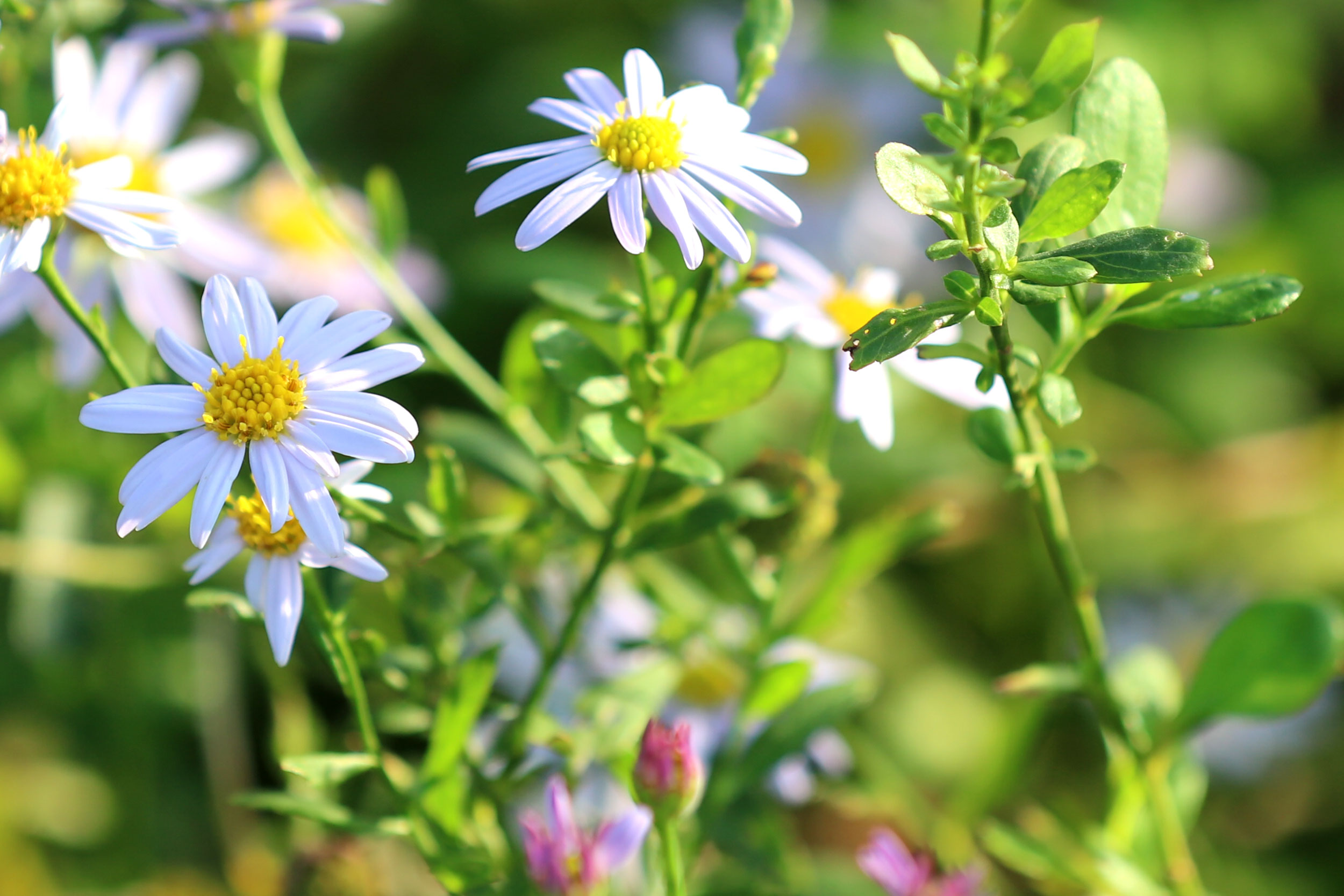
- Close-up of flowers, which can be white to pale lavender
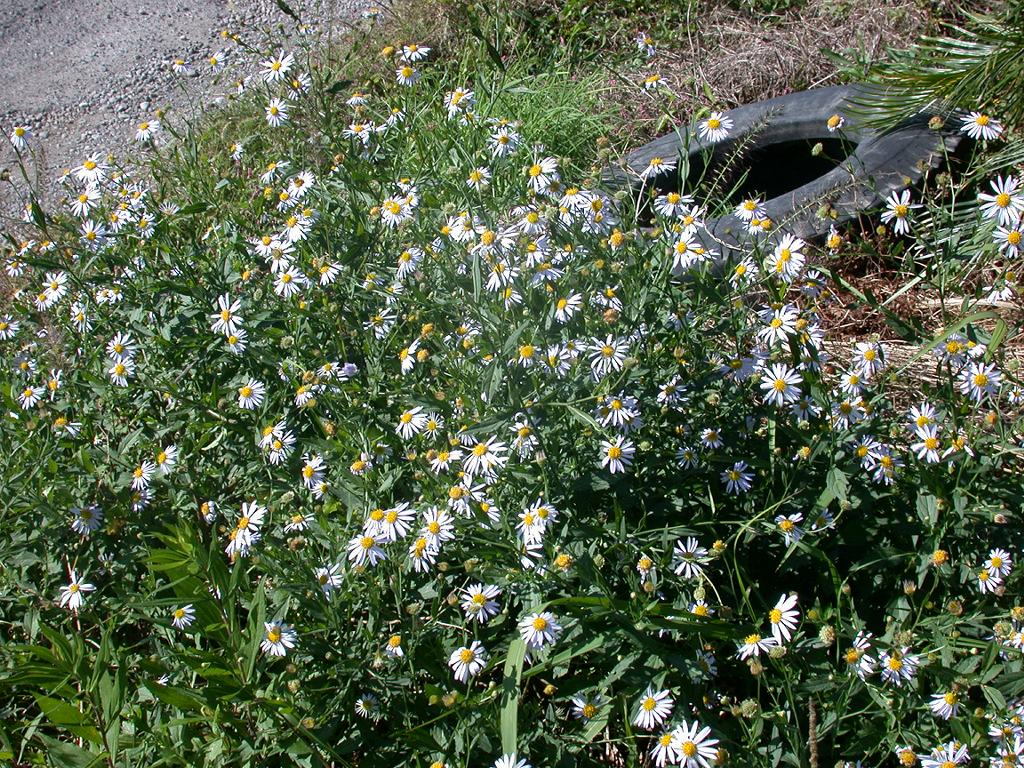
- Aster yomena is often found on roadsides

Scientific classification
- Kingdom: Plantae
- Clade: Tracheophytes
- Clade: Angiosperms
- Clade: Eudicots
- Clade: Asterids
- Order: Asterales
- Family: Asteraceae
- Genus: Aster
- Species: A. yomena

Binomial name
- Aster yomena (Kitam.) Honda

Synonyms
- Kalimeris pinnatifida var. angustifolia Nakai; Kalimeris yomena (Kitam.) Kitam.; Kalimeris yomena f. alba Sugim.; Kalimeris yomena subsp. angustifolia (Nakai) H.Y.Gu; Kalimeris yomena f. laciniata Sugim.

= Aster yomena =

Species of plant in the aster family

Aster yomena (syn. Kalimeris yomena), the kalimeris or Japanese aster, is a species of flowering plant in the family Asteraceae, native to Korea and Japan. Locals occasionally collect its young leaves and cook them as a leaf vegetable.

A perennial reaching 1.5 ft (45 cm) high, and hardy in USDA zones 5 through 8, it is considered an easy plant for beginning gardeners, and can be grown "without fear of failure". There are a number of ornamental cultivars under its synonym Kalimeris yomena, with the variegated 'Shogun' being widely commercially available.

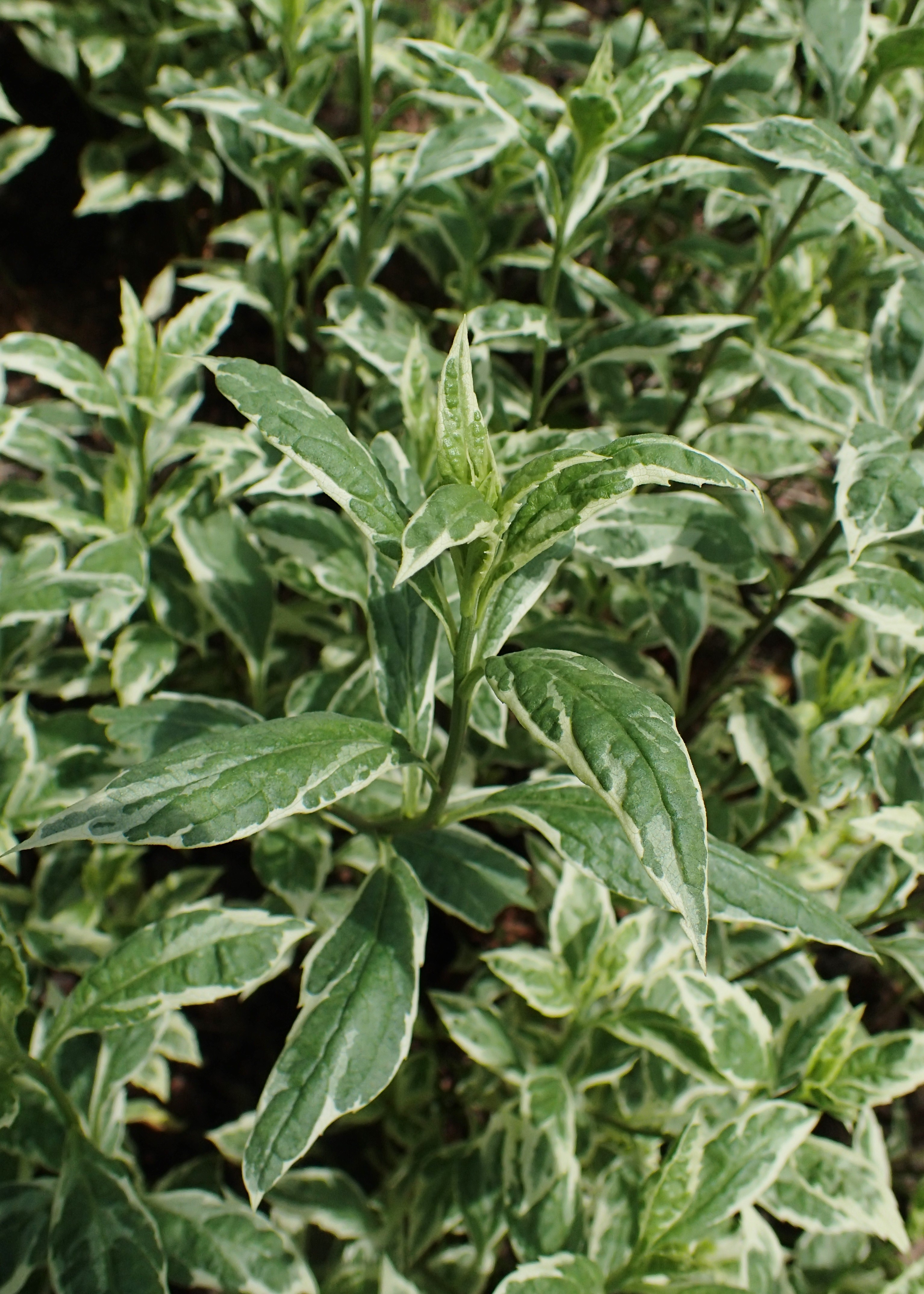
Variegated 'Shogun' leaves

== Subtaxa ==
The following varieties are accepted:

- Aster yomena var. angustifolius (Nakai) Soejima & Igari – Japan
- Aster yomena var. yomena – Korea, Japan
