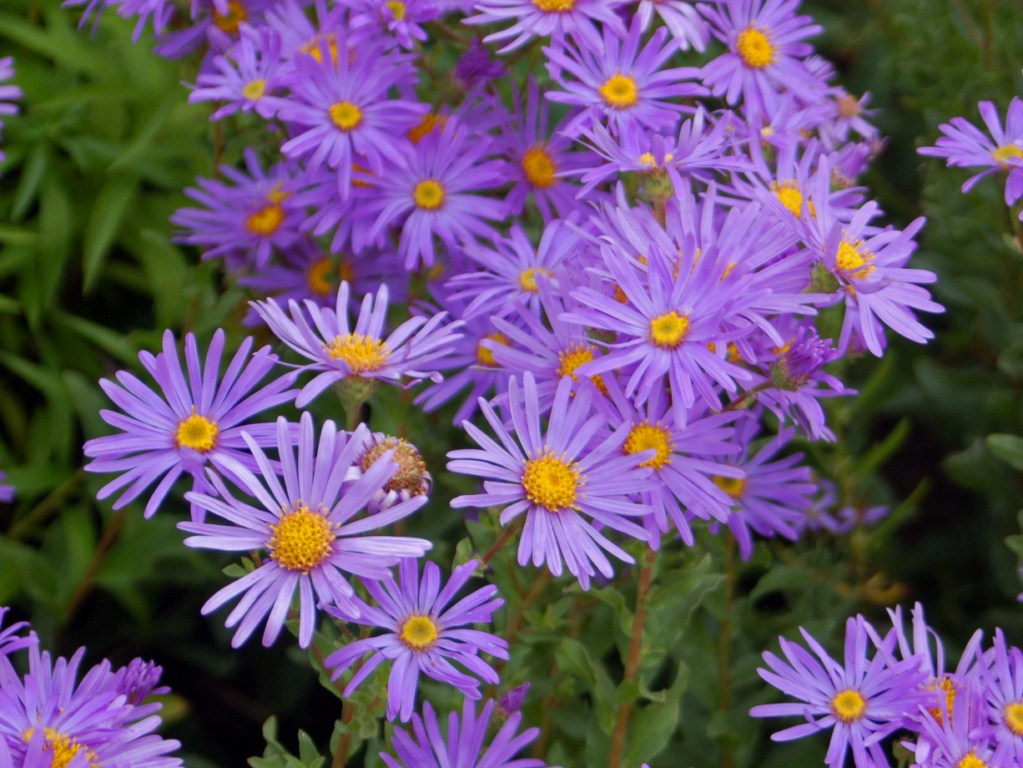
- Aster amellus

Scientific classification
- Kingdom: Plantae
- Clade: Tracheophytes
- Clade: Angiosperms
- Clade: Eudicots
- Clade: Asterids
- Order: Asterales
- Family: Asteraceae
- Subfamily: Asteroideae
- Tribe: Astereae
- Subtribe: Asterinae
- Genus: Aster; L.

Type species
- Aster amellus L.

Synonyms
- List: Asteromoea Blume; Bellidastrum Scop.; Bellidiaster Dumort.; Borkonstia Ignatov; Brachyaster Ambrosi; Chlamydites J.R.Drumm.; Gymnaster Kitam.; Hersilea Klotzsch; Heterochaeta DC.; × Heterokalimeris Kitam.; Heteropappus Less.; Hisutsua DC.; Homostylium Nees; Kalimares Raf.; Kalimeris (Cass.) Cass.; Kitamuraea Rauschert; Kitamuraster Soják; Kitamuria G.L.Nesom; Krylovia Schischk.; Leptocoma Less.; Margarita Gaudin; Martinia Vaniot; Metamyriactis G.L.Nesom; Miyamayomena Kitam.; Rhinactina Less.; Rhinactinidia Novopokr.; Rhynchospermum Reinw.; Sinobouffordia G.L.Nesom; Wardaster J.Small; Yonglingia G.L.Nesom; Zollingeria Sch.Bip.

= Aster (genus) =

Genus of flowering plants in the daisy family

Aster is a genus of perennial flowering plants in the family Asteraceae. Its circumscription has been narrowed, and it now encompasses around 170 species, all but one of which are restricted to Eurasia; many species formerly in Aster are now in other genera of the tribe Astereae. Aster amellus is the type species of the genus and the family Asteraceae.

The name Aster comes from the Ancient Greek word ἀστήρ (astḗr), meaning 'star', referring to the shape of the flower head. Many species, varieties, and hybrids, sometimes known as Michaelmas daisies for their late blooming, are popular as garden plants because of their attractive and colourful flowers. Aster species are used as food plants by the larvae of a number of Lepidoptera species.

== Circumscription ==
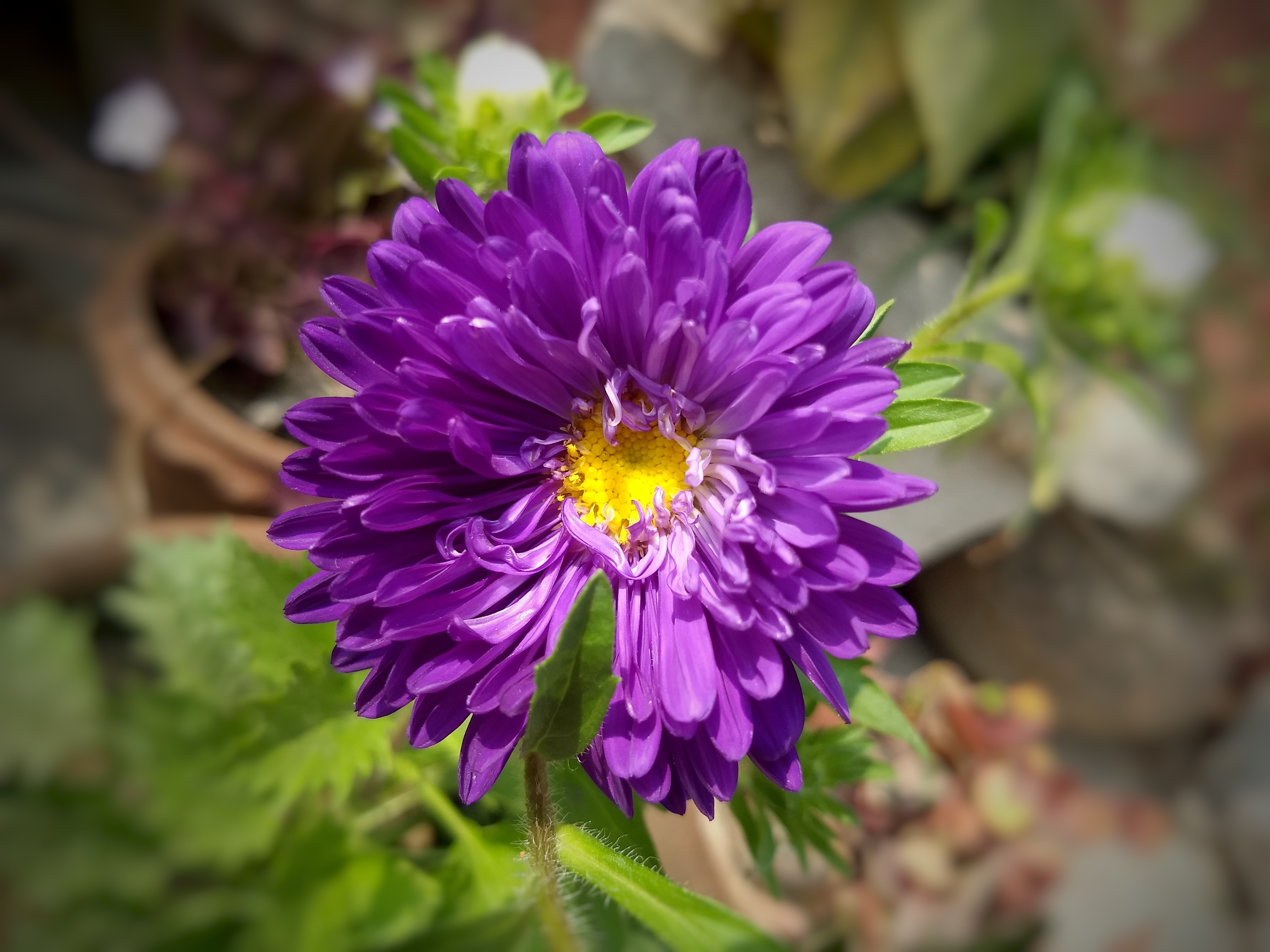
Multi layer petals Aster flower

The genus Aster once contained nearly 600 species in Eurasia and North America, but after morphologic and molecular research on the genus during the 1990s, it was decided that the North American species are better treated in a series of other related genera. After this split there are roughly 180 species within the genus, all but one being confined to Eurasia.

The New World species have now been reclassified in the genera Almutaster, Canadanthus, Doellingeria, Eucephalus, Eurybia, Ionactis, Oligoneuron, Oreostemma, Sericocarpus and Symphyotrichum, though all are treated within the same tribe, Astereae. The "China aster" is in the related genus Callistephus. Regardless of the taxonomic change, most are still widely referred to as "asters", or "Michaelmas daisies", because of their typical blooming period.

Inflorescence of an autumn aster

== Species ==
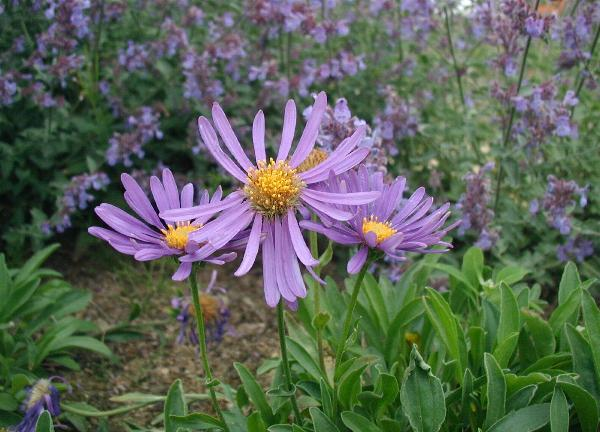
Aster alpinus is the only species of Aster (sensu stricto) that is native to North America; it is found in mountains across the Northern Hemisphere.

Plants of the World Online accepts 186 species as of August 2024. The species formerly known as Aster tripolium (sea aster) is now Tripolium pannonicum. The species formerly known as Aster linosyris (goldilocks) is now Galatella linosyris. Many species and a variety of hybrids and varieties are popular as garden plants because of their beautiful, attractive and colourful flowers. Aster species are used as food plants by the larvae of a number of Lepidoptera species. Asters can grow in all hardiness zones.

Selected species:

- Aster ageratoides Turcz. – rough-surface aster
- Aster alpinus L. – alpine aster
- Aster altaicus Willd.
- Aster amellus L. – European Michaelmas daisy, Italian aster
- Aster arenarius (Kitam.) Nemoto – beach-sand aster
- Aster bellidiastrum (L.) Scop.
- Aster formosanus Hayata
- Aster glehnii F.Schmidt – Ulleungdo aster
- Aster hayatae H.Lév. & Vaniot – Korean montane aster
- Aster hispidus Thunb.
- Aster iinumae Kitam. – perennial false aster
- Aster incisus Fisch. – incised-leaf aster
- Aster lautureanus (Debeaux) Franch. – connected aster, mountain aster
- Aster maackii Regel – Maack's aster
- Aster neoelegans Grierson
- Aster quitensis Willd. ex Spreng. (unplaced)
- Aster spathulifolius Maxim. – seashore spatulate aster
- Aster tataricus L.f. – Tatarian aster, Tatarinow's aster
- Aster tonglingensis G.J.Zhang & T.G.Gao
- Aster tongolensis Franch.
- Aster yomena (Kitam.) Honda

== Phytochemical Profile ==
- Flavonoids: These are commonly found in Asters and are known for their antioxidant properties. They may also impart color to the petals.
- Terpenoids: These could be responsible for the fragrance of some Aster flowers and are often studied for their potential medicinal properties.
- Saponins: These phytochemicals create frothy solutions when agitated in water and have potential antimicrobial properties.
- Alkaloids: Though less common in Asters, if present, they could provide a range of bioactivities, including potential toxicity.
- Phenolic Compounds: These include tannins and other polyphenolic substances, which may contribute to the plant's defense mechanisms.

== Hybrids and cultivars ==
Those marked agm have gained the Royal Horticultural Society's Award of Garden Merit.

- Aster × frikartii (A. amellus × A. thomsonii) Frikart's aster
  - Aster × frikartii 'Mönch' agm
  - A. × frikartii 'Wunder von Stäfa' agm
- 'Kylie' (A. novae-angliae 'Andenken an Alma Pötschke' × A. ericoides 'White Heather')
- 'Ochtendgloren' agm (A. pringlei hybrid)
- 'Photograph' agm

== In history ==
The Hungarian revolution of 31 October 1918, became known as the "Aster Revolution" due to protesters in Budapest wearing this flower.

== In culture ==
One of the few flowers left around Michaelmas in the British Isles is the Michaelmas daisy (another name for asters), hence the rhyme: "The Michaelmas daisies, among dead weeds, Bloom for St Michael's valorous deeds..."

In the UK, national collections of asters are held at Old Court Nurseries and Picton Garden in Colwall, in Herefordshire (near Malvern, Worcestershire), and at Upton House, Warwickshire.
