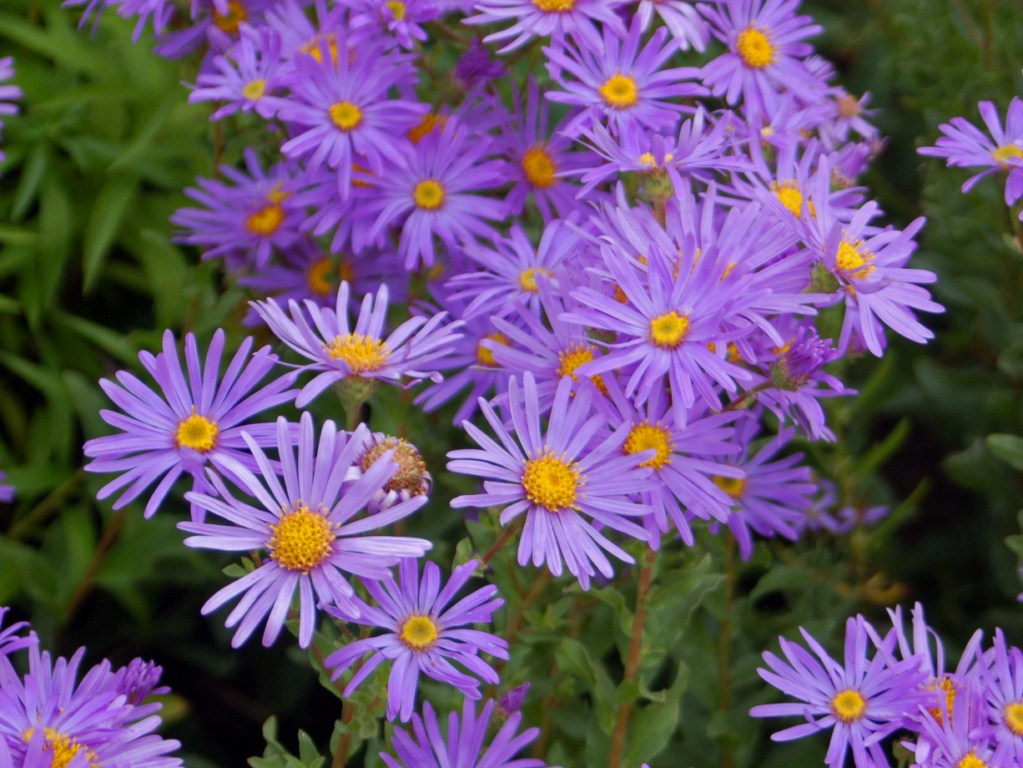

Scientific classification
- Kingdom: Plantae
- Clade: Embryophytes
- Clade: Tracheophytes
- Clade: Angiosperms
- Clade: Eudicots
- Clade: Asterids
- Order: Asterales
- Family: Asteraceae
- Genus: Aster
- Species: A. amellus

Binomial name
- Aster amellus L.

Synonyms
- Several, including: Aster elegans Nees

= Aster amellus =

Species of plant

Aster amellus, the European Michaelmas daisy, is a perennial herbaceous plant and the type species of the genus Aster and the family Asteraceae.

== Etymology ==
The specific name amellus is first used in the Georgics (Book IV, 271–280), a poem of the Latin poet Publius Vergilius Maro (70 BCE – 19 BCE), but the etymology is obscure and uncertain.

The English common name derives from the flowers being in bloom during Michaelmas (the Feast of St. Michael the archangel).

== Description ==
Aster amellus reaches on average a height of 20–50 centimetres (7.9–19.7 in). The stem is erect and branched, the leaves are dark green. The basal leaves are obovate and petiolated, the cauline ones are alternate and sessile, increasingly narrower and lanceolate. The flowers are lilac. The flowering period extends from July through October. The hermaphroditic flowers are either self-fertilized (autogamy) or pollinated by insects (entomogamy). The seeds are an achene that ripens in October.

== Distribution ==
This plant is present on the European mountains from the Pyrenees and the Alps to the Carpathians. Outside Europe it is located in western Asia (Turkey), the Caucasus, Siberia, South Asia (Uttarakhand, India) and Central Asia (Kazakhstan).

== Cultivation ==
Asters are valued in the garden for late summer and autumn colour in shades of blue, pink and white. This species has several cultivars of ornamental garden use. The following have gained the Royal Horticultural Society's Award of Garden Merit:-

- 'Framfieldii'
- 'Jacqueline Genebrier'
- 'King George'
- 'Veilchenkönigin'
- Aster × frikartii 'Mönch'

== Habitat ==
The typical habitat is rocky limy areas, the edges of the bushes and copses, but also the sub-alpine meadows, marshy places and lake sides. It prefers calcareous and slightly dry substrate with basic pH and low nutritional value, at an altitude of 0–800 metres (0–2,625 ft) above sea level.

== Synonyms ==
- Amellus officinalis Gaterau
- Amellus vulgaris Opiz
- Aster acmellus Pall.
- Aster albus Willd. ex Spreng.
- Aster amelloides Hoffm.
- Aster amellus subsp. bessarabicus (Bernh. ex Rchb.) Soó
- Aster atticus Pall.
- Aster bessarabicus Bernh. ex Rchb.
- Aster collinus Salisb.
- Aster elegans Nees
- Aster noeanus Sch.Bip. ex Nyman
- Aster ottomanum Velen.
- Aster pseudoamellus DC.
- Aster purpureus Gueldenst. ex Ledeb.
- Aster scepusiensis Kit. ex Kanitz
- Aster tinctorius Wallr.
- Aster trinervius Gilib.
- Diplopappus asperrimus (Nees) DC.
- Diplopappus laxus Benth.
- Galatella asperrima Nees
- Kalimares amellus (L.) Raf. ex B.D.Jacks. (1894)

== In literature ==
The Michaelmas Daisy. was one of Letitia Elizabeth Landon's earliest published poems (1820).

== Gallery ==
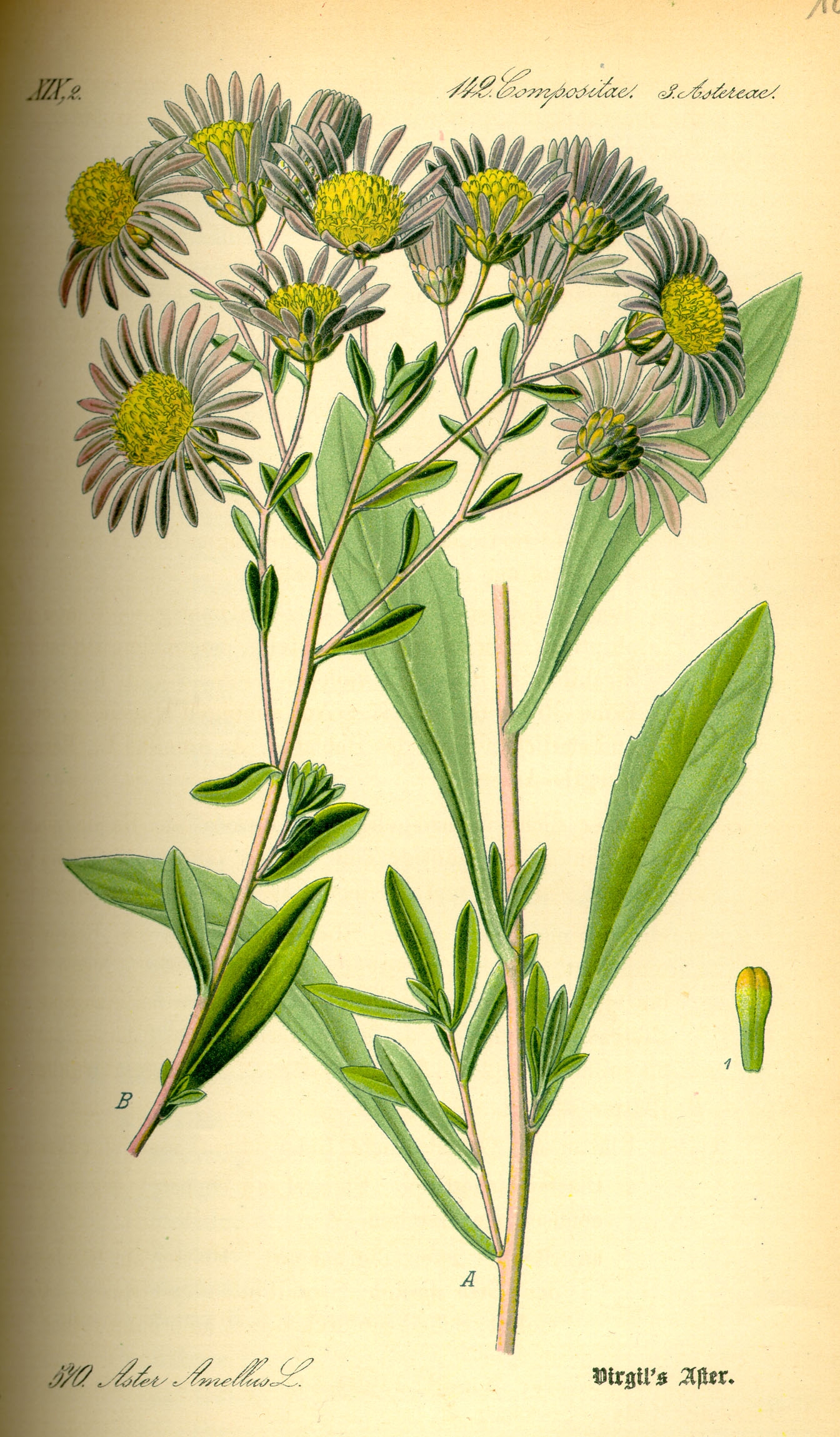
Illustration from "Flora von Deutschland, Österreich und der Schweiz", 1885

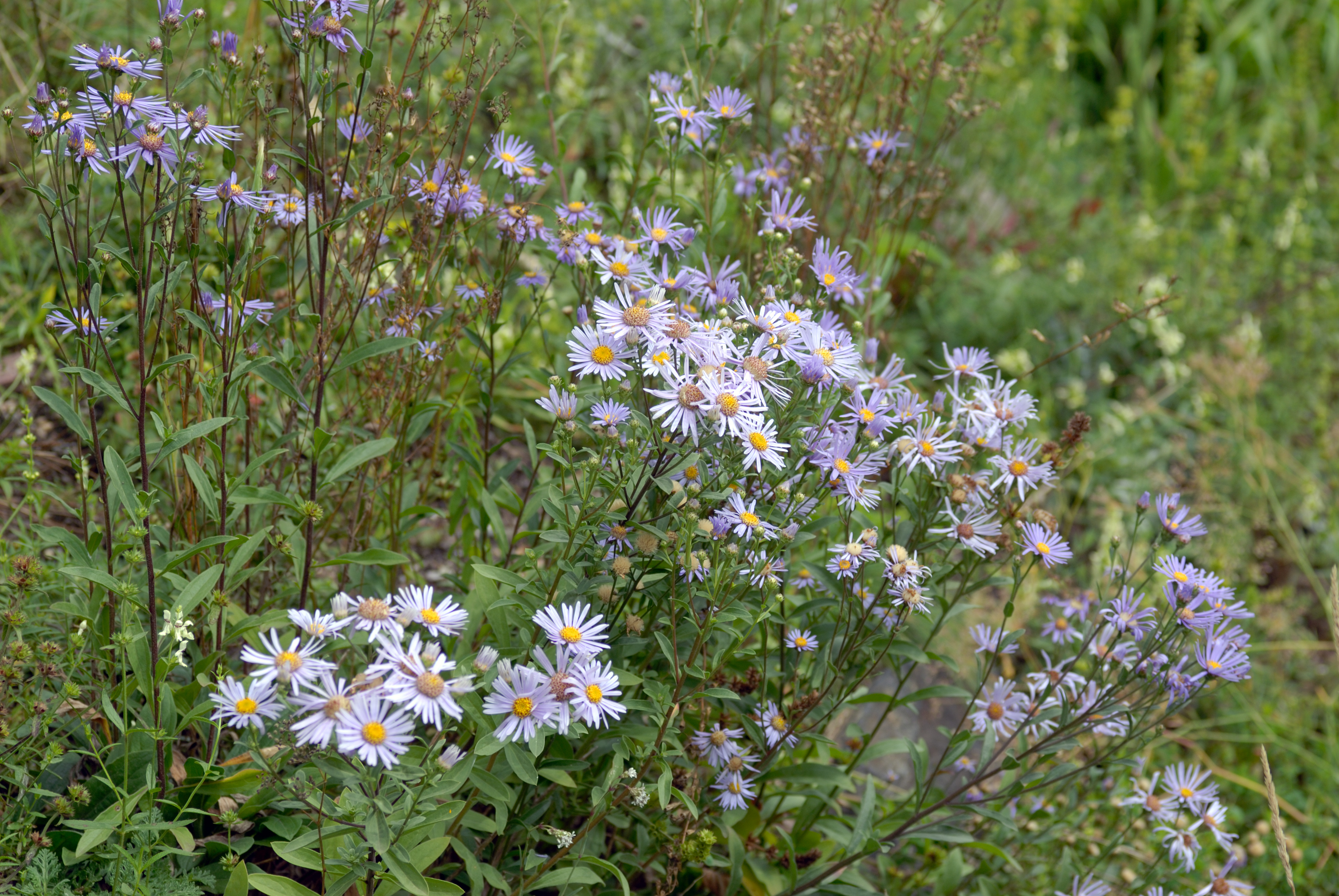

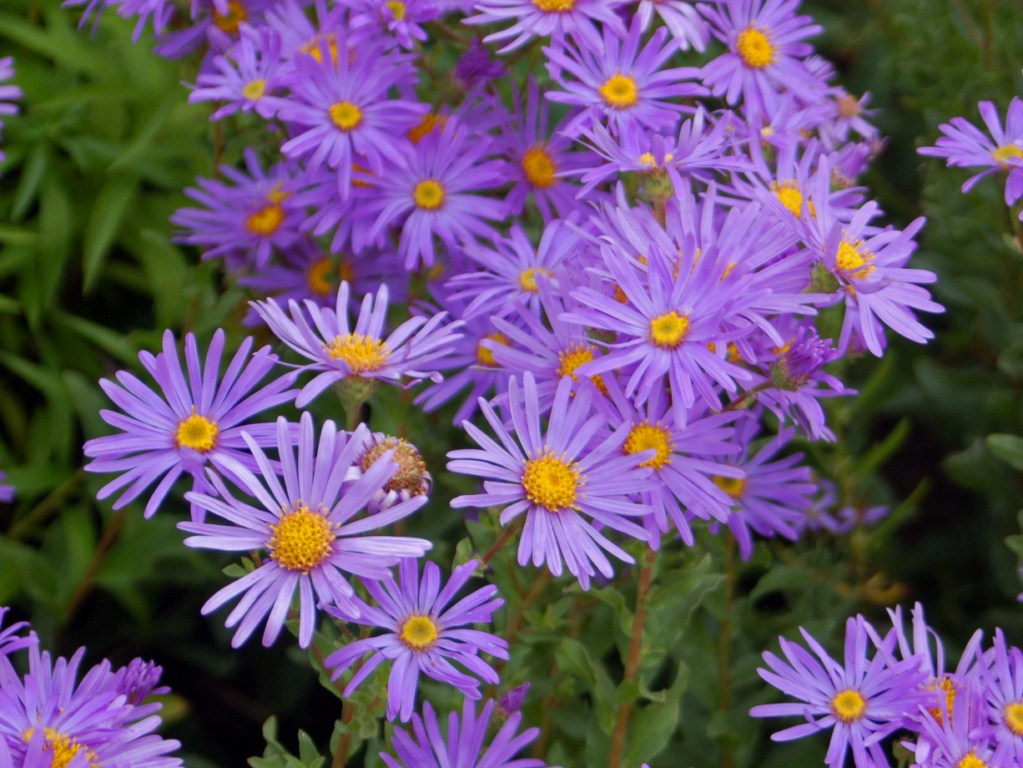
Flowers

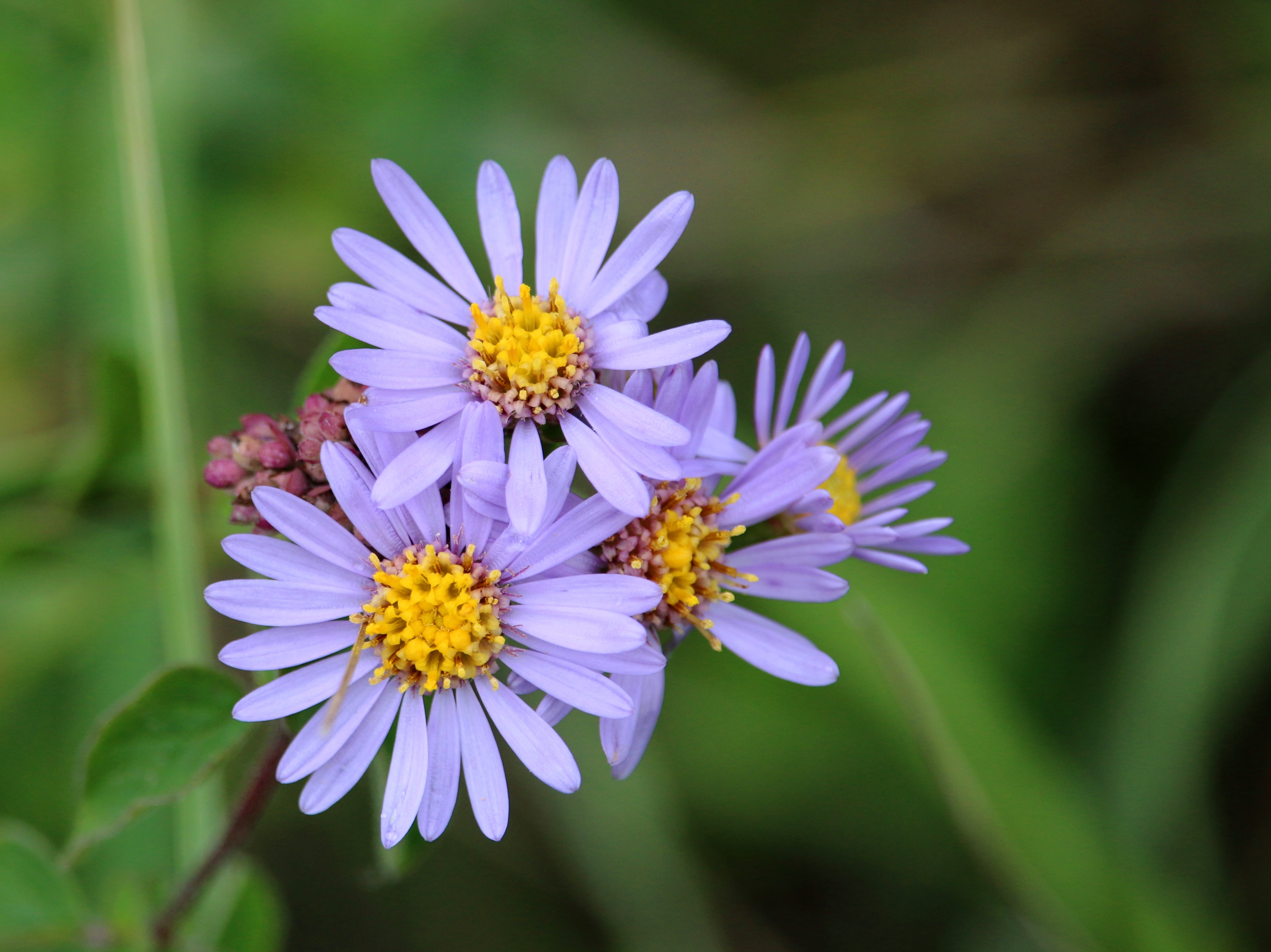

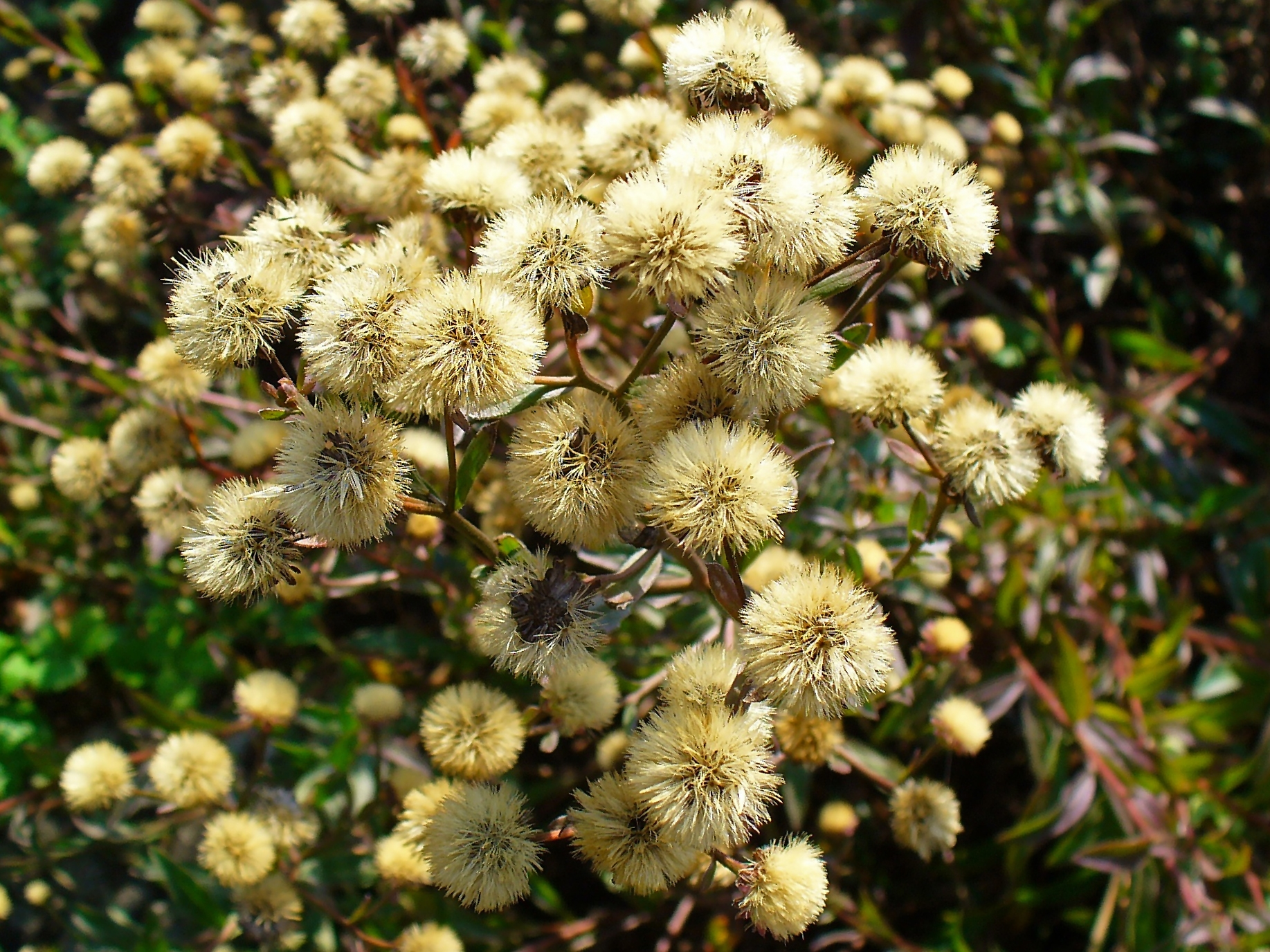
Fruits
