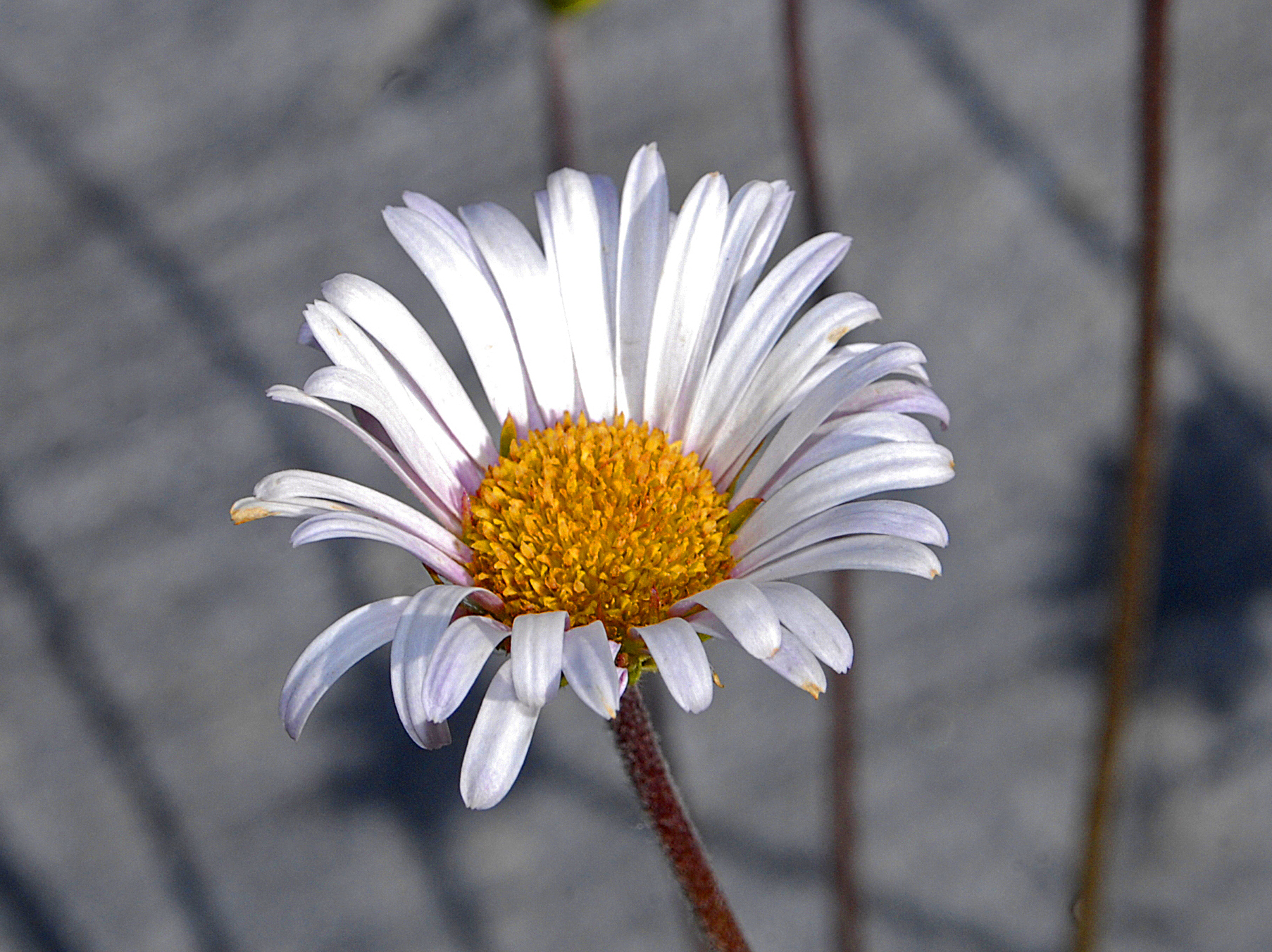

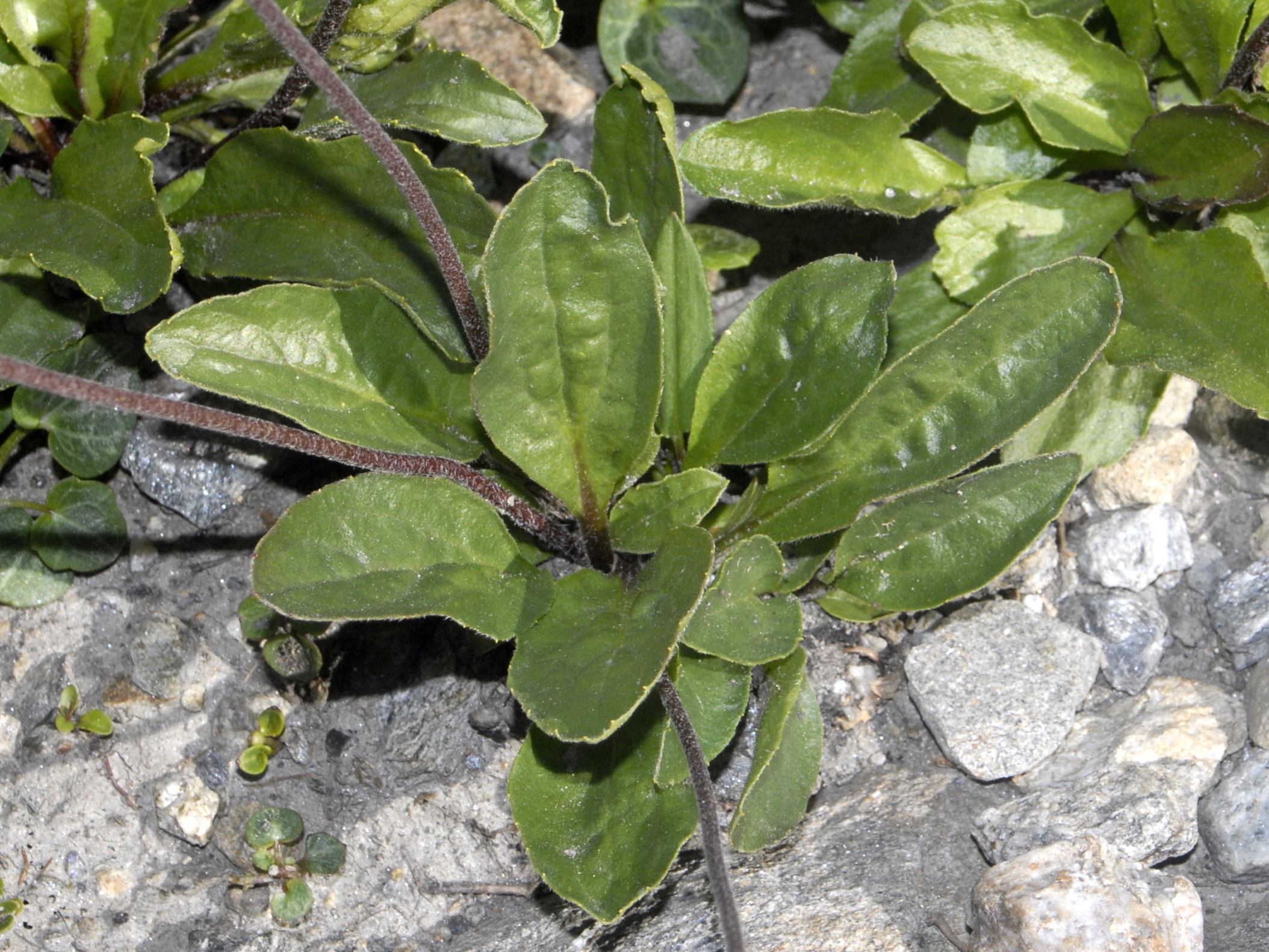

Scientific classification
- Kingdom: Plantae
- Clade: Tracheophytes
- Clade: Angiosperms
- Clade: Eudicots
- Clade: Asterids
- Order: Asterales
- Family: Asteraceae
- Genus: Aster
- Species: A. bellidiastrum

Binomial name
- Aster bellidiastrum (L.) Scop.

Synonyms
- Bellidiastrum michelii Cass.

= Aster bellidiastrum =

Species of flowering plant

Aster bellidiastrum (also known as false aster) is a species of perennial plant from the family Asteraceae.

== Description ==
A. bellidiastrum is a clump-forming plant that grows up to 20-30cm in height. Leaves are rounded to obovate to elliptic, broadly toothed, measuring 6cm long or more, all basal. Flowers are stellate, measuring up to 4cm in diameter, the rays white or pinkish, appearing from early summer onwards.

== Habitat ==
Central and southern Europe, in the mountains, it favours open places or clearings in forests up to 2800m.
