= Giovanni Battista Trener =

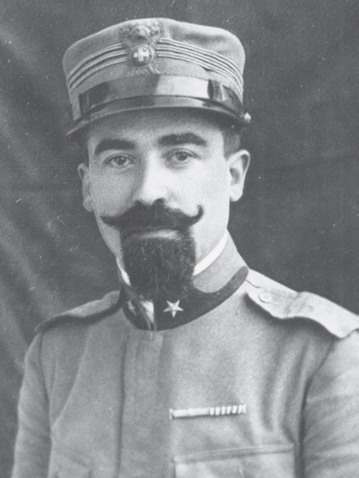
- Born: 7 January 1877
- Died: 5 May 1954 (aged 77)

Giovanni (or Gian) Battista Trener (7 January 1877 in Fiera di Primiero – 5 May 1954 in Trento) was an Italian geologist and director of the Tridentine Museum of Natural Sciences (Museo tridentino di scienze naturali) from 1922 to 1932 and from 1946 to 1954 respectively.

== Biography ==
He studied at the gymnasium in Trento and then in chemistry and natural sciences at the University of Vienna. From 1900 to 1914 he worked at KuK Geologische Anstalt.

He collaborated with Cesare Battisti (directed along the magazine of studies Tridentum, active from 1898 to 1913) of which also became a brother marrying his wife's sister Ernesta Bittanti, Irene. In 1913 he became a member of the Accademia Roveretana degli Agiati.

At the beginning of World War I he voluntarily enrolled in the Italian army and was the supreme commander and collaborator of Pietro Badoglio during the armistice of Villa Giusti.

In 1922 he founded the Civic Museum of Natural History of Trento (Museo tridentino di scienze naturali), of which he was director from 1922 to 1932, and was probably left in opposition to the Fascist regime, and again from 1946 to 1954, the year of his death.

He was director of the National Research Center's Alpine Studies Center (Consiglio Nazionale delle Ricerche).

In his memory, the Grotto Calgeron was named "GB Trainer Cave".

== Works ==
- With Cesare Battisti, Lake Terlago and Karst Phenomena of the Valleys of Fricca, Dess and Lakes, Trento: Zippel, 1898
- Earthquakes in Trentino: Historical News Sec. III-XVIII, Trento: Ed. Trentina, 1903
- Geological observations on the solid flow of avia (in Trentino), Trento: Tip. Ed. Mutilated and Invalid, 1923
- The discovery of radioactive sources in Merano: methods and results, Rome: Italian Society for the Advancement of Science, 1937
- Geographical and Geological Writings, Trento: Natural History Museum, 1957

== Sources ==
1. Annalia Dongilli, A newspaper for "The people": the cultural enterprise of Battisti spouses: (1900-1914), Trento, UCT editions, 2006, p. 16.
