= Ulmus bergmanniana var. bergmanniana =

Scientific classification
- Kingdom: Plantae
- Clade: Tracheophytes
- Clade: Angiosperms
- Clade: Eudicots
- Clade: Rosids
- Order: Rosales
- Family: Ulmaceae
- Genus: Ulmus
- Species: U. bergmanniana C.K.Schneid.
- Variety: U. b. var. bergmanniana

Trinomial name
- Ulmus bergmanniana var. bergmanniana

Variety of tree

U. bergmanniana var. bergmanniana is endemic to mountain slopes at elevations of 1500–2600 m in the Chinese provinces of Anhui, Gansu, Henan, Hubei, Hunan, Jiangxi, Shaanxi, Shanxi, Sichuan, Yunnan, and Zhejiang.

== Description ==
The tree is distinguished by Fu (2002) as having "Leaf blade adaxially densely hirsute when young; (later) glabrescent with tufted hairs only remaining in axil of veins. Flowers and fruits February–April".

== Pests and diseases ==
No information available.

== Cultivation ==
This variety is extremely rare in cultivation in Europe and North America. There are no known cultivars of this taxon, nor is it known to be in commerce.

== Accessions ==
=== Europe ===
- Grange Farm Arboretum, Sutton St James, Spalding, Lincolnshire, UK. Acc. no. not known.
