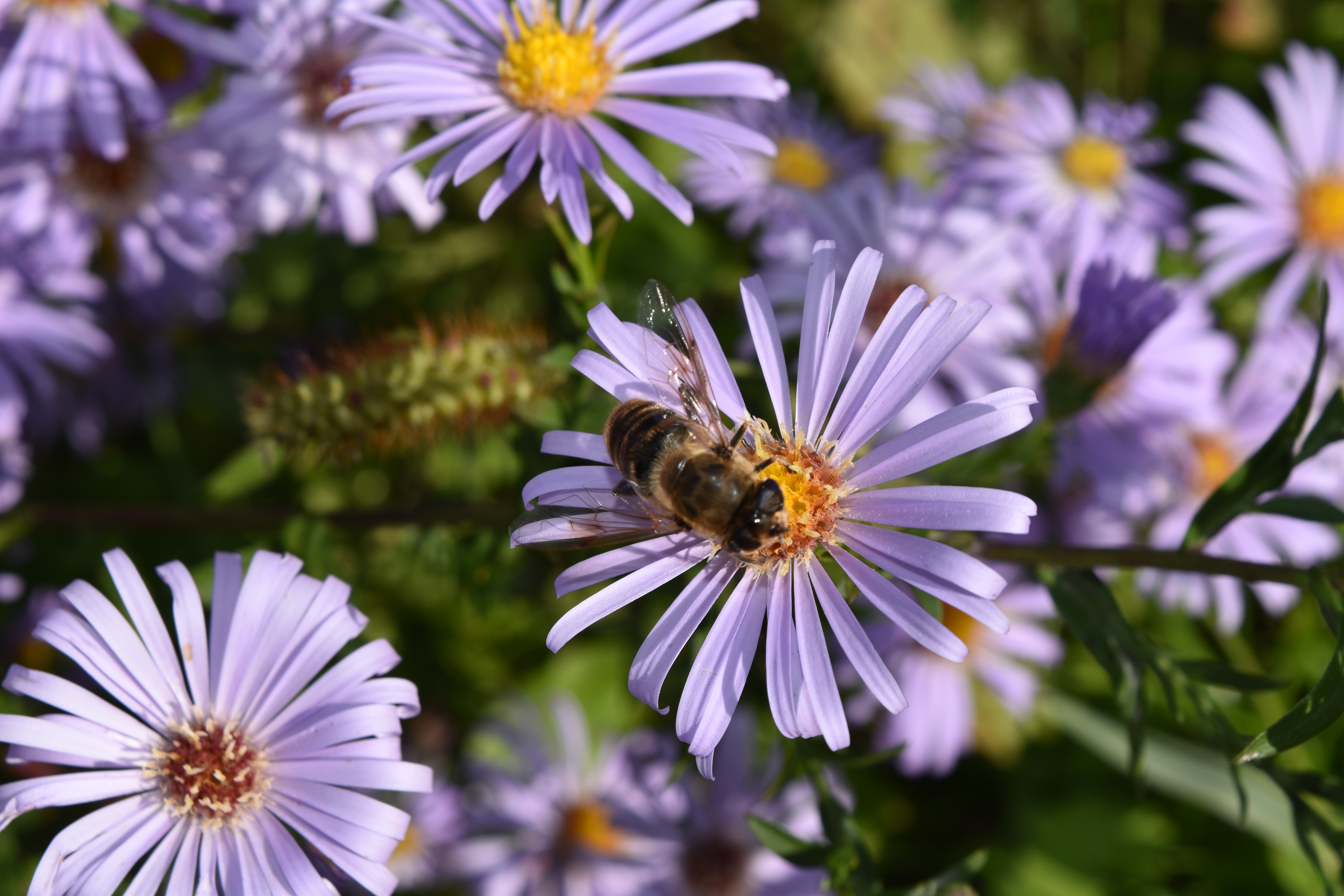

Scientific classification
- Kingdom: Plantae
- Clade: Tracheophytes
- Clade: Angiosperms
- Clade: Eudicots
- Clade: Asterids
- Order: Asterales
- Family: Asteraceae
- Genus: Aster
- Species: A. × frikartii

Binomial name
- Aster × frikartii Silva Tar. & C.K.Schneid.

= Aster × frikartii =

Nothospecies of flowering plant

Aster × frikartii (or Aster frikartii), called Frikart's aster, is a hybrid of European Michaelmas daisy, Aster amellus, and Thomson's aster, Aster thomsonii (from the western Himalayas). It was created by Swiss plant breeder Carl Ludwig Frikart. Its cultivars 'Mönch' and 'Wunder von Stäfa' have gained the Royal Horticultural Society's Award of Garden Merit, and are also considered by them to be good plants to attract pollinators.
