= Konrad Meyer =

German Nazi official, SS-Oberführer (1901–1973)

Konrad Meyer-Hetling
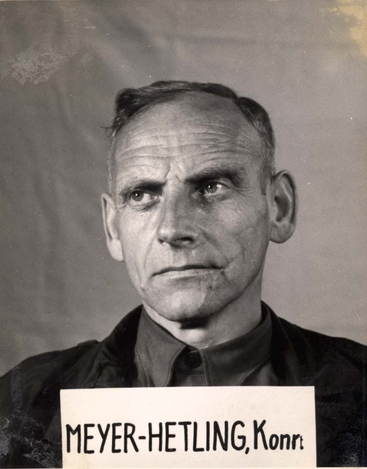
- Meyer-Hetling in U.S. custody
- Born: 15 May 1901; Lower Saxony, German Empire
- Died: 25 April 1973 (aged 71); Einbeck, West Germany
- Political party: Nazi Party
- Status: Deceased
- Motive: Nazism
- Conviction: Membership in a criminal organization
- Trial: RuSHA trial
- Penalty: Time served
- SS career
- Allegiance: Germany
- Branch: Schutzstaffel

Konrad Meyer-Hetling (15 May 1901 – 25 April 1973) was a German agronomist and SS-Oberführer. He is best known for his involvement in the development of Generalplan Ost.

== Early life ==
Meyer was born in Salzderhelden, near Einbeck, in southern Lower Saxony, the son of a school teacher. He studied agronomy at the University of Göttingen and received his doctorate in 1926 with a thesis on crop production. He became an assistant at the university and did his habilitation in 1930.

From 1930 to 1933, Meyer worked as a docent at the University of Göttingen, and in 1934, he became a full professor at the University of Jena. The same year, he became a professor at the University of Berlin. In November 1934 he became a consultant for the Reich Ministry of Science and Education on the reformation of German agricultural education and research. Meyer was one of the key agricultural scientists and spatial planners of the Nazi era, and served as the chief editor of the main journals of the field.

== Generalplan Ost ==
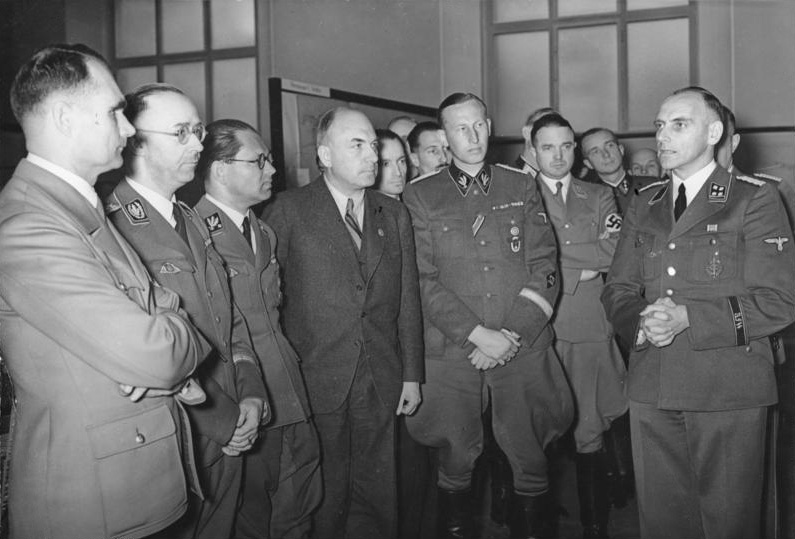
Rudolf Hess, Heinrich Himmler, Philipp Bouhler, Fritz Todt and Reinhard Heydrich (from left), listening to Meyer at a Generalplan Ost exhibition, 20 March 1941

Meyer joined the NSDAP on 1 February 1932 (member number 908,471), and the SS on 20 June 1933 (member number 74,695). In 1935, he was recruited to the SS Race and Settlement Main Office (RuSHA). In 1939, he became the head of the Planning Office under Himmler's office of Reich Commissioner for the Consolidation of German Nationhood (RKF), and he also worked for Himmler's personal staff.

In early 1940, the Reich Security Main Office (RSHA) produced, with Meyer's collaboration, the initial version of Generalplan Ost (General Plan East), a plan for the Germanization of Eastern Europe. Meyer's subordinates in RKF's creating the memorandum included geographer Walter Christaller and landscape architect Heinrich Friedrich Wiepking-Jürgensmann. Meyer transferred to the Waffen-SS in the late summer of 1944. Following SS officer training at SS-Panzer-Grenadier-Schule Kienschlag, Meyer was, in April 1945, appointed liaison officer attached to the 10th SS Panzer Division Frundsberg.

== Later life ==
After the war, Meyer was charged by the US authorities in the RuSHA Trial. He was found guilty of being a member of a criminal organization (SS) but not guilty of war crimes or crimes against humanity. He was released in 1948, and in 1956, he was appointed professor of agriculture and regional planning at Leibniz University Hannover, where he worked until his retirement, in 1968.
