= Ulmus bergmanniana var. lasiophylla =

Scientific classification
- Kingdom: Plantae
- Clade: Tracheophytes
- Clade: Angiosperms
- Clade: Eudicots
- Clade: Rosids
- Order: Rosales
- Family: Ulmaceae
- Genus: Ulmus
- Species: U. bergmanniana
- Variety: U. b. var. lasiophylla

Trinomial name
- Ulmus bergmanniana var. lasiophylla C. K. Schneid.

Synonyms
- Ulmus lasiophylla C. K. Schneid. (W. C. Cheng)

Variety of tree

Ulmus bergmanniana var. lasiophylla C. K. Schneid. (Hairy-leaved Bergmann's elm) is endemic to China, on mountain slopes at elevations of 2100–2900 m in Gansu, Shaanxi, north-west Sichuan, south-east Xizang (formerly Tibet), and north-west Yunnan.

== Description ==
The tree is distinguished by Fu (2002) as having "Leaf blade adaxially with densely curved pubescence. Flowers and fruits February - April".

== Cultivation ==
Var. lasiophylla is cold hardy; in artificial freezing tests at the Morton Arboretum the LT50 (temp. at which 50% of tissues die) was found to be - 27.7 °C. There are no known cultivars of this taxon, nor is it known to be in commerce.

== Accessions ==
=== North America ===
- Chicago Botanic Garden, US. No accession details; planted in West Collections Area.
- Morton Arboretum, US. Acc. no. 45–95. Collected from the wild at an unrecorded site in China.
- United States National Arboretum, Washington, D.C., US. Acc. nos. 76218, 68978.

=== Europe ===
- Glendoick Gardens, Perthshire, UK; two trees (2017), source 'SSNY 205'.
- Grange Farm Arboretum , Lincolnshire, UK. Acc. no. 1057.
- Royal Botanic Garden Edinburgh, UK. Acc. no. 19933397. Wild collected in Kunming, China, by Gothenburg Expedition.
