= Edward Timms =

Edward Timms (1937 in Windlesham, England – 21 November 2018 in Brighton, England) OBE, FBA was Research Professor and a former director of the Centre for German-Jewish Studies (which he founded in 1994) at the University of Sussex. His work mainly focused on Karl Kraus and Freud. Timms was also a Life Fellow of Gonville and Caius College, Cambridge. His two-volume work Karl Kraus – Apocalyptic Satirist (1986 and 2005) is concerned with Kraus's satirical responses to Habsburg Vienna, his rejection of both the First World War and Nazism. Kraus had been the subject of his PhD.

He died on 21 November 2018 at the age of 81.

== Works ==
- Karl Kraus, Apocalyptic Satirist: Culture and Catastrophe in Habsburg Vienna (1986) Yale University Press ISBN 0-300-04483-6 reviews:
- Karl Kraus, Apocalyptic Satirist: The Post-War Crisis and the Rise of the Swastika (2005)
- Karl Kraus und Die Fackel: Aufsätze Zur Rezeptionsgeschichte = Reading Karl Kraus: Essays on the Reception of Die Fackel (German) (with G. J. Carr)
- Theatre and Performance in Austria: From Mozart to Jelinek (editor, with Richie Robertson)
- Vienna 1900: from Altenberg to Wittgenstein (editor, with Ritchie Robertson). Edinburgh: Edinburgh University Press, c1990
- Taking up the Torch, Sussex University Press, 2011

== Decorations and awards ==
- 2002: Karl von Vogelsang State Prize for the History of Science Society
- 2008: Austrian Cross of Honour for Science and Art, 1st class

== See also ==
- Reception theory
