= Cesare Battisti (politician) =

Italian Irredentist (1875–1916)

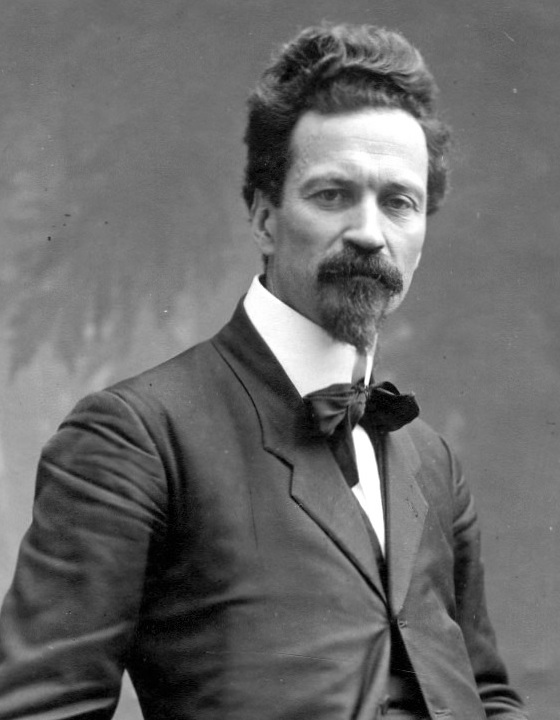
- Cesare Battisti in Milan, 1915
- Born: Giuseppe Cesare Battisti; 4 February 1875; Trento, Tyrol, Austria-Hungary
- Died: 12 July 1916 (aged 41); Trento, Tyrol, Austria-Hungary
- Spouse: Ernesta Bittanti
- Children: 3

Cesare Battisti (4 February 1875 – 12 July 1916) was an Italian patriot, geographer, socialist politician and journalist of Austrian citizenship, who became a prominent Irredentist at the start of World War I.

== Biography ==
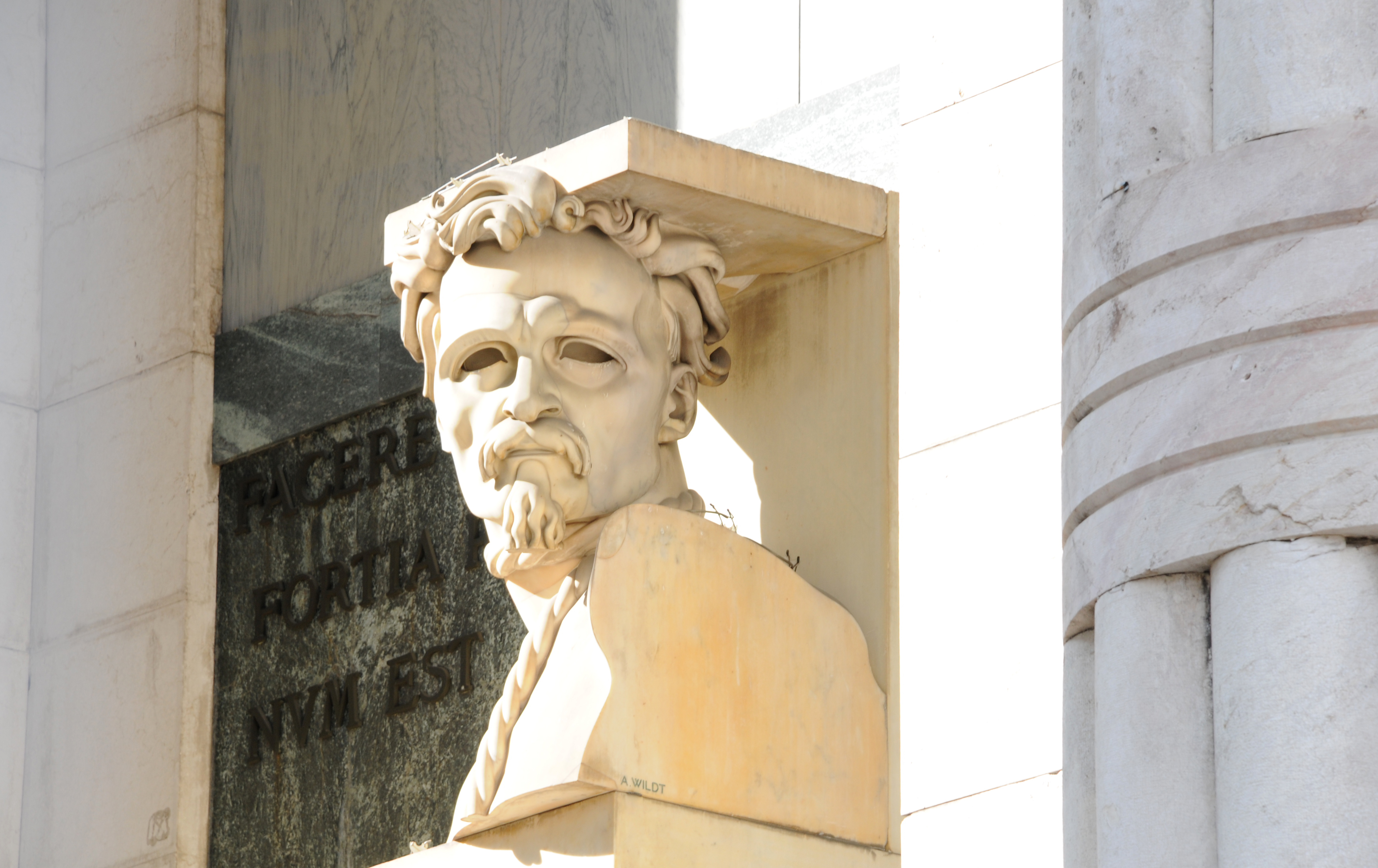
Bust of Cesare Battisti by Adolfo Wildt at the Bolzano Victory Monument

He was born the son of a merchant at Trento, a city with a predominantly Italian-speaking population, which at the time was part of the Cisleithanian crown land of Tyrol in Austria-Hungary. Battisti attended the University of Florence, where he became a follower of the Italian irredentism movement, aiming at the unification of his Trentino homeland with the Kingdom of Italy, though contrary to activists like Ettore Tolomei and Gabriele d'Annunzio he did not claim the predominantly German-speaking areas of South Tyrol up to the Brenner Pass.

In 1899, he married Ernesta Bittanti in a civil ceremony. The couple had three sons.

A journalist by profession and a member of the Social Democratic Workers' Party of Austria, he was elected as a representative to the Tyrolean Landtag assembly at Innsbruck as well as to the Austrian Imperial Council (Reichsrat) at Vienna in 1911, where he vainly tried to obtain a status of autonomy for the Trentino region. Disgruntled by Austro-Hungarian attitudes to minorities in their empire, Battisti agreed to construct a military guide for the Italians to the Austrian provinces that bordered Italy.

When Austria-Hungary mobilised in August 1914, Battisti fled with his family to the Kingdom of Italy, where he held public meetings demanding Italy join the Triple Entente forces against Austria. With Italy's entry into World War I following the 1915 London Pact, though still an Austrian citizen, Battisti fought against the Austro-Hungarian Army in the Alpini Corps at the Italian Front.

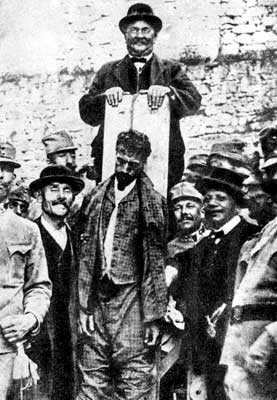
This image was used in the work The Last Days of Mankind by Karl Kraus, which has been described as the Austrian national drama, symbolic for the oppression in Austria, particularly towards non-German people. Depicted is the irredentist Reichsrat and provincial assembly deputy Cesare Battisti after his execution by the for Austria typical garrote (1916) in the moat of the Castle of Trento, together with the infamous executioner Josef Lang.

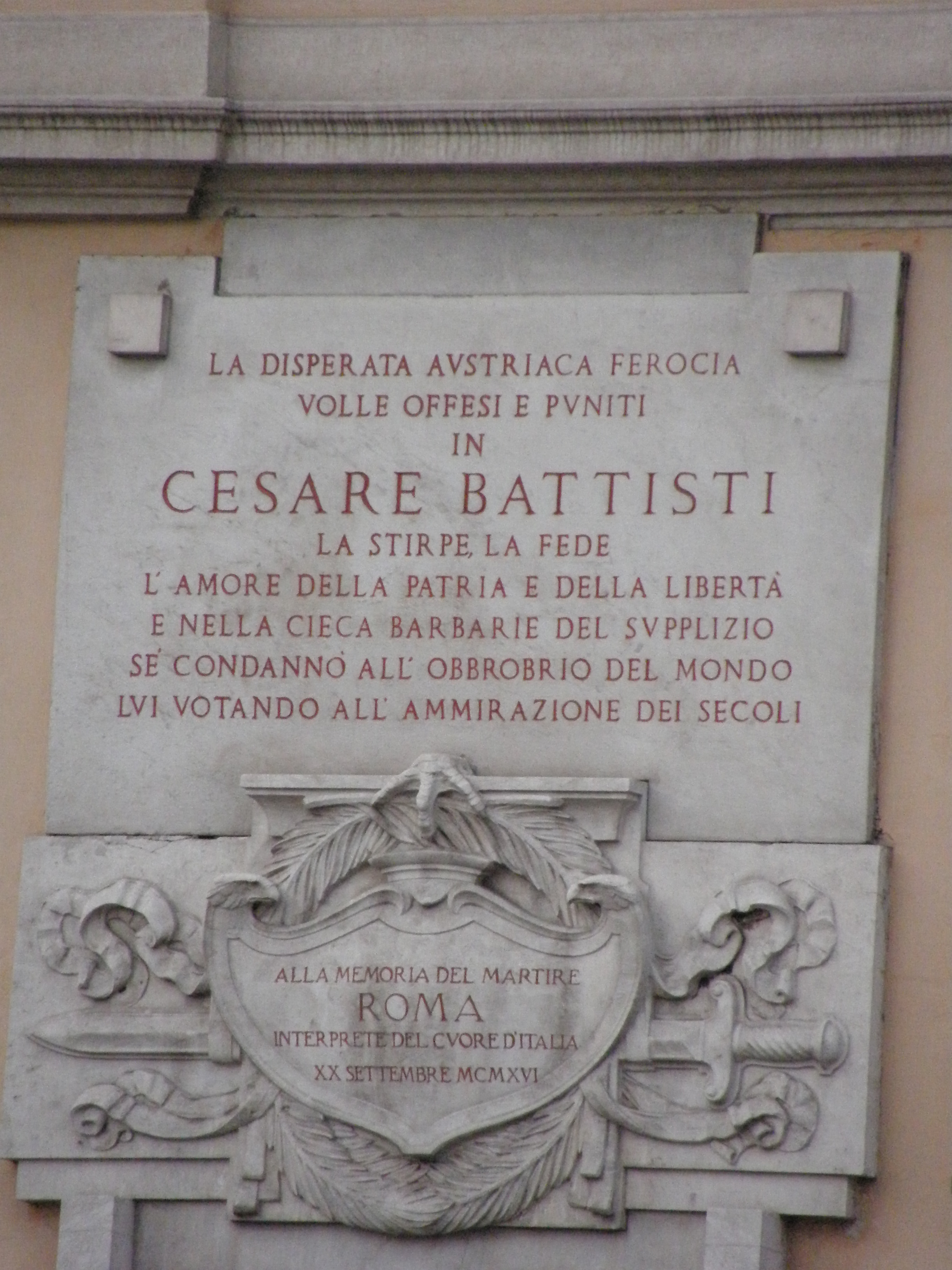
Battisti is remembered at Via Cesare Battisti, near Piazza Venezia, in Rome.

After the Battle of Asiago, he and his 2nd Lt Fabio Filzi were captured by the Austrian forces on 10 July 1916 and faced a court-martial in his hometown, Trento, at Buonconsiglio Castle, charged with high treason. Though Battisti officially enjoyed parliamentary immunity, he was sentenced to death by strangulation. He requested a military execution by firing squad so as not to dishonour the Italian Army uniform, but the judge denied his request and instead procured for him some shabby civilian clothes. Dressed in these, he was executed (hanged and garrotted) the same day, the brutality of which was increased by the fact that executioner Josef Lang botched the job so that Battisti actually was hanged twice.

The smiling execution squad posed with his body for photographs, which, when later published, did severe damage to Austria's reputation. The author Karl Kraus applied a picture as frontispiece of his 1922 play Die letzten Tage der Menschheit (The Last Days of Mankind). Battisti is considered a national hero in Italy, and several memorials were dedicated to him in Rome as well as in his hometown, Trento and at the Bolzano Victory Monument. Both Trento and Bolzano had been under Austrian control until 1918.

== See also ==
- Guglielmo Oberdan
- Istrian-Dalmatian exodus
- Italia irredenta
- Nazario Sauro

== Works ==
- Opere geografiche, (2005). Trento: La Finestra editrice (in Italian).
- Scritti politici (2006). Trento: La Finestra editrice (in Italian).
- Guida alle Giudicarie (1909). Trento: Monauni editore (in Italian).
- Il Trentino (1910). Novara (in Italian).

== Bibliography ==
- Stefano Biguzzi (2008). Cesare Battisti. UTET (in Italian).
- Karl Kraus (1918; 1922). Gli ultimi giorni dell'umanità. Vienna (in Italian).
- Diego Leoni ed. (2008). Come si porta un uomo alla morte: la fotografia della cattura e dell'esecuzione di Cesare Battisti. Trento: Museo storico in Trento, provincia di Trento (in Italian).
- Thompson, Mark (2009) [2008]. The White War: Life and Death on the Italian Front, 1915-1919. London: Faber and Faber. ISBN 978-0-571-25008-0.
- Massimo Tiezzi (2007). L'eroe conteso. La costruzione del mito di Cesare Battisti negli anni 1916–1935. Trento: Museo Storico in Trento (in Italian).
