= The Last Days of Mankind =

Play by Karl Kraus

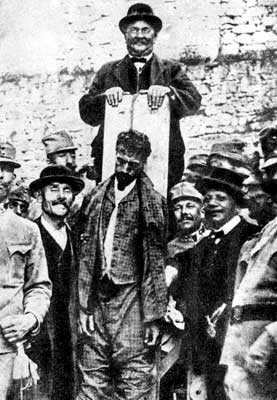
This image was used in the work The Last Days of Mankind by Karl Kraus, which has been described as the Austrian national drama, symbolic for the oppression in Austria, particular towards non-german people. Depicted is the irredentist Reichsrat and provincial assembly deputy Cesare Battisti after his execution by the for Austria typical garrote (1916) in the moat of the Castle of Trento, together with the infamous executioner Josef Lang.

The Last Days of Mankind (German: Die letzten Tage der Menschheit) is a grotesque drama by Karl Kraus. The play is a perceptive and bitter reckoning with the horrors of World War I. One third of the play is drawn from documentary sources. Written between 1915 and 1922, the drama consists of more than 200 scenes. Kraus depicts the depths of war in all its grotesque and equally unbearable absurdity — from the cynical delusion of politicians to the disinformation of the press to indifference and dullness of the population.

The Last Days of Mankind is considered one of the most important of Kraus's works. It was written as a reading piece; the author could not imagine a performance onstage given the megalomania of the work. It has to this day never been staged in its entirety.

Salzburg Festival 2014
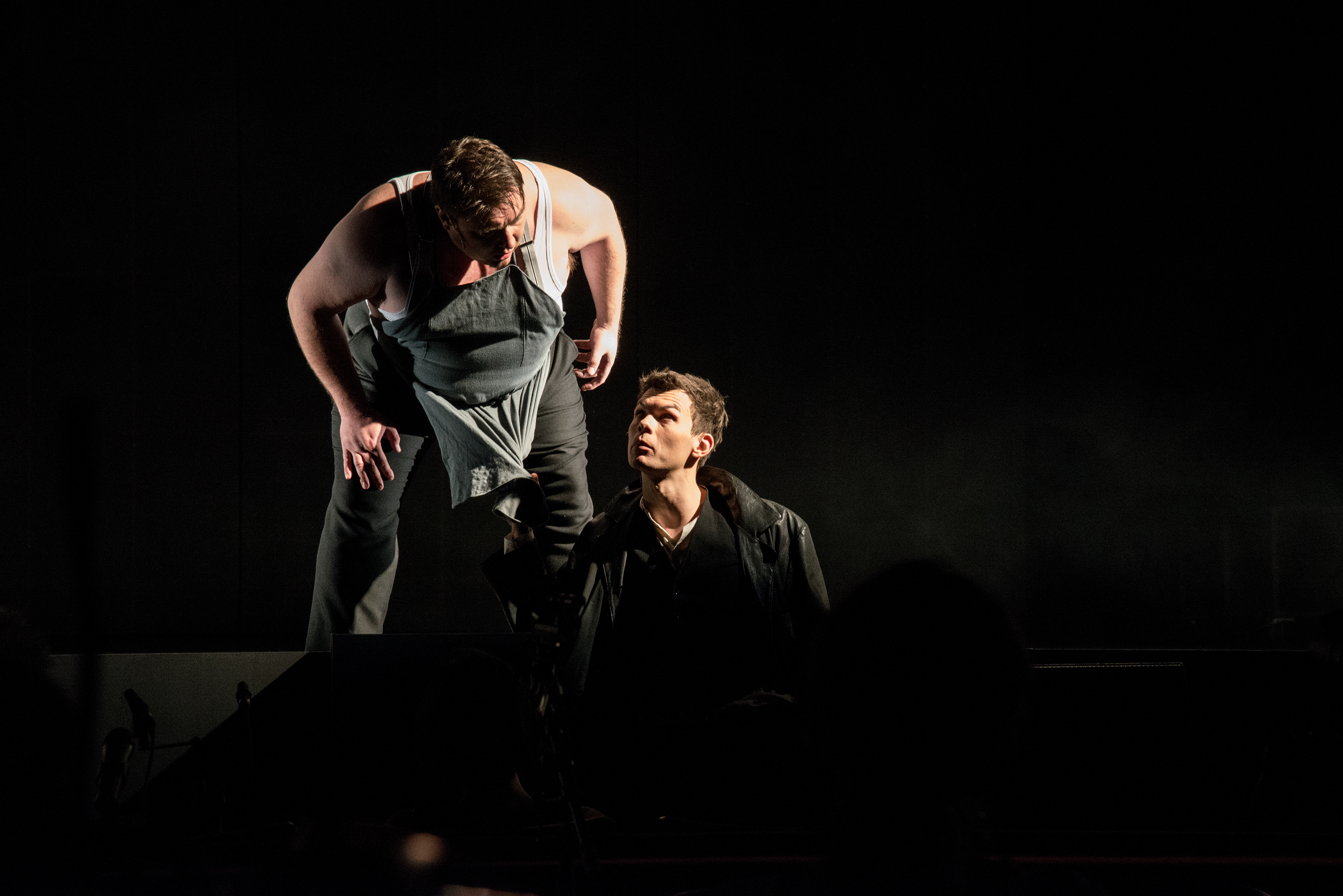

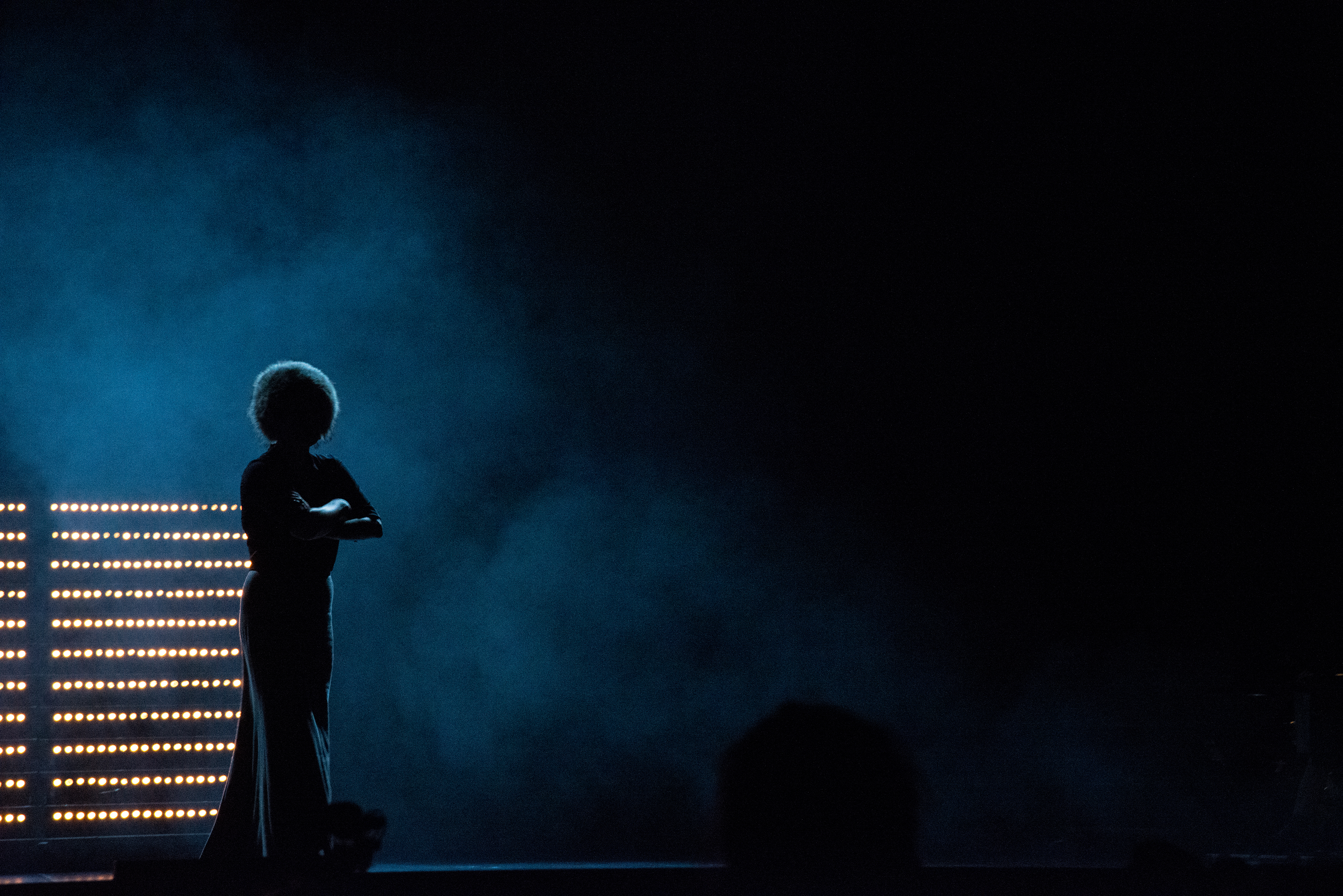

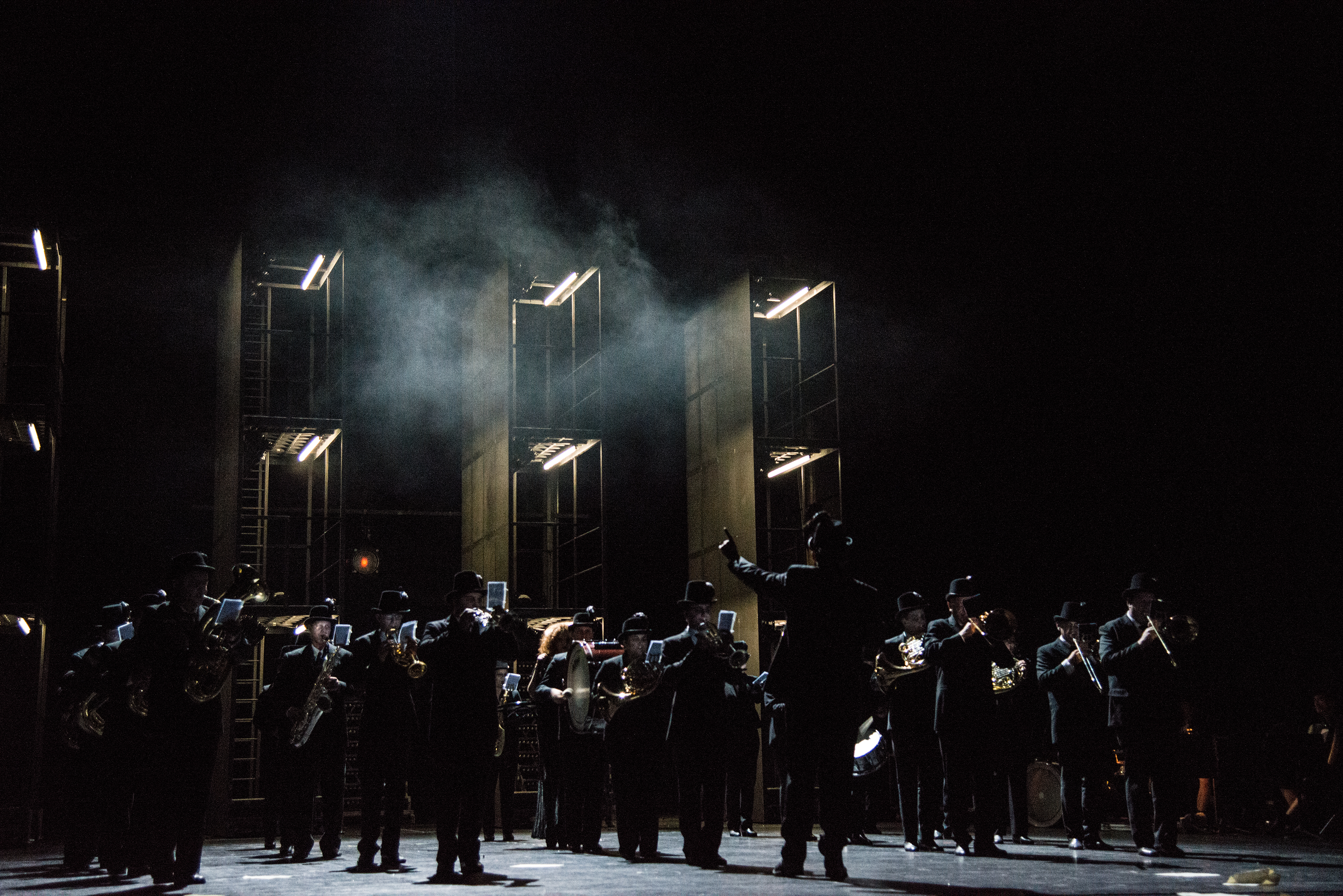

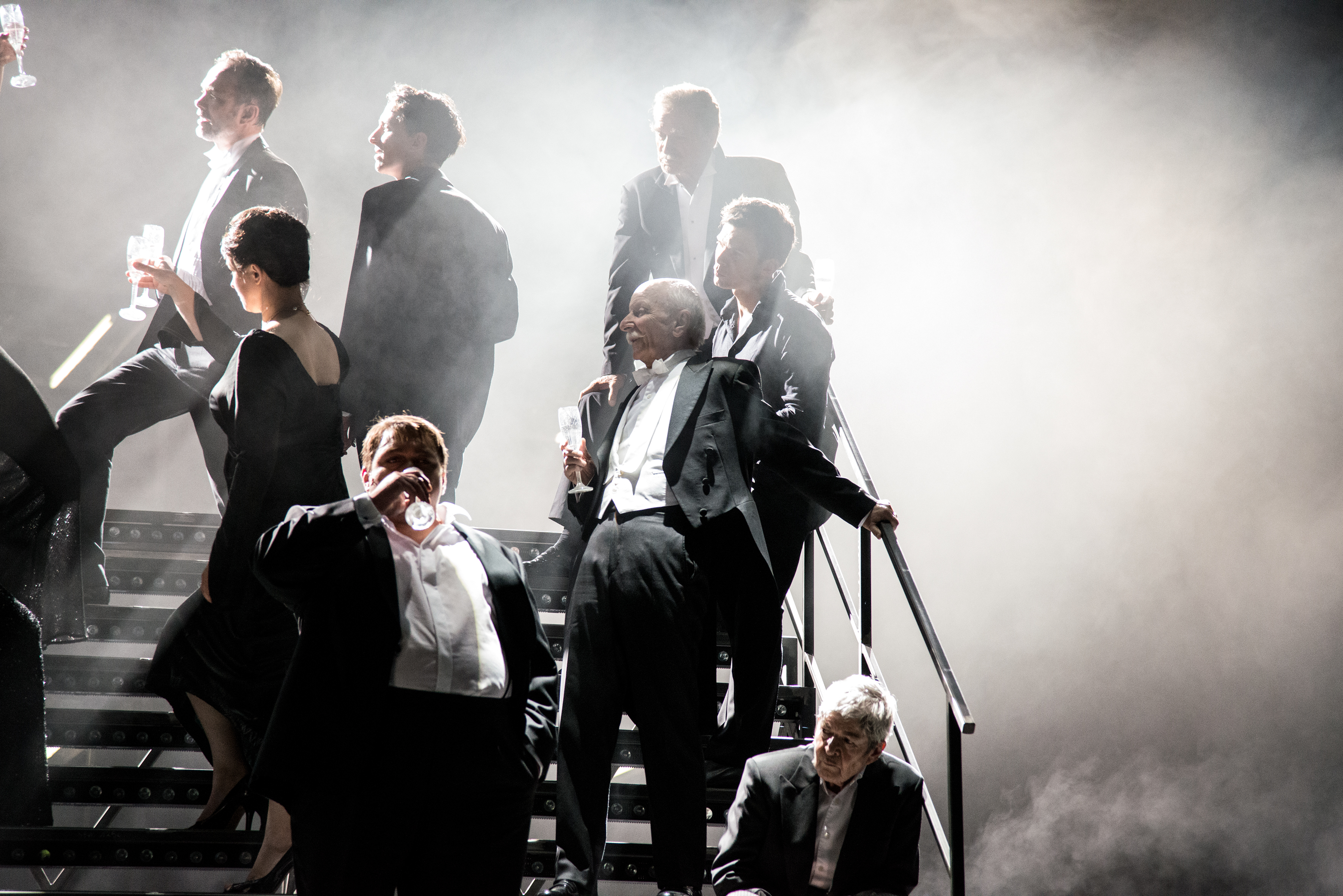

== Preface ==
It was written for a "Martian theater" because no earthly stage could ever fully recreate this pandemonium, according to the preface. The play wasn't released for the stage until 1928.

Most of the play is highly realistic, except the final scenes which are of expressionist genre.

== Performances ==
- 2004 La Mama Theatre (Melbourne), d: Justus Neumann
- 2014 Salzburg Festival, d: Georg Schmiedleitner
- 2025 Salzburg Festival, d: Dušan David Pařízek
- 2026 Peacock Theatre, Salamanca Arts Centre (Hobart), d: Justus Neumann
