= A Crown for Zion =

1898 polemic by Karl Kraus

- Created: 1898
- Author: Karl Kraus
- Media type: Essay
- Subject: Antisemitism, Anti-Zionism, Judaism, Zionism

A Crown for Zion (German: Eine Krone für Zion) is an 1898 anti-Zionist polemic written by the Austrian-Jewish writer Karl Kraus.

== About ==
As with many Viennese Jews living during the late 1800s and early 1900s, Kraus was opposed to the Zionist movement. The essay mocks Theodor Herzl, one of the founders of the Zionist movement. The word "Krone" is a pun, is it can refer to a crown or a krone in the German language. A single krone was the price of entry for the first Zionist Conference in Basel, Switzerland. In the essay, Kraus claims that antisemitism is the essence of the Zionist movement, that Zionist goals are antisemitic, and that Jewish Zionists are "Jewish antisemites". Kraus accused Herzl and the Zionist movement of supporting antisemites by promoting the idea that Jews have multiple loyalties, and promoting their idea that Jews should leave their countries. Kraus was a vocal supporter of Jewish assimilation who opposed the separatist nature of Zionism. Kraus himself has been widely criticized for using antisemitic language and railing against what he called "Jewish capitalism" and the "Jewish Press". He demanded that Jews should give up Judaism and seek "redemption through total assimilation".

== See also ==
- Jewish assimilation
- Zionist antisemitism
