= Vrchotovy Janovice =

Market town in Central Bohemian Region, Czech Republic

- Market town
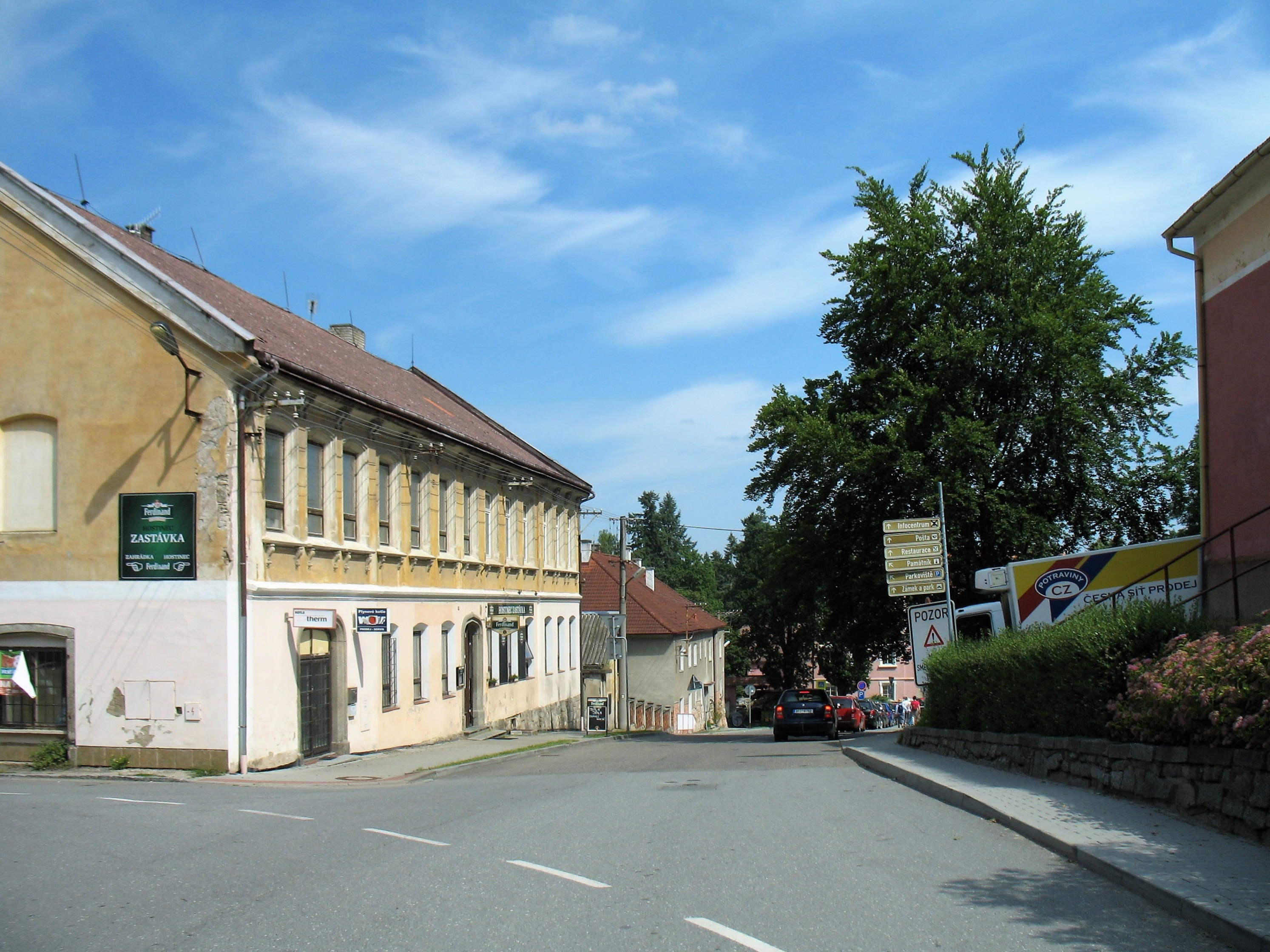
- A street next to the church

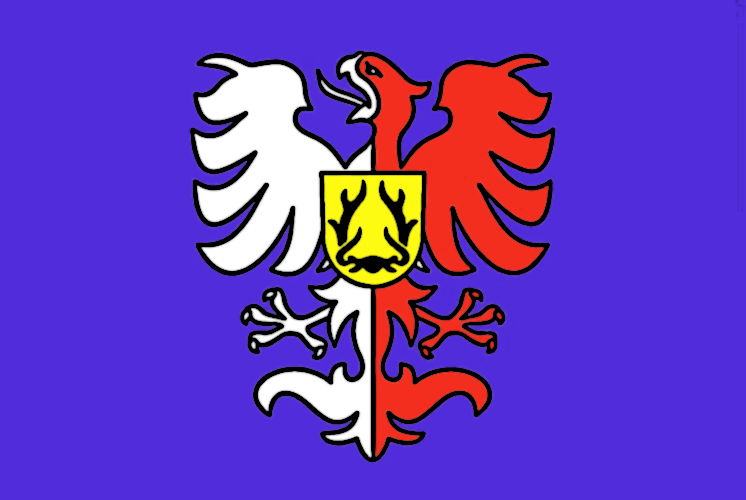
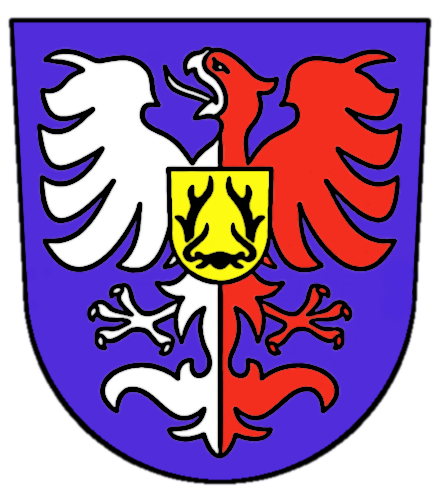
- Flag Coat of arms

- Location in the Czech Republic
- Coordinates: 49°40′0″N 14°34′40″E
- Country: Czech Republic
- Region: Central Bohemian
- District: Benešov
- First mentioned: 1243

Area
  - Total: 23.08 km^{2} (8.91 sq mi)
- Elevation: 427 m (1,401 ft)

Population (2026-01-01)
  - Total: 1,079
  - Density: 46.75/km^{2} (121.1/sq mi)
- Time zone: UTC+1 (CET)
  - Summer (DST): UTC+2 (CEST)
- Postal code: 257 53
- Website: www.vrchotovyjanovice.eu

Vrchotovy Janovice (Czech pronunciation: [ˈvr̩xotovɪ ˈjanovɪtsɛ]) is a market town in Benešov District in the Central Bohemian Region of the Czech Republic. It has about 1,100 inhabitants. The market town is located in the Benešov Uplands.

The town is known for Vrchotovy Janovice Castle, the former home of arts patron Sidonie Nádherná of Borutín and a meeting place for prominent Central European writers and artists. During World War II, the market town was incorporated into an SS training area, its inhabitants were displaced, and three detention facilities were established there, including a subcamp of the Flossenbürg concentration camp.

== Administrative division ==
Vrchotovy Janovice consists of ten municipal parts (in brackets population according to the 2021 census):

- Vrchotovy Janovice (799)
- Braštice (17)
- Hůrka (1)
- Libohošť (18)
- Manělovice (7)
- Mrvice (32)
- Rudoltice (23)
- Šebáňovice (51)
- Sedlečko (27)
- Velká Lhota (51)

== Etymology ==
The name Janovice, meaning "the village of Jan's people", was derived from the personal name of its presumed founder. The prefix Vrchotovy was added in the 15th century and came from the subsequent owners, the Vrchota of Vrchotice family. In the 16th–19th centuries, the market town was predominantly called simply Janovice. Since the 1890s, the official name of the market town has been Vrchotovy Janovice.

== Geography ==
Vrchotovy Janovice is located about 15 kilometres (9 mi) southwest of Benešov and 45 km (28 mi) south of Prague. It lies in the Benešov Uplands. The highest point in the municipal territory is the hill Ohraženka at 577 m (1,893 ft). The stream Janovický potok and several of its small tributaries flow through the market town. The area is rich in fishponds, including Zrcadlo and Libohošťský rybník, which are supplied by the Janovický potok.

== History ==
=== Early history ===
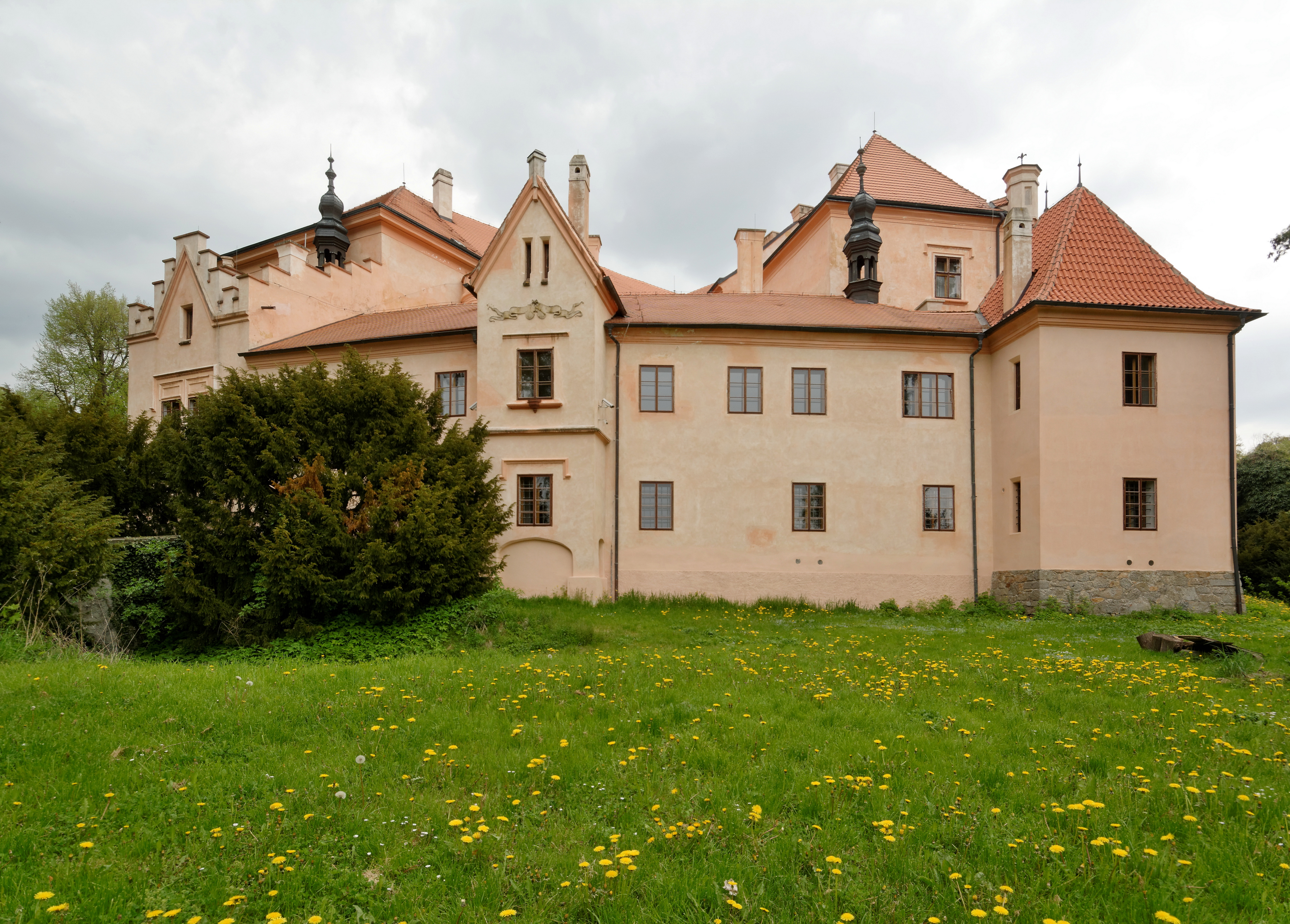
Vrchotovy Janovice Castle

The settlement probably originated around a Romanesque private church and a small courtyard in the final third of the 12th or beginning of the 13th century. The existence of the settlement is documented in 1224, when the local fortress was held by a nobleman named Jan. The first written mention of the name Janovice is from 1243, when it was owned by Konrád of Janovice (probably a son of Jan). Herbard of Janovice, who held it in c. 1336–1356, established the market town next to the original village, had rebuilt the church in the Gothic style and had built a small water castle. The Lords of Janovice transferred their principal residence to Vysoký Chlumec around 1385.

=== 15th–19th centuries ===
At the turn of the 14th and 15th centuries, the castle briefly passed to the Sternberg family. The Vrchota of Vrchotice family acquired it in the 1430s and changed the name of the market town. They owned it until 1528. The Lords of Říčany bought the estate in 1540 and converted the water castle into a Renaissance residence in 1579–1589. After briefly belonging to Hynek of Roupov, Jan Prostiborský of Vrtba bought the estate in 1594. The Vrtba family rebuilt the castle in the late Baroque and Rococo styles between 1750 and 1766. In 1787, at their request, Emperor Joseph II granted the settlement the right to hold annual cattle markets. The estate passed by inheritance to Count František Josef Wratislaw of Mitrovice in 1807. The Wratislaw of Mitrovice family gave the castle its present Neo-Gothic form in 1857–1858 before the indebted estate was sold to Baron Karel Ludvík Nádherný of Borutín in 1879.

The local volunteer fire brigade, SDH Vrchotovy Janovice, was founded in 1886. In 1894, the railway line was opened.

=== 20th century and modern history ===
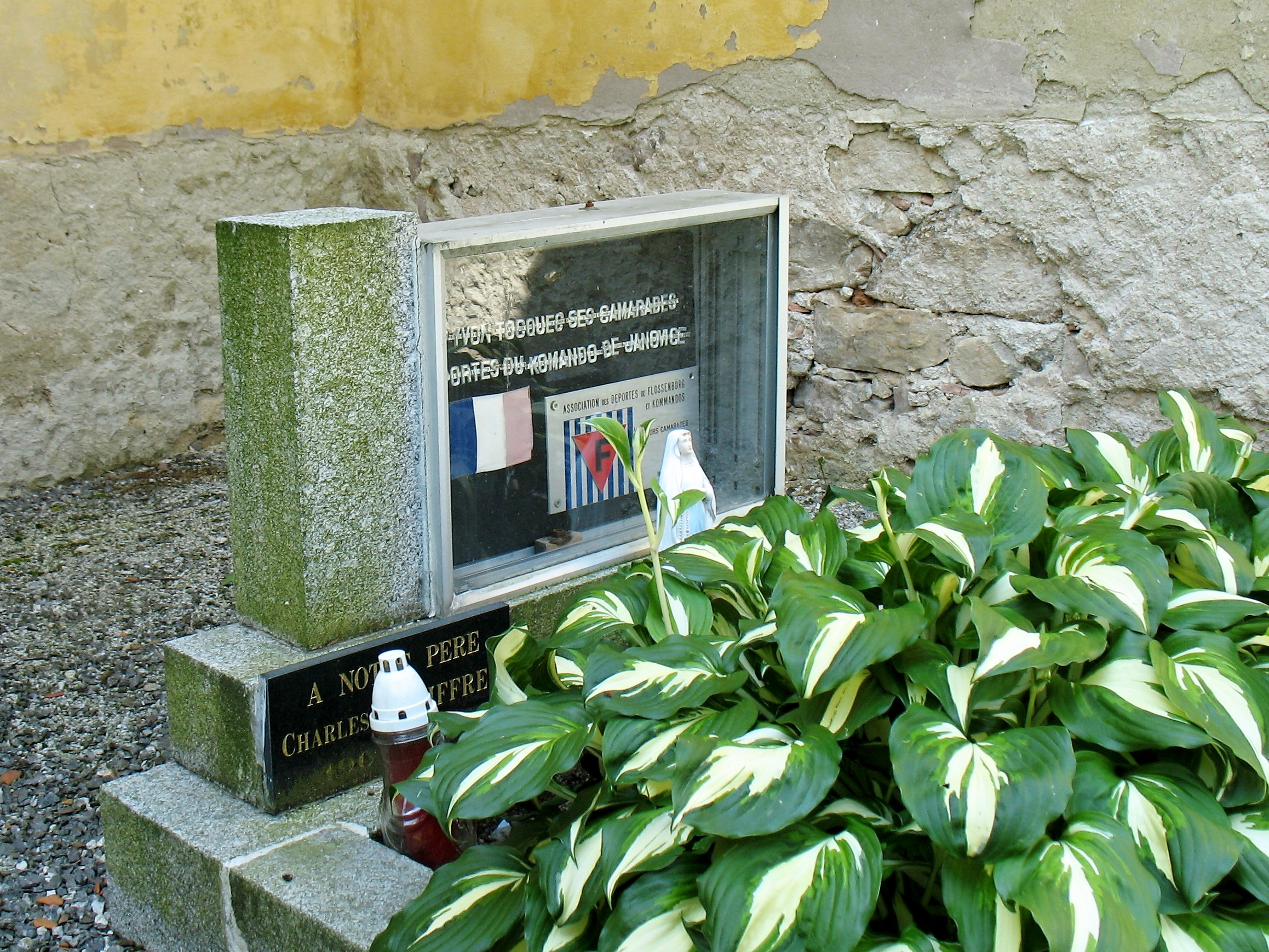
Memorial to French prisoners from the Flossenbürg subcamp at the cemetery by the Church of Saint Martin

Baroness Sidonie Nádherná of Borutín (1885–1950), who was born at the castle, became its last private owner. A patron of literature and art, she made the castle a meeting place for writers, artists, politicians and intellectuals including Rainer Maria Rilke, Karl Kraus, Max Švabinský, Karel Čapek, Adolf Loos, Viktor Stretti, Dora Pejačević, Camillo Karl Schneider and Mechtilde Lichnowsky.

During World War II, the Nazis confiscated the Nádherný estate and Vrchotovy Janovice was incorporated into the SS training area in Bohemia. Its inhabitants were displaced in the fifth and final phase of the area's evacuation, which ended on 1 April 1944. From July 1944, the market town housed a school for tank destroyers and assault guns. Three detention facilities were established: a punitive "education" camp for people who had fled forced-labour assignments in Germany; a camp for people of partial Jewish ancestry and men who refused to divorce their Jewish wives; and a political-prisoner subcamp of the Flossenbürg concentration camp.

The Flossenbürg subcamp began operating on 24 July 1944 and held about 200 male prisoners. Almost half were Russian, and more than 40 each were French and Polish. They were subjected to forced labour that included construction work, quarrying, unloading railway wagons and repairing roads. After a typhus epidemic, the prisoners were moved to a farm near Křepenice. Violent mistreatment and executions during the evacuation march caused numerous deaths. At the end of April 1945, the remaining prisoners were transported through Prague towards České Budějovice; the survivors were liberated by Czech partisans near Kaplice on 8 May. Since 1982, a memorial has stood at Nový rybník on the site of the guards' former dog kennel.

From 1961, the municipality of Rudoltice (including Hůrka, Libohošť and Manělovice) was merged with Vrchotovy Janovice. Velká Lhota and Šebáňovice (including Sedlečko) were annexed to Vrchotovy Janovice in 1971. Strnadice (today a part of Maršovice) was a municipal part of Vrchotovy Janovice from 1 September 1971 until 30 June 1990. The status of market town, which ceased to exist after World War II, was restored to the municipality on 22 June 2007.

== Demographics ==
Historical population

Year	Pop.	±%
1869	1,774	—
1880	1,826	+2.9%
1890	1,903	+4.2%
1900	1,814	−4.7%
1910	1,714	−5.5%

Year	Pop.	±%
1921	1,629	−5.0%
1930	1,566	−3.9%
1950	1,057	−32.5%
1961	1,044	−1.2%
1970	917	−12.2%

Year	Pop.	±%
1980	883	−3.7%
1991	877	−0.7%
2001	840	−4.2%
2011	973	+15.8%
2021	1,026	+5.4%

Source: Censuses

== Transport ==
The I/18 road (the section from Příbram to Votice) runs south of the market town.

Vrchotovy Janovice is located on the regional railway line Benešov–Sedlčany. Regional buses connects the market town with Benešov and Votice.

== Education ==
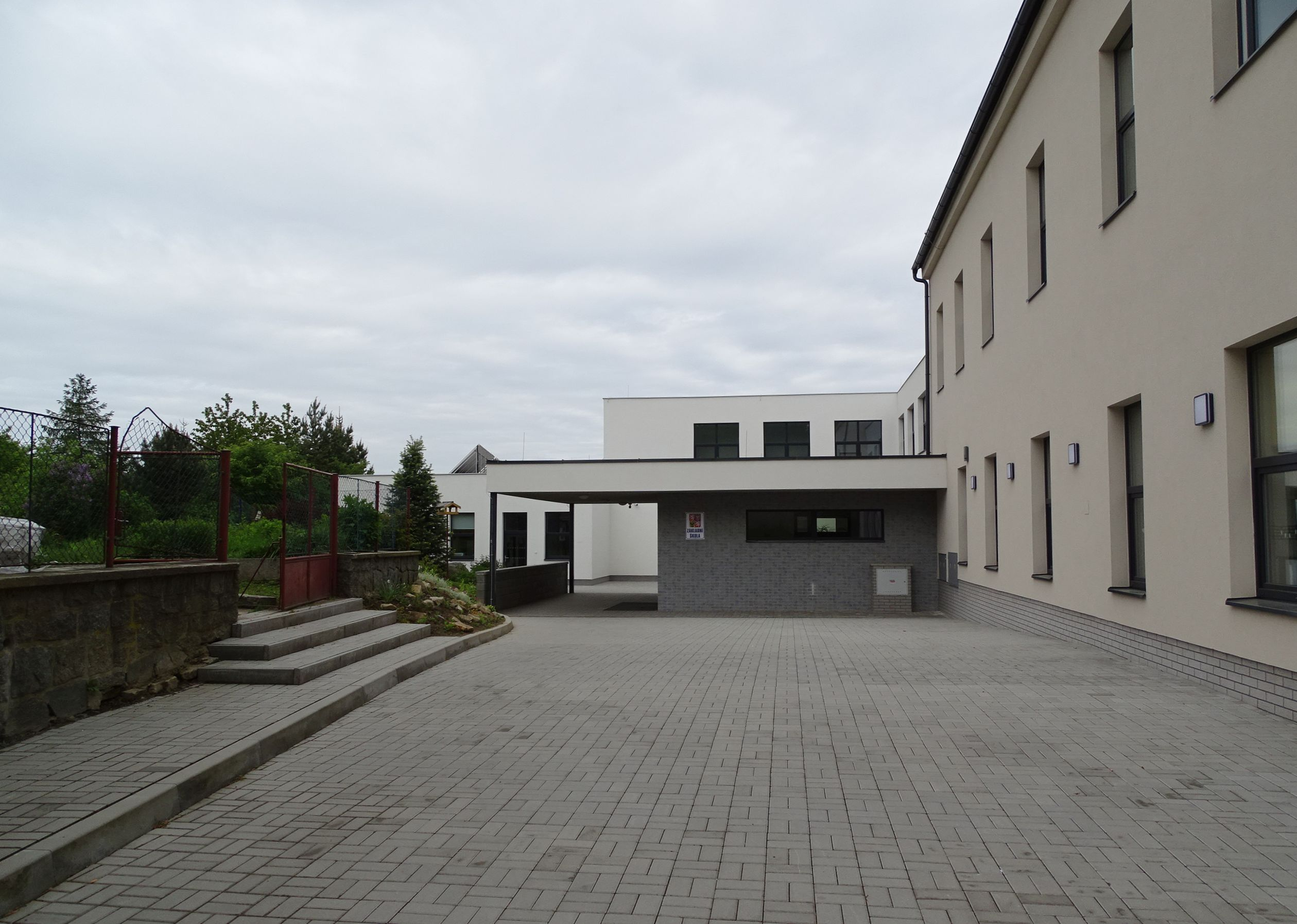
Primary school

The market town operates the combined Primary School and Kindergarten Vrchotovy Janovice.

== Sport ==
The local football club is TJ Sokol Vrchotovy Janovice. Its men's team competes in the lower amateur tiers. The club operates the municipally owned football ground, which has a natural-grass pitch.

== Sights ==
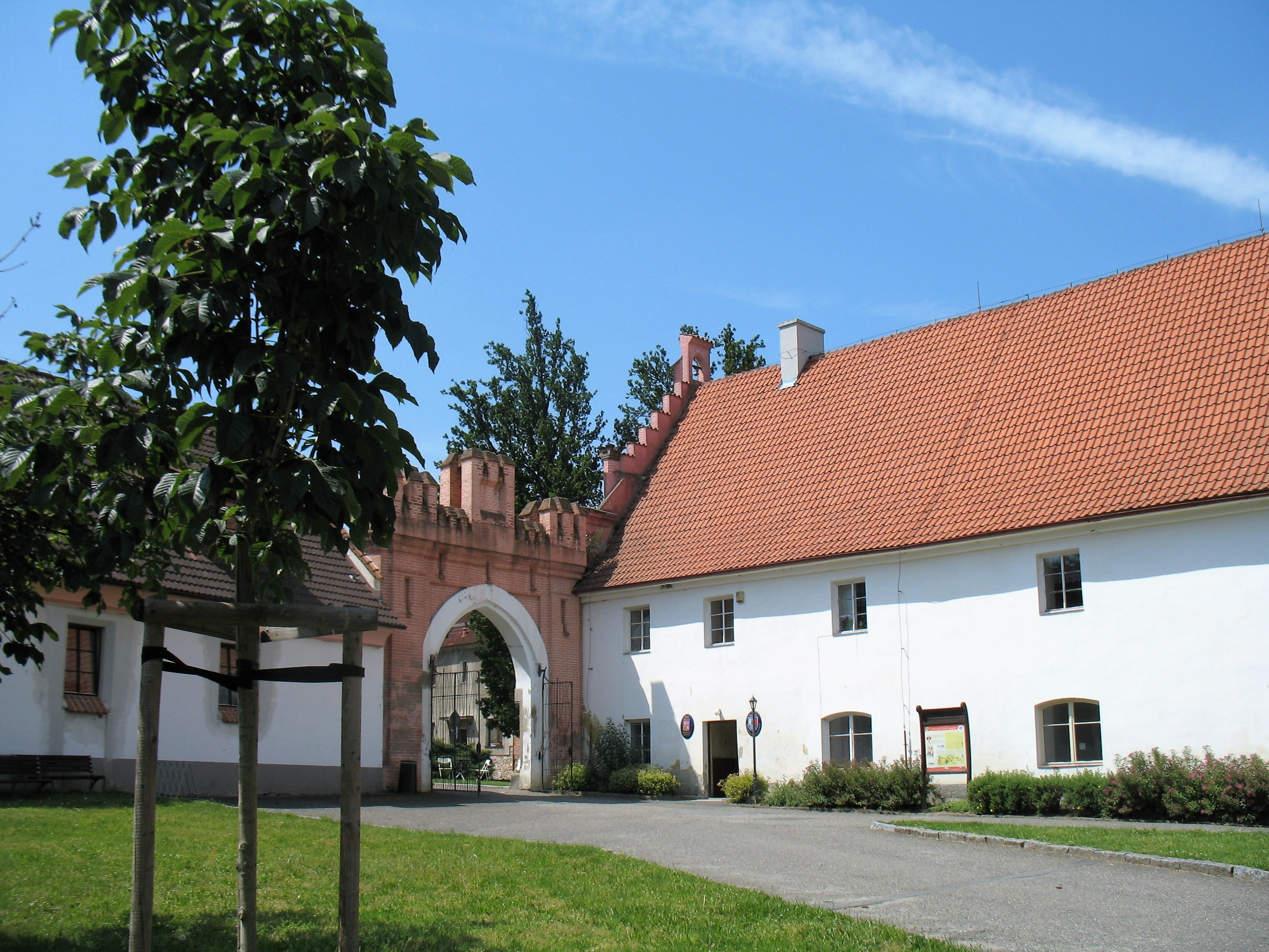
Gate to the castle and municipal office

=== Vrchotovy Janovice Castle ===
The main landmark of the market town is Vrchotovy Janovice Castle, surrounded by a 16.5-hectare (41-acre) landscape park. Founded around 1350 as a Gothic water fortress, it was rebuilt into a representative residence in 1579–1589. In 1750–1766, it was rebuilt in the late Baroque style. The castle acquired its present form with Neo-Gothic modifications during the reconstruction in 1857–1858. In 1949, the castle was expropriated and subsequently served as a textile warehouse and as a district archive. The National Museum acquired the castle in 1957 and has managed it since then. The castle houses permanent exhibitions on society in 19th-century Bohemia, the literary figures Rainer Maria Rilke and Karl Kraus and their relationship with Vrchotovy Janovice, and bellfounding in the Czech lands.

A formal ornamental garden was created in the late 1820s. The park incorporates a historic water system whose origins include the reservoir that supplied the medieval castle moat. In the 1880s, the garden was transformed into an English landscape park. Its present form was shaped further by the Nádherný family, supposedly particularly through their collaboration with the landscape architect and botanist Camillo Karl Schneider, and Count Herbert Schaffgotsch, who advised on alpine plants from 1929 to 1932. The family cemetery was established in the park in 1927. In the late 1930s and early 1940s, the park contained almost 800 species, cultivars and hybrids of herbaceous plants and nearly 500 woody taxa.

=== Other sights ===
Church of Saint Martin

Another notable landmark is the Church of Saint Martin. It was built in the Romanesque style at the end of the 12th century. In the 14th century, it was rebuilt in the Gothic style, and Neo-Gothic modifications were made in the 19th century. Notable surviving elements include a richly profiled Gothic portal, rib vaulting in the chancel and the original stone sanctuary. The protected complex also encompasses the cemetery wall, mortuary, stone crosses and historic gravestones.

Other cultural monuments in the market town are the rectory from the 1780s, a rural farmstead in Rudoltice from the first half of the 19th century, a Baroque statue of Saint John of Nepomuk in Hůrka and a stone two-arched road bridge from 1717.

The educational trail "In the Footsteps of Sidonie Nádherná" is an approximately 8.3 km (5.2 mi) long route with seven stops. It leads to neighbouring Olbramovice and presents Nádherná, members of her cultural circle, regional history and natural features.

== Notable people ==
- Sidonie Nádherná of Borutín (1885–1950), baroness
