= SS-Truppenübungsplatz Böhmen =

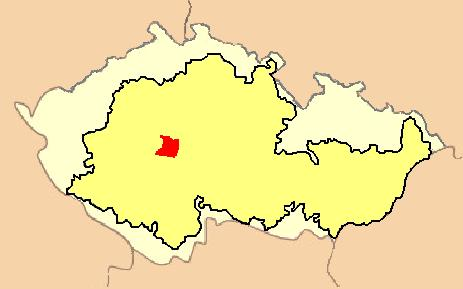
SS Military Area in Central Bohemia 1942–1945

SS-Truppenübungsplatz Böhmen was one of Waffen-SS training area in the territory of Protectorate of Bohemia and Moravia in time of World War II. It was established in 1941 and expanded between June 1942 and 1944, incorporating the castle and village of Janowitz, from which 30,000 civilians (including Baroness Sidonie Nádherná of Borutín) were cleared. The site grew to 44,000 hectares (110,000 acres) and was commanded from the town of Beneschau on its eastern edge. There was an officer cadet and non-commissioned officer school at Hradischko, an assault gun school at Janowitz as well as a training regiment and a number of pioneer battalions. In 1943 a sub camp of Flossenbürg concentration camp was established at Hradištko. Another subcamp at Janowitz housed around 200 prisoners were used for forced labour in the training grounds from July 1944, including to prepare the area as a defensive position. Many of the prisoners died from overwork, malnutrition, exposure and typhus.

Originally was called SS-Truppenübungsplatz Beneschau, because it was situated near the town of Benešov.

SS units from SS-Truppenübungsplatz Böhmen were used to form Kampfgruppe Wallenstein, which was used in the unsuccessful suppression of General Andrey Vlasov's Liberation army during Prague Uprising.
