= Ernesta Bittanti Battisti =

Italian journalist and educator

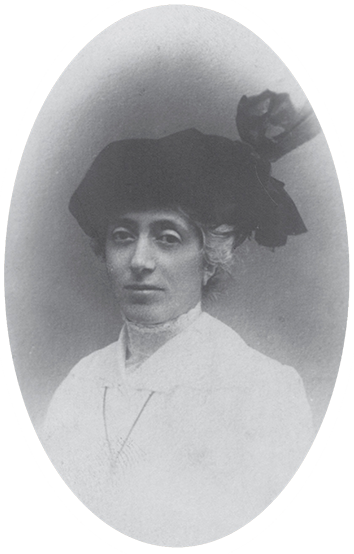
- Born: Ernesta Bittanti; 5 May 1871; Brescia, Italy
- Died: 5 October 1957 (aged 86); Trento, Italy
- Spouse: Cesare Battisti

Ernesta Bittanti Battisti (5 May 1871 – 5 October 1957) was an Italian journalist and educator.

The daughter of a school principal, she was born Ernesta Bittanti in Brescia and grew up there and in Cremona and Cagliari. She enrolled at the University of Florence in 1890. Her dwelling there became the center of a circle of intellectuals which included Gaetano Salvemini, Ugo Guido, Alfredo Galletti, Assunto Mori and Cesare Battisti. She graduated in 1896 and began teaching. However, in 1898, Battisti was banned from teaching because of her political activities. At the second congress of the Italian Socialist Party, she suggested that a socialist newspaper be created and the daily Il Popolo appeared in April 1900 with Battisti and her husband as editors. In March 1906, she began a campaign advocating divorce, which was in direct opposition to the views of the Catholic Church. In August 1914, the Il Popolo ceased publication and Battisti left Trento and returned to teaching.

In 1911, she wrote the lyrics to Inno al Trentino, a popular song in the province of Trentino, with music by Guglielmo Bussoli, who also recorded it in the same year. The song was suppressed by the Austrian authorities when it was first published.

She married Cesare Battisti in an 1899 civil marriage and moved to Trento. The couple had three sons. Her husband was executed by the Austro-Hungarian Army in July 1916. She took on the task of editing his political writings, which were published in 1923.

In 1930, she moved to Milan with her sons. She was opposed to the Fascist regime of Benito Mussolini and its racial laws which discriminated against Italian Jews. Following the Badoglio Proclamation in September 1943, the family fled to Lugano in Switzerland. They returned to Trento at the end of the war.

Battisti died in Trento at the age of 86 following an extended illness. She continued to write till the end.

Her son Gigino served in the Constituent Assembly of Italy and was mayor of Trento. He died in a rail accident in 1946.
