= Sidonie Nádherná of Borutín =

Czech noblewoman and salonnière

- Sidonie Nádherná z Borutína
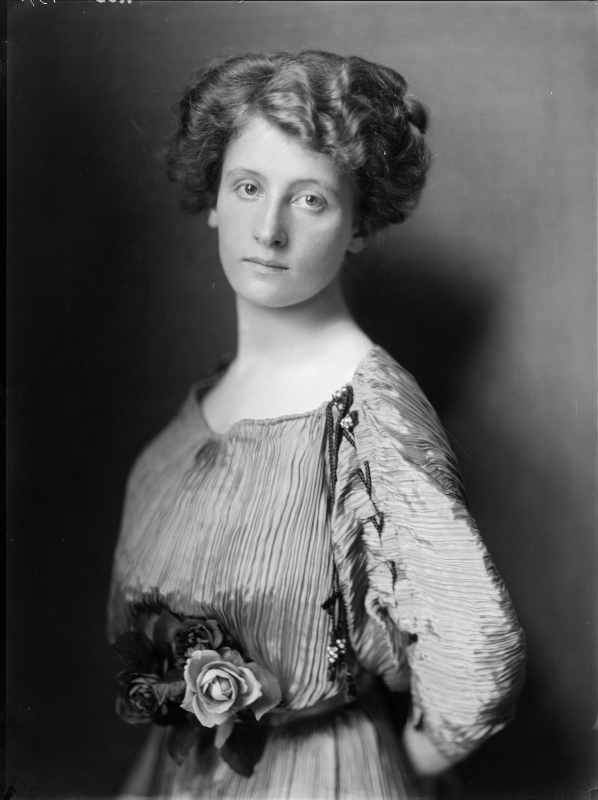
- Photo of Sidonie Nádherná von Borutín in 1910
- Born: Sidonie Amálie Vilemína Karolína Julie Marie Nádherná; 1 December 1885; Vrchotovy Janovice, Austria-Hungary
- Died: 30 September 1950 (aged 64); Middlesex, Great Britain
- Resting place: Vrchotovy Janovice, Czech Republic
- Occupations: Salon hostess, correspondent
- Spouse: Maximilian von Thun und Hohenstein (1920-1933)
- Partner: Karl Kraus
- Writing career
- Language: German

Baroness Sidonie Nádherná of Borutín, later Countess Sidonie von Thun und Hohenstein (Czech: Sidonie Nádherná z Borutína, German: Sidonie Nádherny von Borutin; 1 December 1885 – 30 September 1950) was a Czech noblewoman known for hosting literary salons and her correspondence with Rainer Maria Rilke and Karl Kraus.

== Early life and ancestry ==
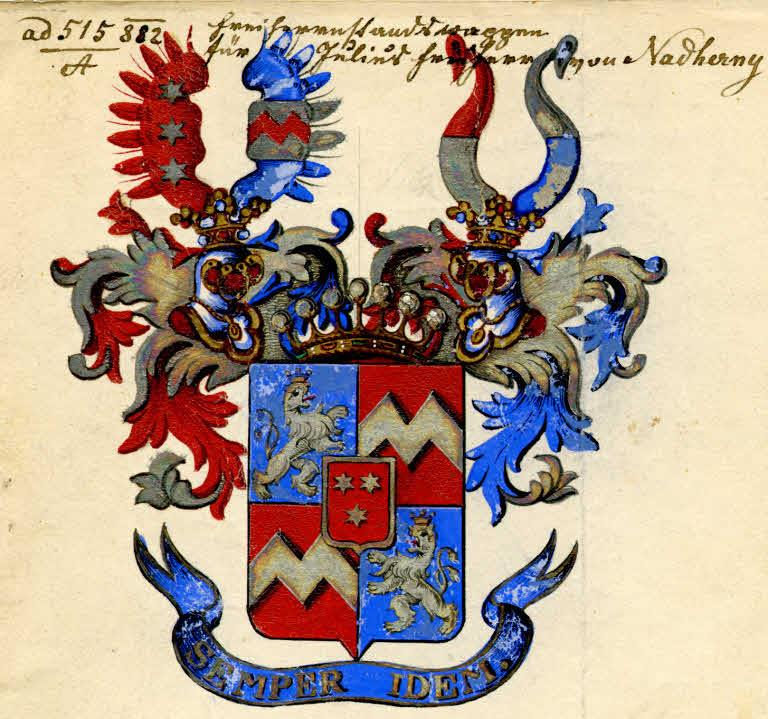
Coat of Arms of Barons Nadherný of Borutín (1882)

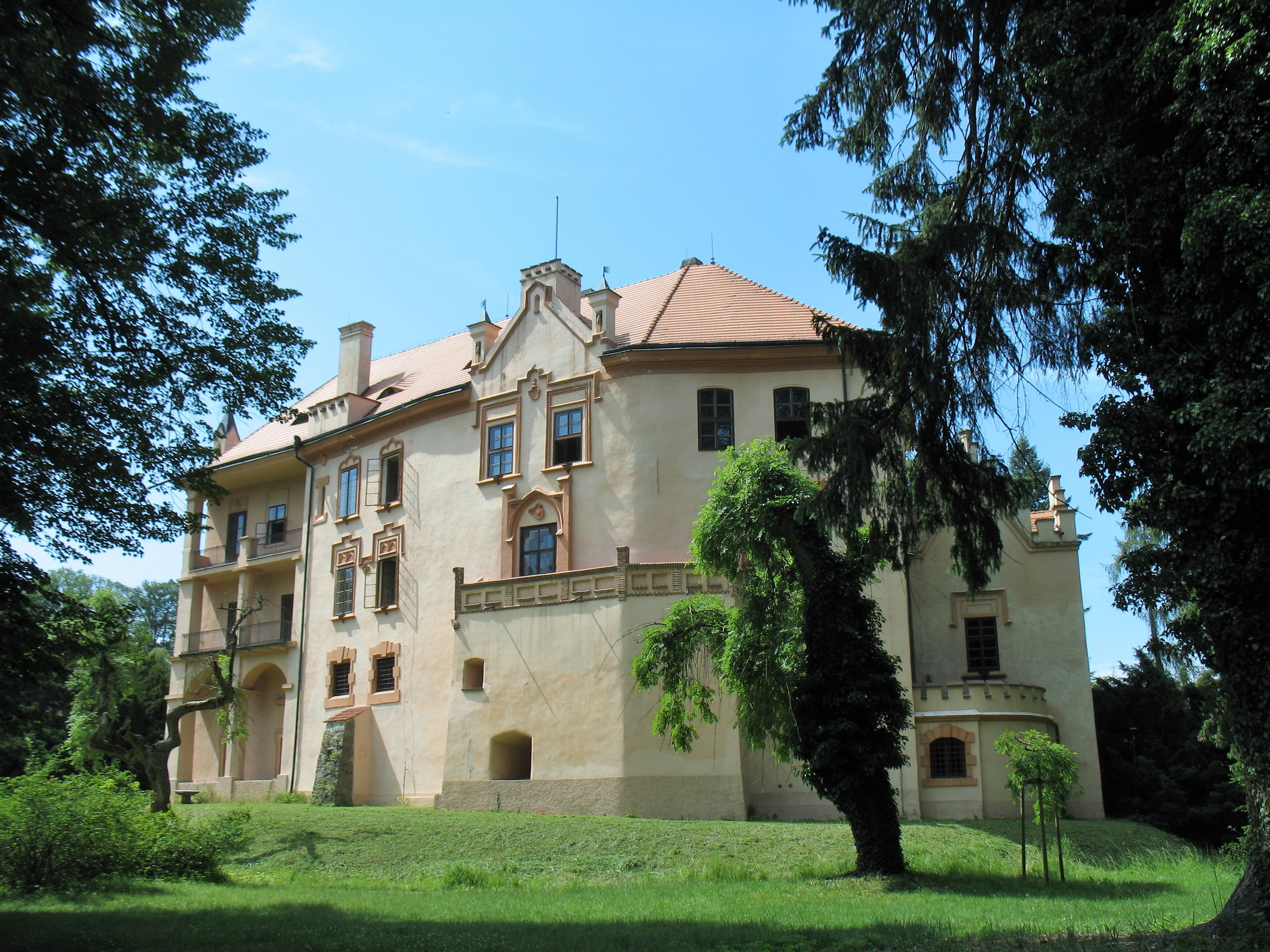
Vrchotovy Janovice Castle, her family residence

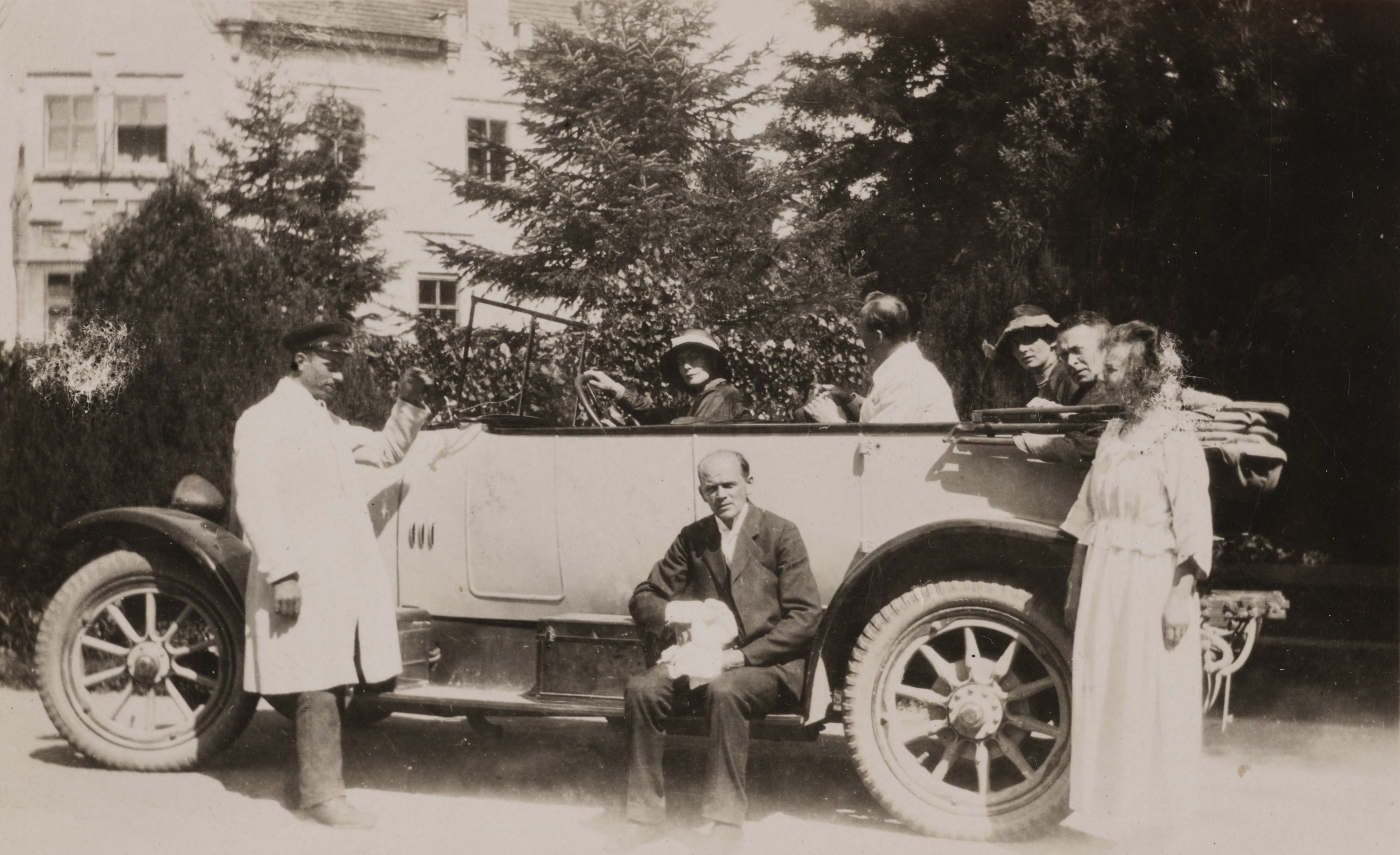
Sidonie with her brother, Karl Kraus and their friends in front of the Vrchotovy Janovice Castle (1920s)

Born at her family residence, a castle in Vrchotovy Janovice, into a family that belonged to the Bohemian nobility, Sidonie Amálie Vilemína Karolína Julie Marie Nádherná of Borutín was the youngest child of a landowner, Karel Boromejský Jan Ludvík Baron Nádherný of Borutín (1849–1895), and his wife, Baroness Amalie Klein von Wisenberg (1854–1910), youngest daughter of the Bohemian businessman of German origin Albert Baron Klein von Wisenberg (1807–1877).

Her older brothers were Jan Karel Ludvík Sidonius Adalbert Julius Otmar Maria (1884–1913) and Karel Maria Ludvík Hubert Adalbert Nádherný of Borutín (1885–1931).

== Biography ==
Nádherná gained literary fame through her friendship with the poet Rainer Maria Rilke, with whom she corresponded from 1906 until his death in 1926, and her friendship and later romantic relationship with the writer Karl Kraus. Nádherná met Kraus on 8 September 1913, in Vienna's Café Imperial. Their relationship, often filled with intensity and conflict, lasted until his death in 1936. Kraus would likely have married her, but Rilke objected to Kraus' "inextinguishable difference" (a reference to his Jewish heritage).

In 1914, Nádherná sought to make an influential marriage to a count that could have helped hinder World War I. She reconciled with Kraus in 1915, who wrote much of his drama The Last Days of Humanity at her residence, castle in Vrchotovy Janovice, but they separated again at the end of the war.

In 1920, Nádherná married the Austrian medical doctor, Count Maximilian von Thun und Hohenstein (1887–1935) at Heiligenkreuz Abbey, but the relationship did not last. They separated a year later, and divorced in 1933. Nádherná and Kraus reunited and split several more times, eventually reconciling one last time in 1927, although their relationship was no longer romantic.

Sidonie Nádherná's correspondence with Rilke and Kraus, now published, reveals her significance as a discussion partner, "creative listener," and as a representative of late Habsburg culture.

Nádherná is not solely defined by her relationships with influential men; she was also an independent and culturally invested woman. She organised many political and cultural salons at her family's estate near Prague.

In addition to Rilke and Kraus, her circle also included the architect Adolf Loos, the writer Karel Čapek, the composer Dora Pejačević, and the painter Max Švabinský.

In 1942, Vrchotovy Janovice Castle was seized by German troops and converted into the SS-Truppenübungsplatz Böhmen, training grounds for the Waffen-SS. After the war, Nádherná tried to reclaim her family's property, but was unsuccessful. The castle continued to be used by the army, and in 1948 was confiscated by the Communist Party of Czechoslovakia. Nádherná was briefly arrested before fleeing to Great Britain through Bavaria. She planned to move to Argentina. However, in 1950, she died of lung cancer as a result of being a heavy smoker.

In 1999, Nádherná's remains (which had been buried at St Mary's Church in Denham, Buckinghamshire and where a tombstone still remains) were brought back to Vrchotovy Janovice Castle and buried on the grounds. The castle and its surrounding lands were restored between 2000 and 2007, in a cooperative effort between the Czech Republic and Germany. Today it has become a cultural and scientific meeting place, much as it was during Nádherná's lifetime.
