= Camillo Karl Schneider =

German botanist and landscape architect (1876–1951)

- Born: 7 April 1876; Gröppendorf, German Empire
- Died: 5 January 1951 (aged 74); Berlin, Germany
- Occupations: Botanist, Landscape architect, Writer and Plant Collector.

Camillo Karl Schneider (7 April 1876 – 5 January 1951) was a German botanist and landscape architect. A farmer's son, he was born at Gröppendorf, in the Kingdom of Saxony, and worked as a gardener at Zeitz, Dresden, Berlin and Greifswald. Returning to Berlin to work in the City Parks Department, he assisted in editorial work for the periodical Gartenwelt, which led to his employ as a landscape assistant in Darmstadt and Berlin. In 1900, he moved to Vienna, where he practiced as a freelance architect and writer, travelling extensively through Europe. In 1904, he published his first books, including the beginning of his tome Illustrated Handbook of Broad-leaved Trees, which he completed in 1912. However, the manuscript of what should have been his magnum opus, a study of the genus Berberis, was destroyed in a bombing raid on Berlin in 1943. In 1907, he edited and distributed two exsiccata-like specimen series, namely Plantae hungaricae 1907 and Iter balcanicum 1907.

In 1913, supported by the Austro-Hungarian Dendrological Society, he ventured to China to collect plants and seeds for the botanical garden at Pruhonitz. He left China via Shanghai in 1915, travelling to Boston where he worked at the Arnold Arboretum alongside Sargent, Rehder and Wilson until 1919, when he returned to Vienna. Two years later, he moved to Berlin to work on the new periodical Gartenschönheit, which survived until 1942. From 1922 to 1932, Schneider advised the siblings Karel and Sidonie Nádherná on the development of the park at Vrchotovy Janovice Castle. On its demise, he worked for its successor, Gartenbau im Reich, although he also continued to practice as a landscape architect, redesigning gardens and parks in the new reich. Impoverished by the consequences of the war, he was obliged to continue working in old age; Schneider's last book Hecken im Garten (Hedges in the Garden) was published in 1950, the year before his death in Berlin.

His brother was Karl Camillo Schneider (born 28 August 1867 in Pomßen, Germany; † March 1943 in Oleśnica, Poland), who was a German-Austrian zoologist, philosopher, writer, parapsychologist and painter. He was in correspondence with Albert Einstein.

== Works ==
- Schneider, C. K. 1905. Illustriertes Handbuch der Laubholzkunde. Charakteristik der in Mitteleuropa heimischen im Freien angepflanzten angiospermen Gehölz-Arten und Formen mit Ausschluss der Bambuseen und Kakteen. Verlag von Gustav Fischer, Jena. Volume 1, pp 493–494 https://www.biodiversitylibrary.org/item/5886
- Schneider, C. K. 1905. Die Gattung "Berberis". Vorarbeiten für eine Monographie. // Bull.Herb.Boissier.Sér.2. Genève. Vol. v. p. 33 sq
