= Michael Furter =

Printer of incunabula in Basel

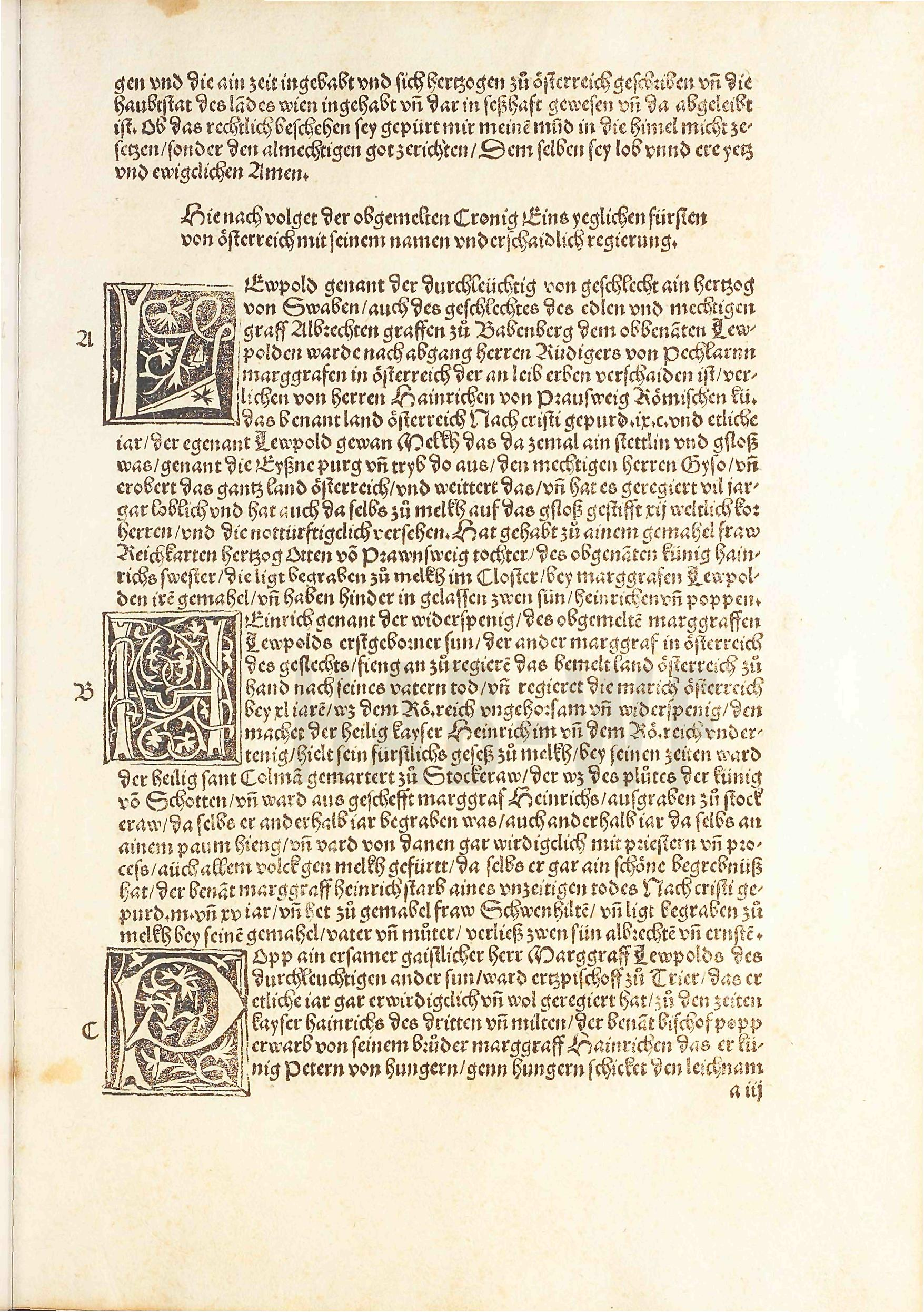
Page of the 1491 print of Ladislaus Sunthaym's genealogy of the House of Babenberg, with three initials: L for Leopold I, Margrave of Austria, H and P for his sons Henry and Poppo.

Michael Furter (died 1516 or 1517) was a printer of incunabula in Basel.

== Printing career ==
The first dated prints by Furter are from 1489. In 1494 he printed the Ship of Fools by Sebastian Brant for the publisher Jacob Bergmann von Olpe. Furter's workshop is notable for its illustrated prints and its large number of initial alphabets (Haebler, Typenrepertorium, 1905 lists twelve), including Etterlin's chronicle, Der Ritter vom Turm (Marquard vom Stein) and the Apocalypse of Pseudo-Methodius. In 1508 Furter and Gregor Schott jointly printed the third edition of the Margarita Philosophica by Gregor Reisch. Further also produced numerous popular works on grammar, jurisprudence, theology and morals. He was for a short while considered the first printer of Basel due to a typo in his prints and was the first to have depicted a coat of arms of Basel jointly with two Basilisks.

== Personal life ==
Furter is recorded as buying a house in Ryngasse, Lesser Basel on 1483. He was a member of the local "Trade Union to the Saffron". In 1491 he rented a shop for three and a half pound per year. He bought Basel citizenship for one gulden on 1 March 1488. In December 1500, he and his wife Ursula bought another house, called Zer Monen.

=== Death ===
He died between 10 November 1516 and 2 May 1517. He had a daughter and died without a male heir. He died indebted and following his death an inventory of his possessions was made. His possessions were then split between his debtors among which were Adam Petri and descendants of Johann Amerbach and the stepfather of Johann Froben among others.
