= Ernest II of Swabia =

Duke of Swabia from 1015 to 1030

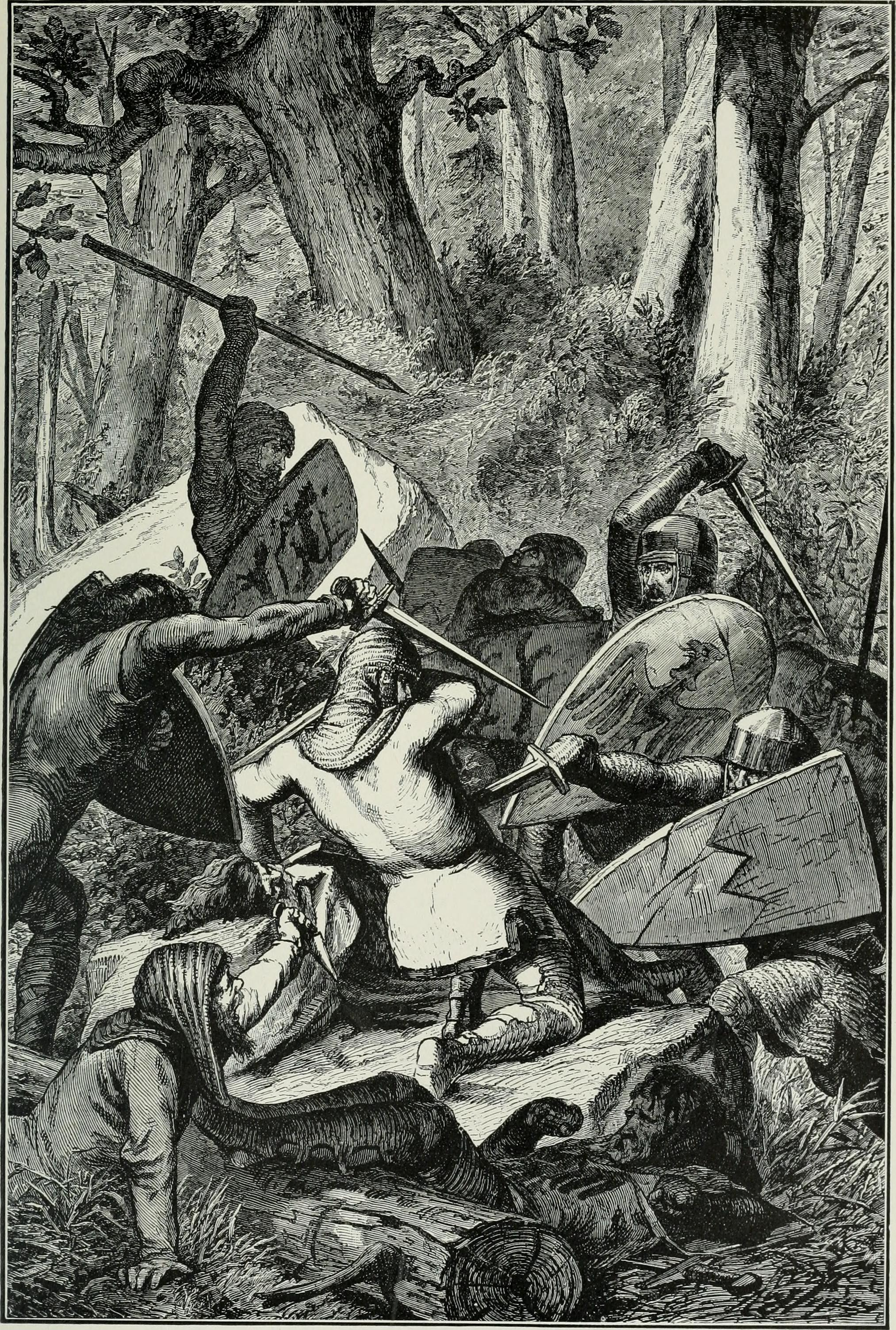
The death of Ernest of Swabia (19-th century illustration)

Ernest II (c. 1007 – 17 August 1030) was Duke of Swabia from 1015 to 1030. A member of the House of Babenberg, he was the son of Ernest I and Gisela of Swabia.

Ernest became duke following the senior Ernest's death in 1015. Since he was a minor, the duchy was governed by regency. At first his mother Gisela assumed the position of regent; she later gave way to Ernest's uncle Poppo, Archbishop of Trier.

In 1024 Gisela's husband Conrad, whom she had married in 1016, was elected King of Germany as Conrad II. Although Conrad was generous in his relations with Ernest, contentious issues soon split the duke and his stepfather. Ernest resented the power of the German Kings over Swabia. Both men also were potential claimants to the Kingdom of Burgundy once its childless ruler, Rudolph III, died. Gisela's mother was Gerberga, a sister of the king, and both Conrad and Ernest wished to become Rudolph's eventual successor.

In 1025 Ernest, who was still relatively young, entered into rebellion against Conrad. By 1026, however, Conrad had defeated the resistance and Ernest eventually submitted, gaining the abbey of Kempten as a fief. During Conrad's Italian expedition of 1026-1027, Ernest joined the opposition and rebelled against Conrad again. The refusal of the local Swabian rulers to support him caused his defeat. He was forced to surrender and was imprisoned. Gisela, despite supporting Conrad against her son, did not wish for him to be entirely humiliated; as a result Ernest remained duke, although Gisela probably governed the duchy while he remained imprisoned.

In 1028, Conrad's son Henry was crowned king, and Ernest was offered his duchy if he would give up his vassal Werner of Kyburg. At the Diet of Easter 1030 Ernest was again extended the offer, if he would crack down on the enemies of Conrad. Ernest's refusal to do so, especially against his friend Werner von Kyburg, resulted in his final downfall. He was deposed as duke and placed under imperial ban. A few months later, both Ernest and Werner were killed while battling troops of Count Manegold in the Black Forest. Ernest was buried at Konstanz Minster. The Duchy of Swabia passed to his younger brother Herman.

== Sources ==
- Robinson, Ian, ed. (2013). Eleventh-century Germany: The Swabian Chronicles. Manchester University Press.
- Weinfurter, Stefan (1999). The Salian Century: Main Currents in an Age of Transition. University of Pennsylvania Press.
- Wolfram, Herwig (2010). Conrad II, 990-1039: Emperor of Three Kingdoms. Pennsylvania State University Press.

Preceded by Ernest I	Duke of Swabia; 1015–1030	Succeeded by Herman IV
