= Richardis of Sualafeldgau =

Margravine of Austria from 976 to 994

- Margravine of Austria
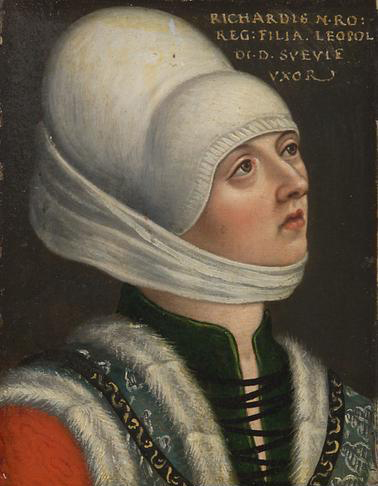
- Richardis by Anton Boys
- Born: Between 945 and 950
- Died: 8 July 994
- Buried: Melk Abbey
- Spouse: Leopold I, Margrave of Austria
- Issue: Henry I; Judith; Ernest I; Adalbert; Poppo; Kunigunda; Hemma; Christina
- Father: Ernst IV of Sualafeldgau or Erenfried II

Richardis of Sualafeldgau (Richwara; c. 945/950 – 8 July 994) was Margravine of Austria from 976 until 994 as consort of the first Babenberg margrave Leopold I.

== Life ==
Richardis' descent has not been conclusively established: she possibly was a daughter of the Franconian count Ernst IV of Sualafeldgau, or may have been a daughter of the Ezzonid count Erenfried II and his wife Richwara of Zülpichgau. She was probably also related to Adalbero of Eppenstein, Duke of Carinthia from 1011/12 to 1035.

Richardis married Leopold I (c. 940-994) on a date unknown. Her husband was appointed Margrave of Austria by Emperor Otto II on 21 July 976, after the deposition of Margrave Burkhard.

She died in 994, according to several obituaries on the same day her husband was killed in a tournament in Würzburg.

== Issue ==
- Henry I (died 1018), succeeded his father as Margrave
- Judith (Judita)
- Ernest I (died 1015), became Duke of Swabia in 1012
- Adalbert (985–1055), succeeded his elder brother Henry as Margrave
- Poppo (986–1047), Archbishop of Trier
- Kunigunda
- Hemma, married Count Rapoto of Dießen
- Christina, nun at Trier

== Sources ==
- Jackman, Donald C. (2008). Ius hereditarium Encountered III: Ezzo's Chess Match. Editions Enplage.
