= Austrians =

People of Austria

German: Österreicher

Total population
- c. 8–8.5 million

Regions with significant populations
- Austria 7,427,759 (Note: Citizens of Austria living there in 2018 according to official census data.)
- United States: 684,184
- Germany: 345,620
- Canada: 197,990
- Switzerland: 67,000
- Australia: 48,797
- United Kingdom: 39,600
- Turkey: 22,231
- France: 20,000
- Israel: 18,200
- Spain: 13,000
- Brazil: 12,500
- Argentina: 10,500
Other countries (1,000–10,000)
Netherlands	9,900
Italy	8,500
Czech Republic	5,000
Hungary	5,000
Sweden	4,500
Belgium	4,400
Egypt	3,200
Mexico	3,200
Romania	3,200
Norway	3,100
Serbia	3,000
United Arab Emirates	3,000
Liechtenstein	2,500
Poland	2,500
Portugal	1,700
Colombia	1,700
Chile	1,600
Denmark	1,600
Thailand	1,600
China	1,500
Croatia	1,500
New Zealand	1,500
Philippines	1,400
Dominican Republic	1,100
Luxembourg	1,000
South Korea	1,000

Languages
- German (Bavarian, Alemannic)

Religion
- Historically: primarily Roman Catholic minority Lutheran; Nowadays: Christian (68%); Irreligious and other (24%)

Austrians (German: Österreicher) are an ethnic group and nation native to Austria. The English term Austrians was applied to the population of Habsburg Austria from the 17th or 18th century. Subsequently, during the 19th century, it referred to the citizens of the Empire of Austria (1804–1867), and from 1867 until 1918 to the citizens of Cisleithania. In the closest sense, the term Austria originally referred to the historical March of Austria, corresponding roughly to the Vienna Basin in what is today Lower Austria.

Historically, Austrians were regarded as Germans and viewed themselves as such. The Austrian lands (including Bohemia) were part of the Holy Roman Empire and the German Confederation until the Austro-Prussian War in 1866 which resulted in Prussia expelling the Austrian Empire from the Confederation. Thus, when Germany was founded as a nation-state in 1871, Austria was not a part of it. In 1867, Austria was reformed into the Austro-Hungarian Empire. After the collapse of the Austro-Hungarian Empire in 1918 at the end of World War I, Austria was reduced to a rump state and adopted and briefly used the name the Republic of German-Austria (German: Republik Deutschösterreich) in an attempt for union with Germany, but was forbidden due to the Treaty of Saint-Germain-en-Laye (1919). The First Austrian Republic was founded in 1919. Nazi Germany annexed Austria with the Anschluss in 1938.

After the defeat of Nazi Germany and the end of World War II in Europe, both the political ideology of pan-Germanism and the union with Germany have become associated with Nazism, resulting in Austrians developing their own separate and distinct national identity. Today, the vast majority of Austrians do not identify as German.

== Name ==
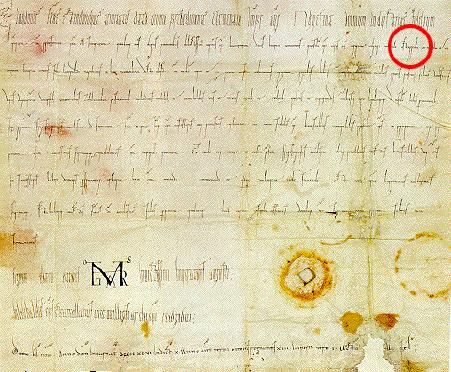
The first document containing the word "Ostarrîchi"; the word is marked with a red circle.

The English word Austrian is a derivative of the proper name Austria, which is a Latinization of Österreich, the German name for Austria. This word is derived from Ostarrîchi, which first appears in 996. This, in turn, is probably a translation of the Latin Marcha Orientalis, which means "eastern borderland" (viz. delimiting the eastern border of the Holy Roman Empire). It was a margraviate of the Duchy of Bavaria, ruled by the House of Babenberg from AD 976. During the 12th century, the Marcha Orientalis under the Babenbergs became independent of Bavaria. What is today known as Lower Austria corresponds to the Marcha Orientalis, while Upper Austria corresponds to the eastern half of the core territory of Bavaria (the western half forming part of the German state of Bavaria).

The adjective Austrian entered the English language in the early 17th century, at the time referring to Habsburg Austria in the sense of "members of the Austrian branch of the House of Habsburg" (the junior branch emerging from the dynastic split into Austrian and Spanish Habsburgs in 1521), but from the 18th century also "a native or inhabitant of Austria".

== History ==
=== Early history ===
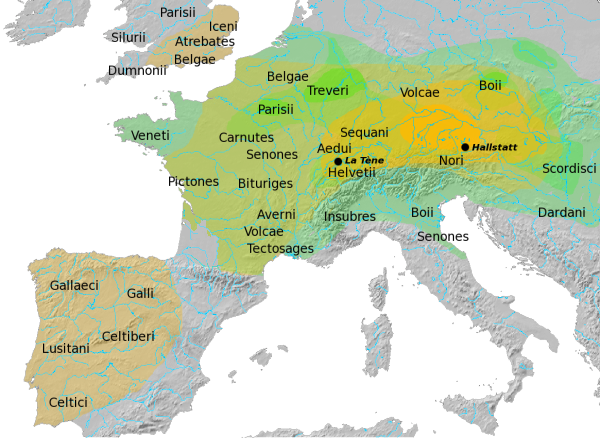
Overview of the Hallstatt and La Tène cultures: The core Hallstatt territory (HaC, 800 BC) is shown in solid yellow, The territories of some major Celtic tribes of the late La Tène period are labelled.

The territory of what is today Austria in the Roman era was divided into Raetia, Noricum, and Pannonia. Noricum was a Celtic kingdom, while the Pannonii were of Illyrian stock. The Raetians were an ancient alpine people, probably akin to the Etruscans. During the Migration period (c. 6th century), these territories were settled by the Bavarians and other Germanic groups in the west (Alemanni in Vorarlberg, Lombards in Tyrol), and by Slavic groups (principality Carantania) and Avars in the east. In the 8th century, the former territories of Raetia and Noricum fell under Carolingian rule, and were divided into the duchies of Swabia, Bavaria, and the principality Carantania. Pannonia, until the end of the 8th century, was part of the Avar Khaganate. The "East March" (Ostmark) during the 9th century was the boundary region separating East Francia from the Avars and the Magyars. The site of Vienna had been settled since Celtic times (as Vindobona), but the city only rose to importance in the High Middle Ages as the chief settlement of the March of Austria (the March river just east of Vienna marks the ancient border between Francia and the Avars).

After the defeat of the Magyars at the Battle of Lechfeld in 955, the East March or March of Austria came to be the easternmost portion of the Holy Roman Empire, bordering on Moravia to the north and on the Kingdom of Hungary to the east. As a consequence, the national character of the Austro-Bavarian speaking majority population of Austria throughout their early modern and modern history remained characterized by their neighbourhood to the West Slavs (Czechs, Slovaks) to the north, the South Slavs (Slovenes, Carinthian Slovenes, Burgenland Croats) to the south, and the Hungarians to the east.

The unification of the various territories of Austria outside of the March of Austria proper (i.e., parts of Bavaria, Swabia, and Carinthia) was a gradual process of feudal politics during the High and Late Middle Ages, at first in the Archduchy of Austria under the House of Babenberg during the 12th to 13th centuries, and under the House of Habsburg after 1278 and throughout the 14th and 15th centuries. The various populations of these territories were not unified under the single name of "Austrians" before the early modern period.

=== Early modern period ===
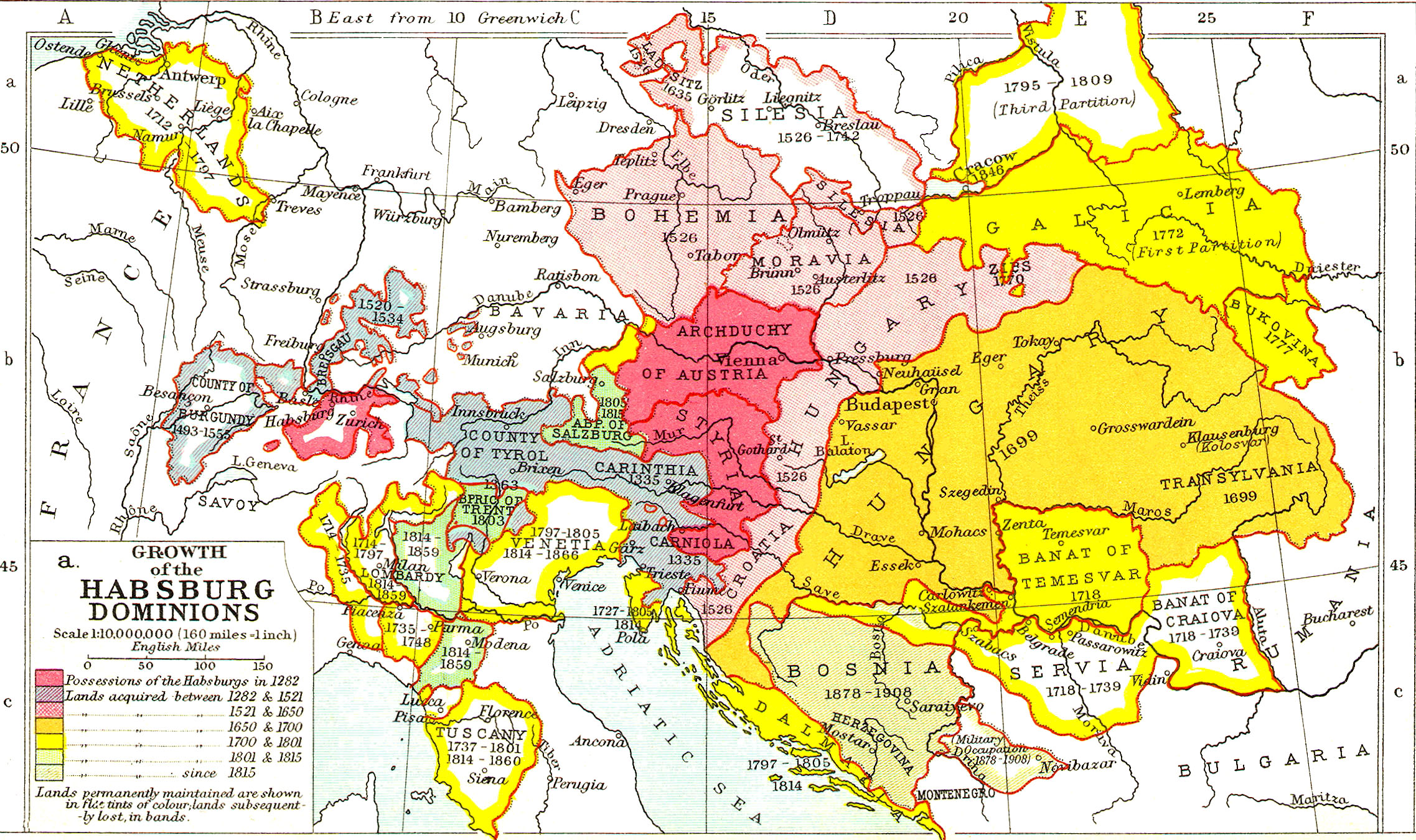
Growth of the Habsburg Monarchy

The Habsburg, who had ruled the territory of Austria since the Late Middle Ages, greatly increased their political prestige and power with the acquisition of the lands of the crowns of Hungary and Bohemia in 1526. The Hungarian aristocracy was more successful at retaining the Magyars' cultural and political preponderance in multi-ethnic Hungary than Bohemia, on three sides surrounded by German neighbours, which underwent a period of intense German colonisation, germanizing the leading classes of the Czech people as well. The common German identity of lands such as Carinthia, Styria, or Tyrol, and the ruling dynasty made it easier for these lands to accept the central government set up in Vienna in the mid-18th century.

The term Austrian in these times was used for identifying subjects of the Domus Austriae, the House of Austria, as the dynasty was called in Europe, regardless of their ethnic ancestry. Although not formally a united state, the lands ruled by the Habsburgs would sometimes be known by the name "Austria". In reality, they remained a disparate range of semi-autonomous states, most of which were part of the complex network of states that was the Holy Roman Empire (the imperial institutions of which were themselves controlled for much of their later existence by the Habsburgs). However, the second half of the 18th century saw an increasingly centralised state begin to develop under the reign of Maria Theresa of Austria and her son Joseph II.

After the French Revolution and the rise of Napoleon, the emperor Franz II formally founded the Austrian Empire in 1804 and became, as Franz I the first Austrian emperor. For the first time, the citizens of the various territories were now subjects of the same state, while most of the German states, Prussia excluded, still cultivated their Kleinstaaterei and did not succeed in forming a homogenous empire. Following Prussia's victory in the Austro-Prussian War in 1866, Otto von Bismarck successfully unified the German Empire in 1871, which was Prussian-dominated, without the inclusion of Austria and the German Austrians.

After Austria was excluded from Germany in 1866, the following year, Austria joined Hungary as a dual empire known as the Austro-Hungarian Empire. A further major change resulted from a reorganisation of the Austrian Empire in 1867 into a dual monarchy, acknowledging the Kingdom of Hungary as an independent state bound to the remaining part of the empire, as well independent, by a personal and real union, the Emperor of Austria being the Apostolic King of Hungary (with both titles on the same level). The Austrian half, a patchwork of crown-lands, broadly coterminous with the modern-day Austria, the Czech Republic, and parts of Slovenia, Poland, Ukraine, Italy, and Croatia, was bound together by the common constitution of 1867, stating that all subjects now would carry "uniform Austrian citizenship" and have the same fundamental rights. These non-Hungarian lands were not officially called the Austrian Empire. Until 1915, they were officially called "the Kingdoms and States Represented in the Imperial Council" and politicians used the technical term Cisleithania (labelling the Hungarian lands as Transleithania). The general public called them Austria, and in 1915, the non-parliamentary Cisleithanian government decreed to use this term officially, too.

=== 19th-century nationalism ===
Central Europe (c. 1820) showing the Kingdom of Prussia (blue), the Austrian Empire (yellow), and other independent German states (grey). The red line marks the border of the German Confederation; both Prussia and Austria controlled lands outside the Confederation.

The idea of grouping all Germans into one nation-state gave way to a rapid rise of German nationalism within the German Confederation, especially in the two most powerful German states, Austria and Prussia. The question of how a unified Germany was to be formed was a matter of debate. The German Question was to be solved by either unifying all German-speaking peoples under one state as the "Greater German solution" (Großdeutsche Lösung), which was promoted by the Austrian Empire and its supporters. On the other hand, the "Lesser German solution" (Kleindeutsche Lösung) advocated only to unify the northern German states and exclude Austria; this proposal was favored by the Kingdom of Prussia and its supporters. This debate became known as German dualism.

The lands later called Cisleithania (except Galicia and Dalmatia) were members of the German Confederation since 1815, as they had been part of the Holy Roman Empire until 1806. Until 1848, Austria and its chancellor, Prince Metternich, unanimously dominated the confederation. The developing sense of a German nationality had been accelerated massively as a consequence of the political turmoil and wars that engulfed Central Europe following the French Revolution and the rise to power of Napoleon Bonaparte. Although the years of peace after Napoleon's fall quickly saw German nationalism largely pushed out of the public political arena by reactionary absolutism, the Revolutions of 1848 established it as a significant political issue for a period of nearly a hundred years.

A map of the German Confederation in 1849 showing the 39 independent states

Political debate now centred on the nature of a possible future German state to replace the Confederation, and part of that debate concerned the issue of whether or not the Austrian lands had a place in the German polity. When Emperor Franz Joseph I ordered to build a monument in Vienna in 1860 to Archduke Charles, victor over Napoleon in the Battle of Aspern-Essling in 1809, it carried the dedication "To the persistent fighter for Germany's honour", to underline the German mission of the House of Austria.

The idea of uniting all ethnic Germans into one nation-state began to be challenged in Austria by the rise of Austrian nationalism, especially within the Christian Social Party that identified Austrians based on their predominantly Catholic religious identity as opposed to the predominantly Protestant religious identity of the Prussians.

Habsburg influence over the German Confederation, which was strongest in the southern member states, was rivalled by the increasingly powerful Prussian state. Political manoeuvering by the Prussian chancellor Otto von Bismarck resulted in the military defeat of the Austrians in the Austro-Prussian War of 1866 and the collapse of the Confederation, both effectively ending any future Austrian influence on German political events.

When asked by Edward VII to abandon Austria-Hungary's alliance with Germany for co-operation with England, Franz Joseph replied "I am a German prince."

The Franco-Prussian War and the establishment of a German Empire in 1871, headed by Prussia and pointedly excluding any of the Austrian lands, led the state to turn away from Germany and turn its gaze towards the Balkan Peninsula. Thereby, the influence of pan-Germanism was diminished in the Habsburg territories, but as the term "Austrians" still was used supra-national, German-speaking Austrians considered themselves Germans (and were counted as such in the censuses). After Bismarck had excluded Austria from Germany, many Austrians faced a dilemma about their identity, which prompted the Social Democratic Leader Otto Bauer to state that the dilemma was "the conflict between our Austrian and German character." The state as a whole tried to work out a sense of a distinctively Austrian identity.

The Austro-Hungarian Empire created ethnic conflict between the German Austrians and the other ethnic groups of the empire. Many pan-German movements in the empire desired the reinforcement of an ethnic German identity, and that the empire would collapse and allow for a quick annexation of Austria to Germany. Although it was precisely because of Bismarck's policies that Austria and the German Austrians were excluded from Germany, many Austrian pan-Germans idolized him.

While the high bureaucracy of Austria and many Austrian army officers considered themselves "black-yellow" (the Habsburg colours), i.e., loyal to the dynasty, the term "German Austria" (Deutschösterreich) was a term used in the press to mean all the Austrian districts with an ethnic German majority among the inhabitants. Austrian pan-Germans such as Georg Ritter von Schönerer and his followers agitated against the "multi-national" Austro-Hungarian Empire and advocated for German Austria to join the German Empire. Although many Austrians shared the same views, a lot of them still showed allegiance to the Habsburg monarchy and hoped for Austria to remain an independent country. Although not as radical as Schönerer and his followers, populists such as Karl Lueger used anti-semitism and pan-Germanism as a form of populism to further their own political purposes.

=== First Austrian Republic ===
Provinces claimed by German Austria, with the subsequent border of the First Austrian Republic outlined in red

The last year of World War I saw the collapse of Habsburg authority throughout an increasingly greater part of its empire. On October 16, 1918, Emperor Karl I invited the nations of Austria to create national councils, to instigate a restructuring of the state under Habsburg rule. The nations followed the invitation (the Czechs had founded their national council already before the invitation), but ignored the will of the emperor to keep them in a restructured Austrian state. Their goal was total independence.

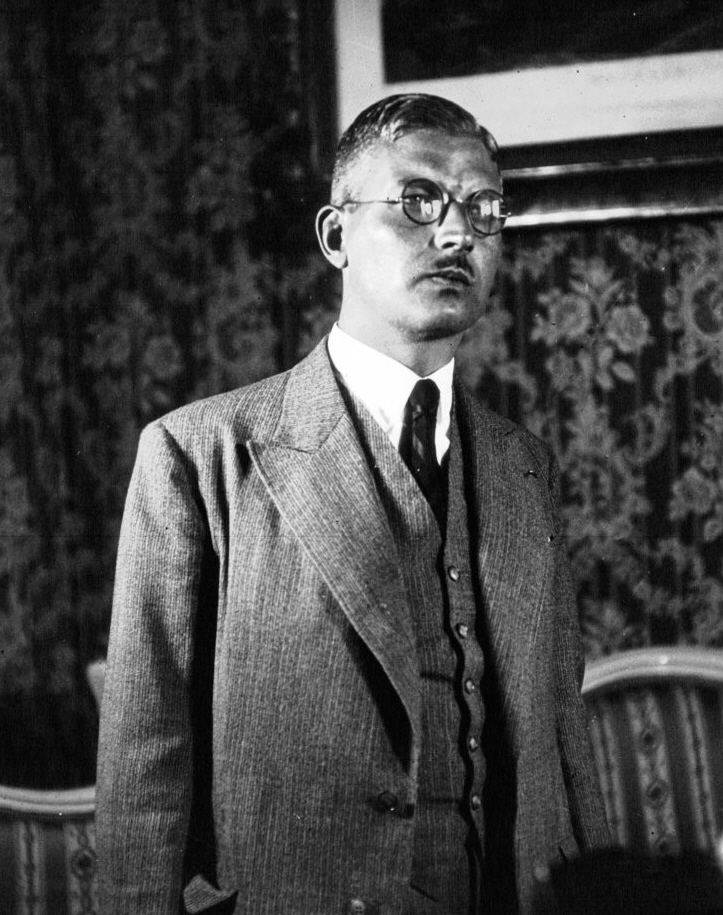
Chancellor Kurt Schuschnigg

On October 21, the German members of the Austrian parliament, elected in 1911, met in Vienna to found the Provisional National Assembly of German Austria ("Provisorische Nationalversammlung für Deutschösterreich"). On October 30, 1918, they installed the first German Austrian government, leaving the question "monarchy or republic" open. (German nationalists and social democrats favoured the republic, the Christian Socialists wanted to keep the monarchy.) This government, in the first days of November, took over the duties of the last imperial-royal government in a peaceful way. Initially, the new state adopted the name "German Austria", reflecting the republic being the German part of the old Austria and showing the popular desire to unite with the new German republic. On November 12, 1918, the provisional national assembly voted for the republic and for unification with Germany with a large majority.

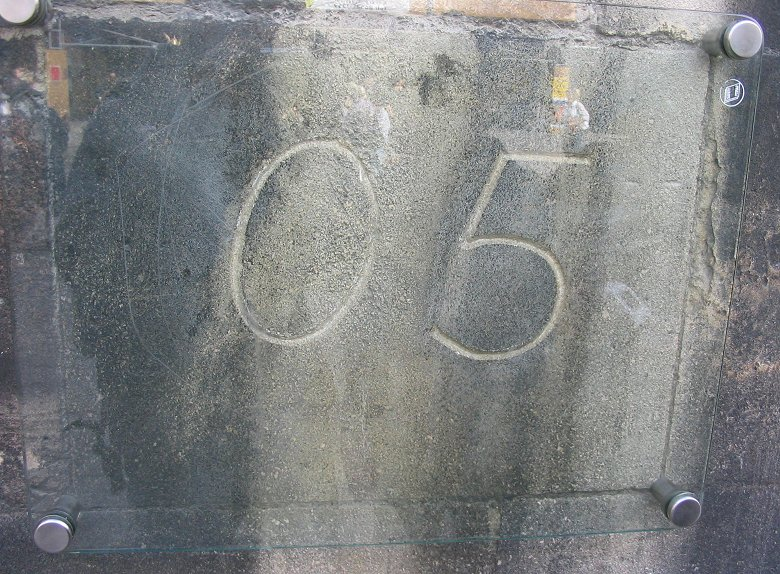
Sign of the Austrian resistance movement at the Stephansdom in Vienna

The creation of the Czechoslovak and South Slav states, the dissolution of the real union with Hungary, and the post-war treaties imposed by the victorious Allies combined to see the newly established Austrian republic both with the boundaries it has today, and a largely homogeneous German-speaking population. In the Treaty of Saint-Germain, in September 1919, the union with Germany was prohibited, and the new republic's name "Deutschösterreich" was prohibited by the treaty; instead, the term "Republic of Austria" was used. The westernmost province Vorarlberg's wish to unite with Switzerland was also ignored. On October 21, 1919, the state changed its name accordingly. Many German Austrian communities were left scattered throughout the other new states, especially in Czechoslovakia, where more than 3 million German Bohemians had not been allowed to become part of the new Austrian state, as well as in the southern part of Tyrol, which now found itself part of Italy. In total, more than 3.5 million German-speaking Austrians were forced to remain outside the Austrian state.

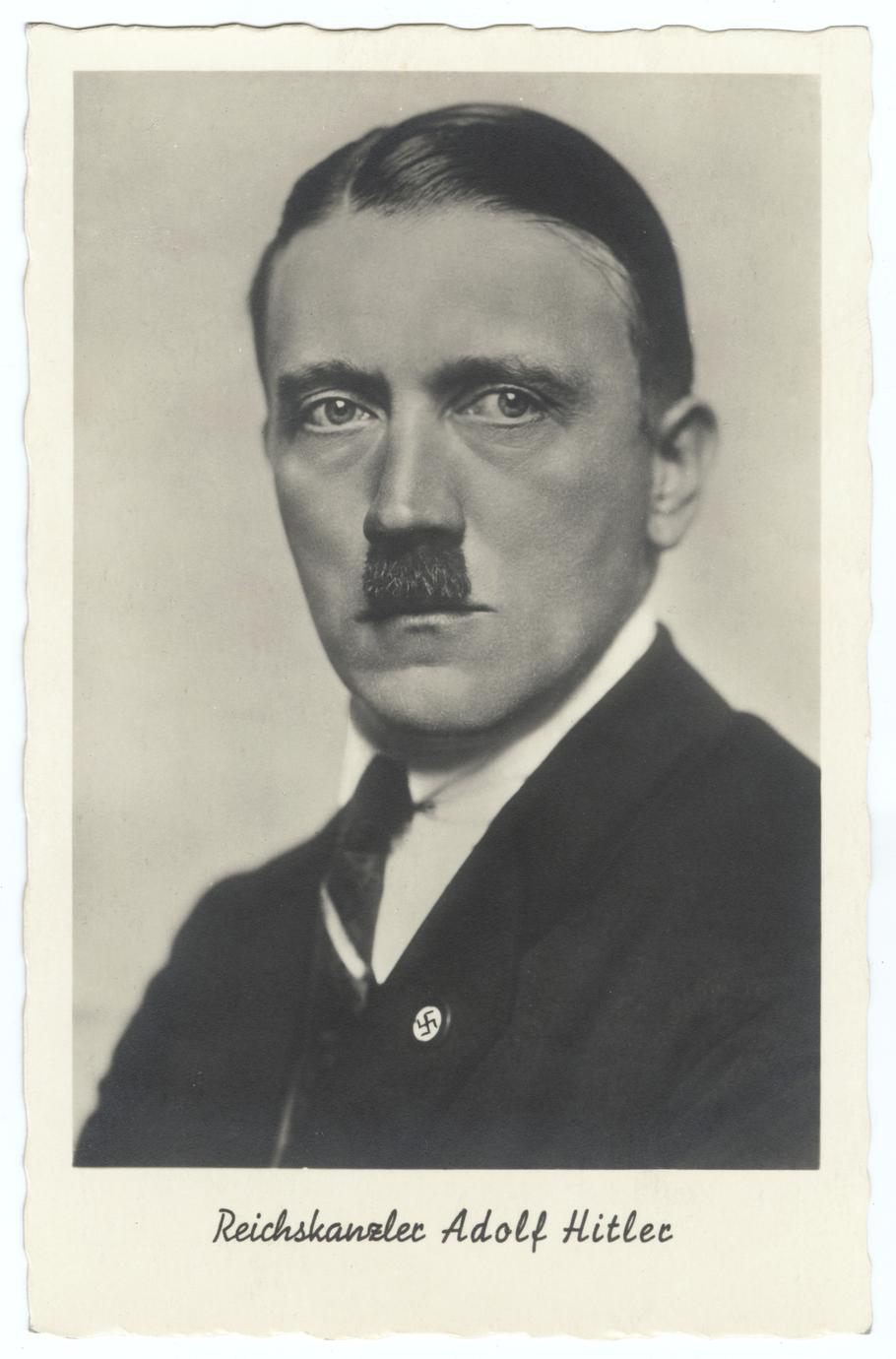
Adolf Hitler was an Austrian German by birth who was known as the Führer in Germany and annexed his birth country, Austria, to Germany in 1938 during the Anschluss.

The collapse of the empire caused an apparent struggle for some German Austrians between an "Austrian" and a "German" character. The idea of unifying Austria with Germany was motivated both by a sense of a common German national identity, and also by a fear that the new state, stripped of its one-time imperial possessions, and surrounded by potentially hostile nation-states, would not be economically viable. An Austrian identity emerged to some degree during the First Republic, and although Austria was still considered part of the "German nation" by most, Austrian patriotism was encouraged by the anti-Nazi/anti-Socialist clerico-authoritarianist state ideology known as Austrofascism from 1934 to 1938. The Engelbert Dollfuss/Kurt von Schuschnigg government accepted that Austria was a "German state" and believed Austrians were "better Germans", but strongly opposed the annexing of Austria to Nazi Germany.

=== Under Nazi Germany ===
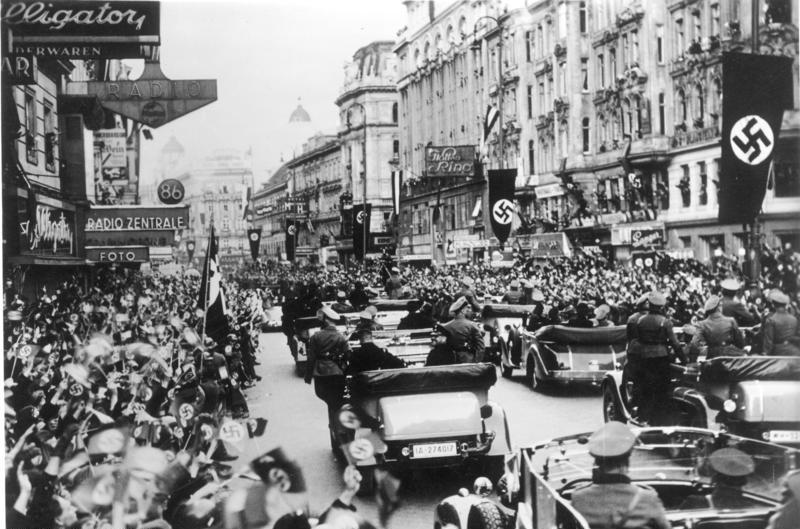
Austrians greeting the Nazis during the Anschluss in Vienna

By March 1938, with Nazi government in control of both Berlin and Vienna, the country was annexed to Germany (Anschluss) as Ostmark. The total number of Jewish Austrian Holocaust victims was 65,000. About 140,000 Jewish Austrians had fled from the country in 1938–39. Thousands of Austrians had taken part in serious Nazi crimes (hundreds of thousands of people died in the Mauthausen-Gusen concentration camp alone), a fact which was officially acknowledged by Chancellor Franz Vranitzky in 1992. Some of the most prominent Nazis were native Austrians, including Adolf Hitler, Ernst Kaltenbrunner, Arthur Seyss-Inquart, Franz Stangl, Otto Skorzeny, and Odilo Globocnik, as were 40% of the staff at Nazi extermination camps. Romani people were also racially targeted in Austria by the Nazis.

The total number of Austrian military deaths from 1939 to 1945 was 260,000.

The Austrian resistance to the Nazi rule started with the Anschluss in 1938. Historians estimate that there were about 100,000 members of the resistance facing 700,000 NSDAP members in Austria.

=== Second Austrian Republic ===
Karl Renner and Adolf Schärf (Socialist Party of Austria [Social Democrats and Revolutionary Socialists]), Leopold Kunschak (Austria's People's Party [former Christian Social People's Party]), and Johann Koplenig (Communist Party of Austria) declared Austria's secession from the Third Reich by the Declaration of Independence on 27 April 1945 and set up a provisional government in Vienna under state Chancellor Renner the same day, with the approval of the victorious Red Army and backed by Joseph Stalin. (The date is officially named the birthday of the second republic.) At the end of April, most of western and southern Austria was still under Nazi rule. On 1 May 1945, the Federal Constitutional Law of 1920, which had been terminated by dictator Dollfuss on 1 May 1934, was declared valid again. Though the Allied Powers treated Austria as a belligerent party in the war and maintained occupation of it after the Nazi capitulation, they accepted the Declaration of Independence and made the first national elections possible in the autumn of that year. By the end of 1945, Austria, under the supervision of the Allied Council in Vienna, had a democratic parliament and government again, acknowledged by all four Allied occupation zones.

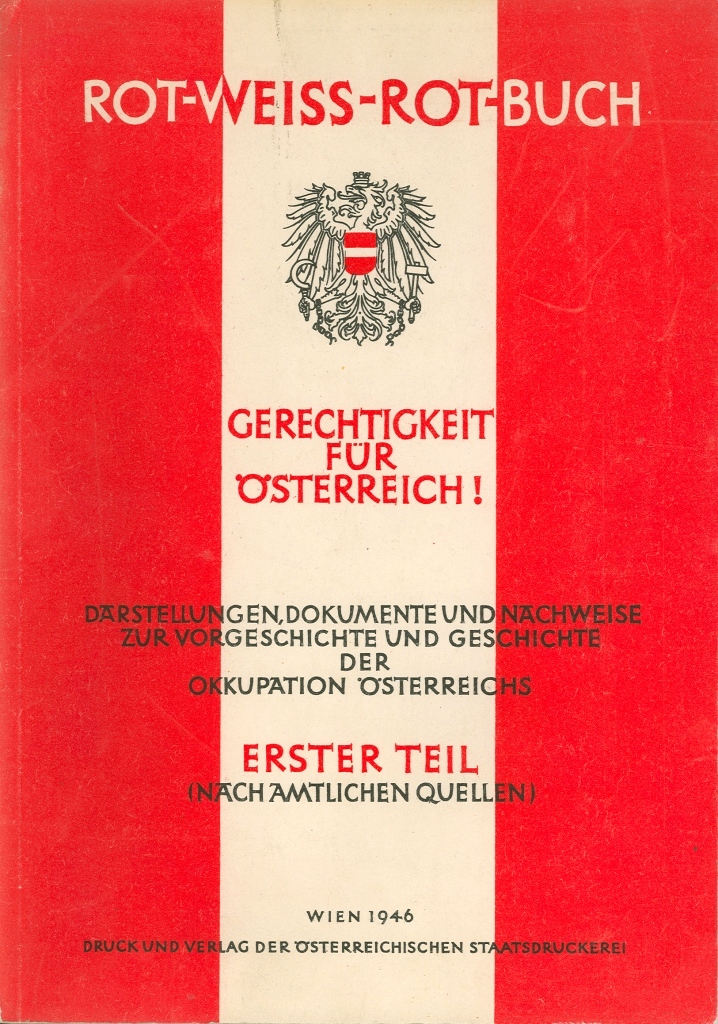
"Red-White-Red Book" which was published by the Austrian Ministry of Foreign Affairs in 1946. The book describes the accepted version of the events during the Anschluss (1938-1945) by the founders of the Second Austrian Republic.

Allied occupation ended in 1955, when the Austrian State Treaty between Austria and the Allies was signed.

Immediately after 1945, the majority of Austrians still saw themselves as Germans, as a broader Austrian national identity took time to develop. In a 1956 survey, 46% of Austrians still considered themselves to be Germans. Another survey carried out in 1964 revealed that only 15% of Austrians still considered themselves to be Germans.

In contrast, the Austrian political elite referred to their experiences in concentration camps and in prison, which had brought out a desire for the lost independence of the Austrian state. Kreissler (1993) writes: "It was not until after the (long dark) night of the Third Reich that Austrian identity was brought back to consciousness by resistance and exile". Austrians developed a self-image unambiguously separate from their German neighbour. It was based on cultural achievements of the past, the Moscow Declaration, geopolitical neutrality, language variation, the Habsburg legacy, and the separation of the two empires in the late 19th century. The German Empire was formed without Austria and the Austro-Hungarian Empire in the arrangement known as the Kleindeutsche Lösung or "the Little Germany Solution". It proved favourable for Austrians not to be held guilty for World War II, genocide, and war crimes, since Austria was considered a victim of Nazi Germany, although some historians call this a "big lie" and have challenged this statement.

Unlike earlier in the 20th century, in 1987 only 6% of Austrians identified themselves as "Germans". Today, over 90% of the Austrians see themselves as an independent nation. The logic of the existence of an independent Austrian state is no longer questioned as it was in the inter-war period. Proponents who recognize Austrians as a nation claim that Austrians have Celtic heritage, as Austria is the location of the first characteristically Celtic culture to exist. It is said that Celtic Austria became culturally Romanized under Roman rule and later culturally Germanized after Germanic invasions. Contemporary Austrians express pride in having Celtic heritage, and Austria possesses one of the largest collections of Celtic artifacts in Europe.

Austria's multicultural history and geographical location have resulted in post-Soviet era immigration from Slovenia, the Czech Republic, Hungary, Slovakia, Romania, and Poland. As with neighbouring Germany, there has also been heavy immigration from Turkey and former Yugoslav states such as Croatia and Serbia.

== Language ==
Austrians have historically spoken the German language. The sole official language at the federal level of Austria is German, and the standard used is called Austrian German since German is considered a pluricentric language, like English. Austrian German is defined by the Austrian Dictionary (German: Österreichisches Wörterbuch), published under the authority of the Austrian Federal Ministry of Education, Arts and Culture. Thus, all websites, official announcements, and most of the media are carried out in Austrian German. In terms of native language, it is generally not Austrian German that is used, but instead local dialects of the Austro-Bavarian and Allemannic (in Vorarlberg and the Tiroler Außerfern) family. The Austro-Bavarian dialects are considered to belong either to the Central Austro-Bavarian or Southern Austro-Bavarian subgroups, with the latter encompassing the languages of the Tyrol, Carinthia, and Styria and the former including the dialects of Vienna, Burgenland, Upper Austria, and Lower Austria. The vast majority of Austrians are, however, able to speak Austrian Standard German in addition to their native dialect and English, as it is taught in all schools.

The minority languages Slovene, Croatian, and Hungarian are spoken and officially recognized by some states of Austria.

== Naturalization ==
Like most of Central Europe, Austria has had high levels of immigration since the 1970s. As with Germany, the largest immigrant group is Turks. An estimated total of 350,000 ethnic Turks lived in Austria in 2010, accounting for 3% of the Austrian population.

The rate of naturalization has increased after 1995, since which date Turks in Austria could retain their citizenship in Turkey after naturalization in Austria (dual citizenship). After 2007, the rate of naturalizations has decreased due to a stricter nationality law enacted by the Austrian legislature. During the 2000s, an average of 27,127 foreign nationals per year were naturalized as Austrian citizens, compared to an average of 67,688 children per year born with Austrian nationality.

Today, the largest group of foreign nationals are Germans. As of January 2018, 186,891 Germans lived in Austria.

== Culture ==
=== Music ===
Vienna, the capital city of Austria, has long been an important center of musical innovation. Composers of the 18th and 19th centuries were drawn to the city by the patronage of the Habsburgs, and made Vienna the European capital of classical music. Wolfgang Amadeus Mozart, Franz Schubert, and Johann Strauss, Jr., among others, were associated with the city. During the Baroque period, Slavic and Hungarian folk forms influenced Austrian music.

=== Literature ===
Complementing its status as a land of artists, Austria has always been a country of great poets, writers, and novelists. It was the home of novelists Arthur Schnitzler, Stefan Zweig, Thomas Bernhard, and Robert Musil, and of poets Georg Trakl, Franz Werfel, Franz Grillparzer, Rainer Maria Rilke, and Adalbert Stifter. Famous contemporary Austrian playwrights and novelists include Elfriede Jelinek and Peter Handke. Writers of philosophy include Ernst Mach, Ludwig Wittgenstein, Karl Popper and the members of the Vienna circle.

=== Cuisine ===
Austrian cuisine, which is often incorrectly equated with Viennese cuisine, is derived from the cuisine of the Austro-Hungarian Empire. In addition to native regional traditions it has been influenced above all by German, Hungarian, Czech, Jewish, Italian and Polish cuisines, from which both dishes and methods of food preparation have often been borrowed. Goulash is one example of this. Austrian cuisine is known primarily in the rest of the world for its pastries and sweets.

=== Religion ===
The majority of Austrians are traditionally Catholic. Catholicism in Austria has played a significant role both in the culture and in the politics of Austria. It enabled the House of Habsburg to rule Spain and its empire as a Catholic Monarchy from the 16th century, and it determined the role of Habsburg Austria in the Thirty Years' War. The music in the tradition of Viennese classicism is sacral to a significant extent, including works such as Wolfgang Amadeus Mozart's Great Mass in C minor, Joseph Haydn's masses (1750-1802), Ludwig van Beethoven's Mass in C major (1807), down to Anton Bruckner's Te Deum (1903).

Secularism has been on the rise since the 1980s. An estimated 66% of Austrians adhered to Roman Catholicism in 2009, compared to 78% in 1991 and 89% in 1961. There is a traditional Lutheran minority, accounting for 4% of the population in 2009 (down from 6% in 1961). An estimated 17% are nonreligious (as of 2005).

Islam in Austria has grown rapidly during the 1990s and 2000s, rising from 0.8% in 1971 to an estimated 6% in 2010, overtaking the traditional size of the Lutheran community in Austria. This rapid growth was due to the significant immigration to Austria from Turkey and Yugoslavia during the 1990s to 2000s.

== See also ==
- Demographics of Austria
- Austrian American
- Austrian Brazilian
- Austrian Canadians
- Austrian Mexicans
- Austro-Bavarian
- German nationalism in Austria
- Pan-Germanism
- List of Austrians
- Studentenverbindung
- Austrian culture
- Austrian cuisine
- Austria-Germany relations
