= Adalbert, Margrave of Austria =

Margrave of Austria from 1018 to 1055

Adalbert
- Margrave of Austria
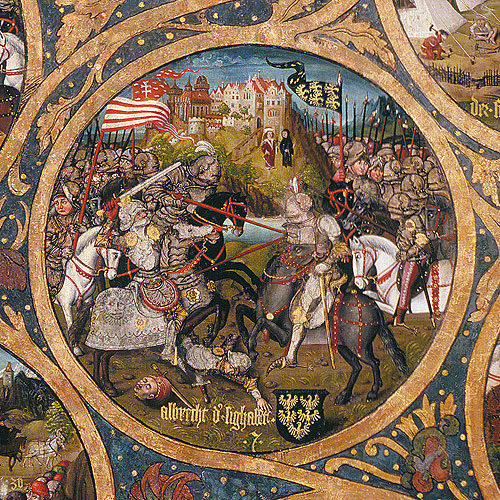
- Adalbert the Victorious with Archbishop Poppo of Trier watching, Babenberger Stammbaum, Klosterneuburg Monastery, 1489–1492
- Margrave: 1018–1055
- Predecessor: Henry I
- Successor: Ernest
- Born: c. 985
- Died: 26 May 1055; Melk, Austria
- Family: House of Babenberg
- Spouses: Glismod of West-Saxony; Frozza Orseolo
- Issue: Ernest
- Father: Leopold I
- Mother: Richardis of Sualafeldgau

Adalbert (German: Albrecht, c. 985 – 26 May 1055), known as Adalbert the Victorious (German: Albrecht der Siegreiche), was the Margrave of Austria from 1018 until his death in 1055. He was a member of the House of Babenberg.

== Biography ==
Adalbert the Victorious was the third son of Leopold the Illustrious and Richardis of Sualafeldgau. He succeeded as Margrave upon the death of his older brother, Henry I, Margrave of Austria.

As margrave, he extended the eastern border of the then small Ostmark of Bavaria as far as the rivers Morava and Leitha. He took part in the German–Hungarian War in the summer of 1030. He supported King Henry III in his battles against Hungary and Bohemia. He resided in the Lower Austrian Babenberg castle of Melk, where Melk Abbey was to develop later.

== Marriage and family ==
Adalbert married first Glismod of West-Saxony. They had no known children.

He married second Frozza Orseolo, who later took the name of Adelheid. She was the sister of Peter Urseolo of Hungary. Frozza and Adalbert had two sons:

- Leopold (died 9 December, 1043), Margrave of the Hungarian March.
- Ernest, who became Margrave of Austria.

== Death ==
Adalbert died on 26 May 1055 at Melk.

== See also ==
- List of rulers of Austria

Adalbert, Margrave of Austria House of Babenberg Born: c. 985 Died: 26 May 1055
Preceded by Henry I	Margrave of Austria; 1018–1055	Succeeded by Ernest
