= Ernest I =

Ernest I or Ernst I can refer to:

- Ernest I, Duke of Swabia (reigned 1012–15)
- Ernest I, Prince of Anhalt-Dessau (died 1516)
- Ernest I, Duke of Brunswick-Lüneburg (1497–1546), Ernest the Confessor
- Ernst I, Duke of Saxe-Coburg-Altenburg (1601–1675), Ernest the Pious
- Ernst I, Duke of Saxe-Coburg and Gotha (1784–1844), father of Prince Albert, the consort of Queen Victoria
- Ernst I, Prince of Hohenlohe-Langenburg (1794–1860)
- Ernest Augustus I, Duke of Saxe-Weimar-Eisenach (1688–1748)
- Ernest Frederick I, Duke of Saxe-Hildburghausen (1681–1724)
- Ernest Günther I, Duke of Schleswig-Holstein-Sonderburg-Augustenburg (1609–1689)
- Ernst Ludwig I, Duke of Saxe-Meiningen (1672–1724)
