= Leopold I, Margrave of Austria =

Margrave of Austria from 976 to 994

Leopold I
- Margrave of Austria
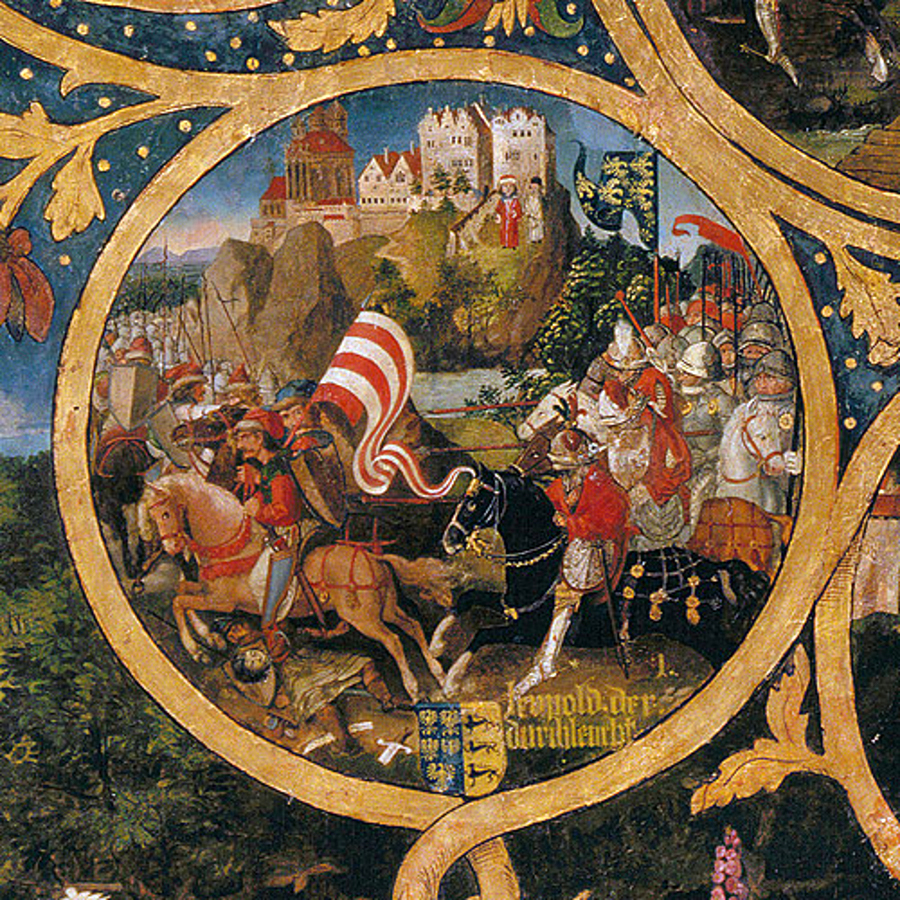
- Leopold the Illustrious fighting the Magyars and defending Melk, Babenberger Stammbaum, Klosterneuburg Monastery, 1489–1492
- Margrave: 976–994
- Predecessor: Burkhard
- Successor: Henry I
- Born: c. 940
- Died: 10 July 994; Würzburg, Franconia
- Buried: Melk Abbey
- Family: House of Babenberg
- Spouse: Richardis of Sualafeldgau
- Issue: Henry I; Judith; Ernest I; Adalbert; Poppo; Kunigunda; Hemma; Christina
- Father: (?) Arnulf, Duke of Bavaria

Leopold I (also Luitpold; c. 940 – 10 July 994), known as the Illustrious (German: der Erlauchte) founder of medieval Austria was a member of the House of Babenberg who ruled as Margrave of Austria from 976 until his death. He was the first margrave of the Babenberg dynasty which ruled the March and Duchy of Austria until its extinction in 1246.

== Biography ==
The origins of Leopold the Illustrious are not known. According to some sources, his father Berthold was count in the Nordgau, the region north of Ratisbon (Regensburg) in the Duchy of Bavaria. A more recent theory identifies Leopold as a younger son of Duke Arnulf of Bavaria and brother (or nephew) of Count Berthold of Schweinfurt. While his ancestry remains disputed, a descent from the Popponids (Elder House of Babenberg) is assumed and some affiliation with the ducal Luitpoldings dynasty is probable.

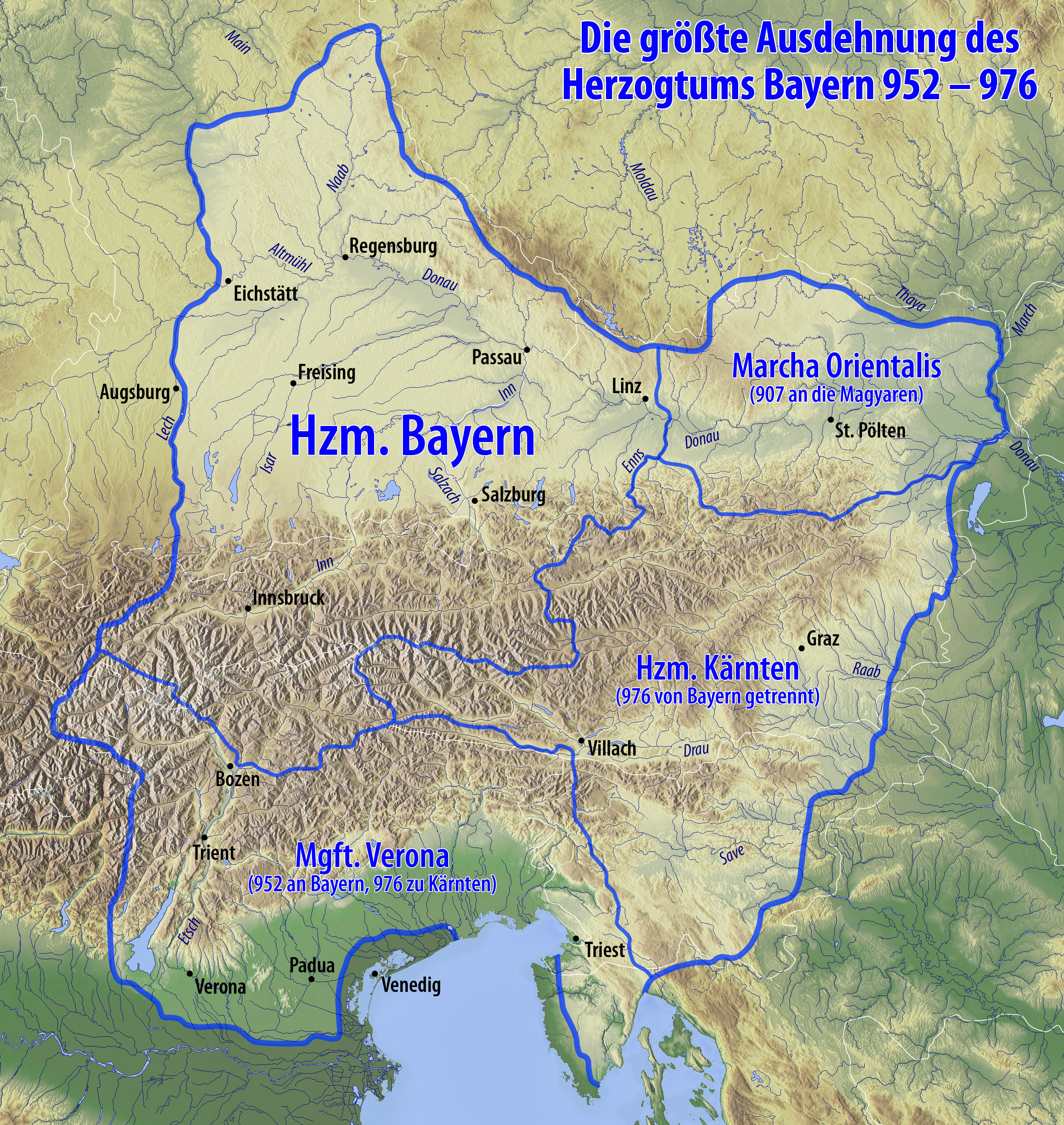
Bavaria with the marches of Austria, Carinthia and Verona, 952–976

Leopold is first mentioned in a document issued by Emperor Otto I on 13 February 962 as Liupo, count of the Bavarian Donaugau region near Ratisbon, count of the Traungau region, and a faithful follower of the Emperor. After Otto I had defeated the Magyars in the 955 Battle of Lechfeld, he re-established the Bavarian Marcha orientalis (Eastern March) in the conquered territories, placing them under the command of Margrave Burkhard, a brother-in-law of Duchess Judith, consort of Duke Henry II of Bavaria. When Burkhard joined the uprising of Duke Henry II ("the Wrangler") against Emperor Otto II, he was deposed at the Imperial Diet of Ratisbon in 976. According to a charter dated 21 July 976, loyal Leopold was appointed margrave of the Marcha orientalis, the core territory of the later Archduchy of Austria.

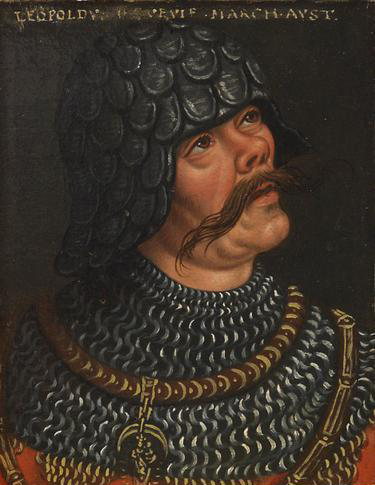
Leopold I of Babenberg

The resettlement of the east was a slow process that centered from the fortress of Pöchlarn down the Danube river. Leopold's margraviate originally coincided with the present-day Wachau valley, and whose eastern boundary was the Traisen river near Sankt Pölten east of Krems. With the Magyar threat largely reduced following their defeat in 955, Leopold focused on securing his holdings from internal threats and dissensions. In 984, he engaged in the reduction of the fortress at Melk, which was still controlled by supporters of the late margrave. Once Melk was secured, Leopold most likely used it as his residence, founding a monastery there for twelve secular priests. By 987, Leopold extended the boundary of his margraviate to the east as far as the Wienerwald mountain range and by 991, jointly with reinstated Duke Henry II of Bavaria, further down to the Fischa river.

In 994, Leopold travelled to Würzburg to mediate a dispute between his cousin Margrave Henry of Schweinfurt and the Würzburg bishop Bernward von Rothenburg, one of whose knights Henry had seized and blinded. At a tournament held on 8 July, Leopold was hit in the eye by an arrow directed at his cousin. Two days later, on 10 July 994, he died from his injuries. He was buried in Würzburg. In 1015, his son Duke Ernest I of Swabia, was buried next to his father. In the thirteenth century, their remains were returned to Melk Abbey.

== Historiography ==
Leopold ruled over the re-established Marcha orientalis for eighteen years. He organized and expanded it with great ability, and left behind a margravate that had assumed the character of "an ordered and civilized land". The chronicler Thietmar wrote that no man was wiser than he in all his actions, or of a worthier nature. Perhaps the highest testimony to Leopold's life and reputation came from the actions of Emperor Otto III, who immediately invested his son Henry I with his father's margravate.

Although Leopold is not mentioned in the Babenberger Chronicle written by his descendant Otto of Freising—which only starts with Leopold's grandson Adalbert—he is known today as the progenitor of the Babenberg dynasty. Otto of Freising's claim of ancestry to the Franconian Babenbergs, who are remembered for the Babenberger insurgency of the early tenth century, has not been proven, but cannot be completely ruled out.

In 1976, the millennial anniversary of Leopold's appointment as margrave was celebrated as a "Thousand Years of Austria". Celebrations under the same title were held twenty years later at the anniversary of the famous 996 Ostarrîchi document first mentioning the Old German name of Austria.

== Marriage ==
Leopold married Richardis, the daughter of Count Ernest IV of Sualafeldgau (according to other sources of the Ezzonid count Erenfried II) and probably the aunt of Duke Adalbero of Carinthia. Their marriage produced eight children:

1. Henry I (died 1018), second Margrave of Austria
2. Judith
3. Ernest I (died 1015), Duke of Swabia
4. Adalbert (985–1055), third Margrave of Austria
5. Poppo (986–1047), Archbishop of Trier
6. Kunigunda
7. Hemma, married Count Rapoto of Dießen
8. Christina, a nun at Trier

Leopold I, Margrave of Austria House of Babenberg Died: 994
Preceded by Burkhard	Margrave of Austria; 976–994	Succeeded by Henry I
