= Burkhard, Margrave of Austria =

First Margrave of Austria

Burkhard Earl of Geisenhausen was the first margrave in the Bavarian marchia orientalis, the territory that was to become the March of Austria, after its recapture at the 955 Battle of Lechfeld.

When German king Otto I had defeated the Magyars, the marchia was re-established in the conquered territories and put under the command of Burkhard, a brother-in-law of Duchess Judith, Duchess of Bavaria. As he had joined the uprising of Duke Henry II of Bavaria against Emperor Otto II, he was deposed at the Reichstag of Regensburg in 976, when the territory was given to Leopold of Babenberg.

From 970 to 972 Burkhard was multiple mentioned as Margrave of marchia orientalis. He is also considered the father of Bishop Henry I of Augsburg.

Burkhard's residence at marchia orientalis was probably at Poechlarn, this connects him in context with Rüdiger of Bechelaren (The song of the Nibelungs).

The German name for Austria was only first mentioned as Ostarrichi in a famous document of 996.

Margrave of the marchia orientalis c. 960–976	Succeeded by Leopold I

== See also ==
- March of Pannonia
- Leopold I, Margrave of Austria
- List of rulers of Austria
