= Henry I of Austria =

Margrave of Austria from 994 to 1018

Henry I
- Margrave of Austria
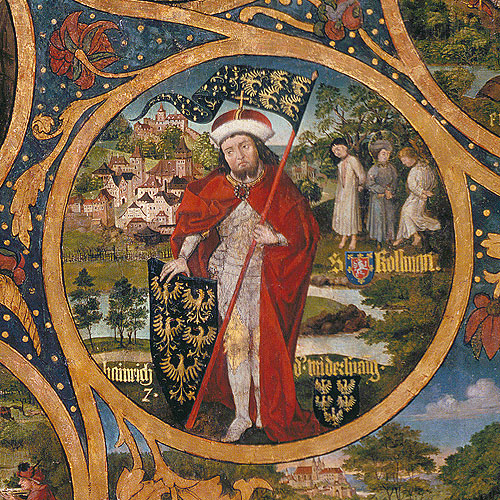
- Henry the Strong and the martyrdom of Saint Coloman, Babenberger Stammbaum, Klosterneuburg Monastery, 1489–1492
- Margrave: 994–1018
- Predecessor: Leopold I
- Successor: Adalbert
- Died: 23 June 1018
- Family: House of Babenberg
- Father: Leopold I
- Mother: Richardis of Sualafeldgau

Henry I (German: Heinrich, died 23 June 1018), known as Henry the Strong (German: Heinrich der Starke), was the Margrave of Austria from 994 to his death in 1018. He was a member of the House of Babenberg.

== Biography ==
Henry the Strong was the son of Leopold I, the first Margrave of Austria, and Richardis of Sualafeldgau. At the time of Henry the Strong's investiture in 996, the land between the Bisamberg and the March river had not yet been settled by Germans. In 1002, Emperor Henry II granted two land areas to the margrave: one of 18 square miles southwest of Vienna, and another of 22 hides between the Kamp and the March rivers. Both grants were on the frontier—the former on the Hungarian, the latter on the Polish. Henry the Strong faced his most significant threat from the north. Following the death of Duke Boleslaus II of Bohemia in 999, the area north of the Eastern March became unstable due to the brutality of his successor, Duke Boleslav III the Red, who was soon defeated by Polish Duke Bolesław I Chrobry, who became Duke of Bohemia, Moravia, and Slovakia.

After taking the marches of Lusatia and Sorbian Meissen, and the cities of Budziszyn and Meissen in 1002, Bolesław I Chrobry refused to pay tribute to the Empire from the conquered territories. Emperor Henry II, allied with the Lutici, responded with an offensive in 1003, and by the autumn of 1004, the German forces deposed Bolesław I from the Bohemian throne. Bolesław I, however, retained control over Moravia and Slovakia until 1018, and continued to threaten the eastern territories throughout these years. In 1015 and 1017, Bolesław I attacked the Eastern March and was defeated twice by Henry the Strong and his forces. Not long after his second victory against Bolesław I, on 23 June 1018, Henry I the Strong died "in his armour" according to one chronicler.

== Ostarrîchi document ==
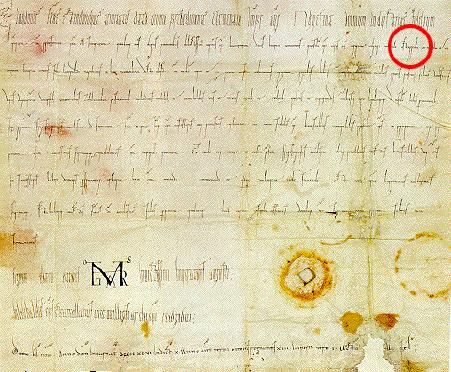
Document from 996 containing the Latin word Ostarrîchi, the first reference to the name Austria

During the margravate of Henry the Strong, a document was issued by Emperor Otto III on 1 November 996 in Bruchsal to Gottschalk von Hagenau, Bishop of Freising. The historical significance of the document lies in the fact that it is the first time that the name Ostarrîchi—the linguistic ancestor of Österreich, the German name for Austria—is mentioned, even though it applied only to a relatively small territory. The document concerns a donation of the "territory which is known in the vernacular as Ostarrichi" (regione vulgari vocabulo Ostarrichi), specified as the region of Neuhofen an der Ybbs (in loco Niuuanhova dicto). The emperor donated this land to the abbey of Freising as a fief. The lands and some other communities in the vicinity, which the abbey acquired later, were held until 1803, when they were incorporated into Austria. The document is kept today in the Bayerisches Hauptstaatsarchiv in Munich.

== See also ==
- List of rulers of Austria

Henry I of Austria House of Babenberg Died: 1018
Preceded by Leopold I	Margrave of Austria; 994–1018	Succeeded by Adalbert
