= Name of Austria =

The native (German) name of Austria, Österreich, derives from the Old High German word Ostarrîchi "eastern realm", recorded in the so-called Ostarrîchi Document of 996, applied to the Margraviate of Austria, a march, or borderland, of the Duchy of Bavaria created in 976. The name is seemingly comparable to Austrasia, the early middle age term for the "eastern lands" of Francia, as known from the written records.

The Old High German name parallels the Middle Latin name Marchia Orientalis ("eastern borderland"), alternatively called Marchia austriaca. The shorter Latinized name Austria is first recorded in the 12th century. It has occasionally led to confusion, because, while it renders the Germanic word for "east" it is reminiscent of the native Latin term for "south", auster (see Name of Australia).

In the 12th century, the Margraviate was elevated to the status of duchy, in 1453 to archduchy and from 1804 claiming imperial status, all the time retaining both the name Österreich and the Latin name Austria.

Ostmark, a translation of Marchia Orientalis into Standard German, was used officially from 1938, when the country was incorporated into the German Reich, until 1945.

The contemporary state was created in 1955, with the Austrian State Treaty, and is officially called the Republic of Austria (Republik Österreich).

== German name ==
Österreich is derived from Old High German Ostarrîchi. The term probably originates as a vernacular translation of the Latin name Marchia orientalis (eastern borderland). The ostar- is related to Old High German ōstan (eastern), but its exact derivation is unclear. Old High German rihhi had the meaning of "realm, domain".

The Marchia orientalis, also called the Bavarian Eastern March (Ostmark) and the March of Austria (Marchiam Austriae), was a prefecture of the Duchy of Bavaria. It was assigned to the Babenberg family in 976. The variant Ostarrîchi is known from a single usage dated 996. Later Medieval documents record the word as either Osterrîche (official) or as Osterlant (folk and poetic usage). The variation Osterrîche is first recorded in 998. Marcha Osterriche appears on a deed granted by Emperor Henry IV and dated 1058.

Friedrich Heer, a 20th-century Austrian historian, stated in his book Der Kampf um die österreichische Identität (The Struggle Over Austrian Identity), that the Germanic form Ostarrîchi was not a translation of the Latin word, but both resulted from a much older term originating in the Celtic languages of ancient Austria: more than 2,500 years ago, the major part of the actual country was called Norig by the Celtic Hallstatt culture of the land; according to Heer, no- or nor- meant "east" or "easterns", whereas -rig is related to the modern German Reich, meaning "realm". Accordingly, Norig would essentially mean the same as Ostarrîchi and Österreich, thus Austria. The Celtic name was eventually Latinised to Noricum after the Romans conquered the area that encloses most of modern-day Austria, in around 15 BC. Noricum later became a Roman province in the mid 1st century AD. Heer's hypothesis is not accepted by linguists.

An alternative theory, proposed by the Austrian Slavistics professor Otto Kronsteiner, suggests that the term Ostarrîchi is taken from a Slavic toponym Ostravica meaning 'pointed hill', taking its popular meaning of 'Eastern realm' at a much later time. This theory was rejected as untenable by Austrian linguist Heinz-Dieter Pohl.

Another remoter possibility is that the name comes from the Ostrogoths, who had a kingdom in what is now Austria and northern Italy.

=== Ostarrîchi document ===
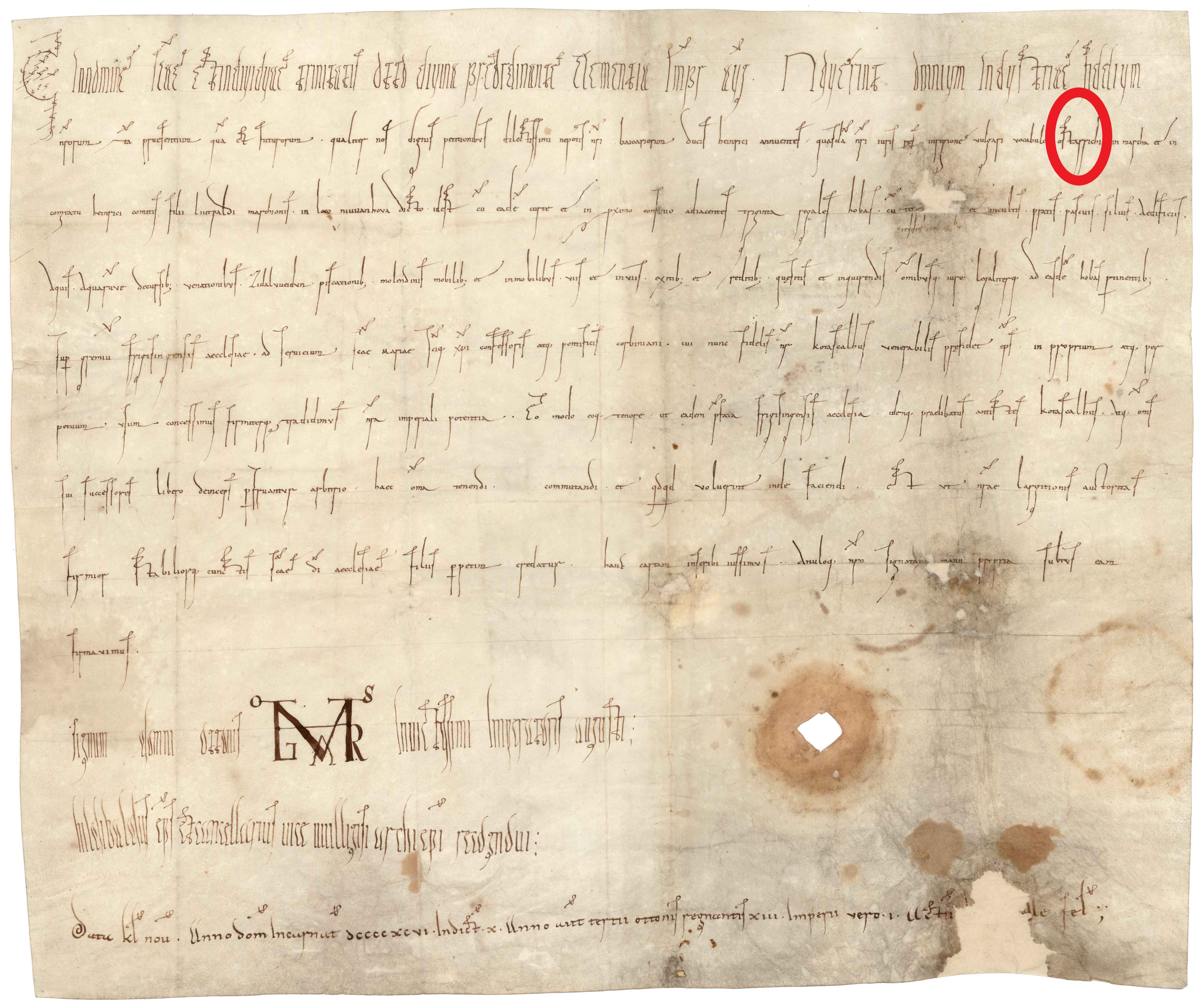
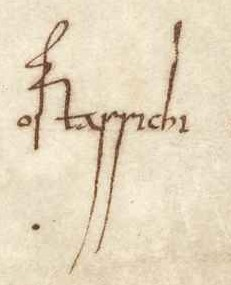
The first appearance of the word "Ostarrîchi", circled in red and magnified. Modern Austria honours this document, dated 996, as the founding of the nation.

The document was issued by Emperor Otto III on November 1, 996 in Bruchsal to Gottschalk von Hagenau, Bishop of Freising. It is today kept in the Bayrisches Hauptstaatsarchiv in Munich.

The historical significance of the document lies in the fact that it is the first time that the name Ostarrîchi, the linguistic ancestor of Österreich, the German name for Austria, is mentioned, even though it applied only to a relatively small territory. The document concerns a donation of the "territory which is known in the vernacular as Ostarrîchi" (regione vulgari vocabulo Ostarrichi), specified as the region of Neuhofen an der Ybbs (in loco Niuuanhova dicto). The emperor donated this land to the abbey of Freising as a fief. The lands and some other communities in the vicinity, which the abbey acquired later, were held until 1803, when they were incorporated into Austria.

== Latin name ==
The first written mention of the name Austria is found in the work Historia Langobardorum by Paolo Diacono and dates back to 796.

The name Austria is a latinization of German Österreich (that is, the spelling of the name Austria approximates, for the benefit of Latin speakers, the sound of the German name Österreich). This has led to much confusion as German Ost is "east", but Latin auster is "south". That is why the name is similar to Australia, which is derived from the Latin Terra Australis ("southern land").

The name is first recorded as Austrie marchionibus (Margrave of Austria) on a deed issued by Conrad III to the Klosterneuburg Monastery in 1147. On the Privilegium Minus of 1156, the name of the country is given as marchiam Austriae (March of Austria) and as Austriae ducatum (Duchy of Austria). In English usage, "Austria" is attested since the early 17th century.

== Other languages ==
=== Derivations from Österreich ===
All Germanic languages other than English have a name for Austria corresponding to Österreich: Afrikaans Oostenryk, Danish Østrig, Dutch Oostenrijk, West Frisian Eastenryk, Icelandic Austurríki, Faroese Eysturríki, Norwegian Østerrike (Bokmål) or Austerrike (Nynorsk) and Swedish Österrike. Finnish Itävalta is also derived from the German name: itä means "east" and valta "state". "Austria" or a phonetic derivative (such as Ausztria) was adopted in most other languages, including Hungarian, Italian, Spanish, Portuguese, Maltese, Ukrainian, Russian, Serbian, Croatian, Polish, Slovene, Greek, Estonian, Turkish, and Albanian. French is one of the exceptions within the Romance group in adapting the German name, Autriche. Catalan also did the same, though the forms are no longer in use. Apart from the modern-day form of Austria, antiquated forms used in Catalan were Hostalric and Hostalrich, and Estarlich, which are the forms derived in that language to correspond to German Österreich.

=== Derivations from Slavic němьci ===
The Arabic name for Austria is an-Nimsā (النمسا). The Arabic appellation of Austria was first used during the Crusades and was borrowed from the Slavic name for "Germans", němьci whence Russian немцы (nemcy), Polish Niemcy, Croatian/Bosnian Njemačka, Serbian Немачка/Nemačka, Slovene Nemčija, Czech Německo, Slovak Nemecko, etc.

In Persian, Austria was called an-Namsā (النمسا) (the same name as Arabic) and when the Turks later settled in Anatolia during the Ottoman Empire era, they borrowed the Arabic name of Austria as well, calling the country Nemçe. Currently, Persian uses the name Otrish (اتریش), derived from the French pronunciation.

In Romanian, a Romance language, the word neamț (pl. nemți) still exists as a Slavic borrowing, used as a colloquial name for Germans, alongside neologism german (pl. germani). However, historically, nemți was also used for Austrians in chronicles, while Austria was called Țara Nemțească (literally "the Austrian [now German] country"). Nowadays, the Romanian name of the country is Austria, while Austrians are called austrieci (sg. austriac).

=== Rakousko, Rakúsko ===
The Czech and Slovak languages have a peculiar name for Austria. Czech Rakousko and Slovak Rakúsko neither derived from German Österreich nor from Latin Austria. The Czech name of Rakousko, previously also Rakúsy and later Rakousy, which is still used for the states of Upper and Lower Austria (Horní, Dolní Rakousy), originates in the name of the Austrian castle and town of Raabs an der Thaya near the Czech–Austrian border, formerly also known as Ratgoz or Ratgos. It is worth noting that in his Geography the ancient writer Ptolemy mentions two tribes (of unknown ethnic affiliation) named Racatae and Racatriae which inhabit the areas around the Danube River "up to his bend", roughly corresponding to the region north of Vienna and southwestern Slovakia.

Another possible explanation of Czech Rakousko and Slovak Rakúsko: The predecessor of Austria and Slovenia was Slovene principality Carantania. The central part of Carantania (the territory of present-day southern Austria and north-eastern Slovenia) is named in Slovenian Koroška (or in the old version Korotan), in Slovak Korutánsko, in German Kärnten and in English Carinthia. The Old High German name of Austria (Ostarrîchi) appeared in written document more than three hundred years later than the name Carantania, while the shorter Latin name Austria was first mentioned only in 12th century. Therefore is it reasonably to assume that the present-day Czech and Slovak name for Austria (Rakousko, Rakúsko) developed from the original Slavic name for Carantania since in early middle ages and also later the ancestor of the present-day Slovaks and Slovenes were not divided by the wedge of Germanic or Germanized population.

== See also ==
- History of Austria (for a broader historical perspective)
- Austrasia
