= Ladislaus Sunthaym =

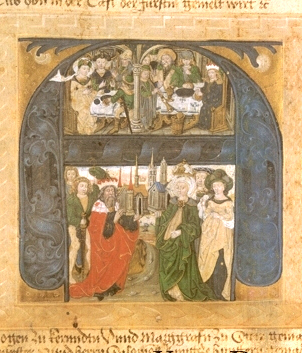
Detail of fol. 2 of the Tabulae Claustroneoburgenses

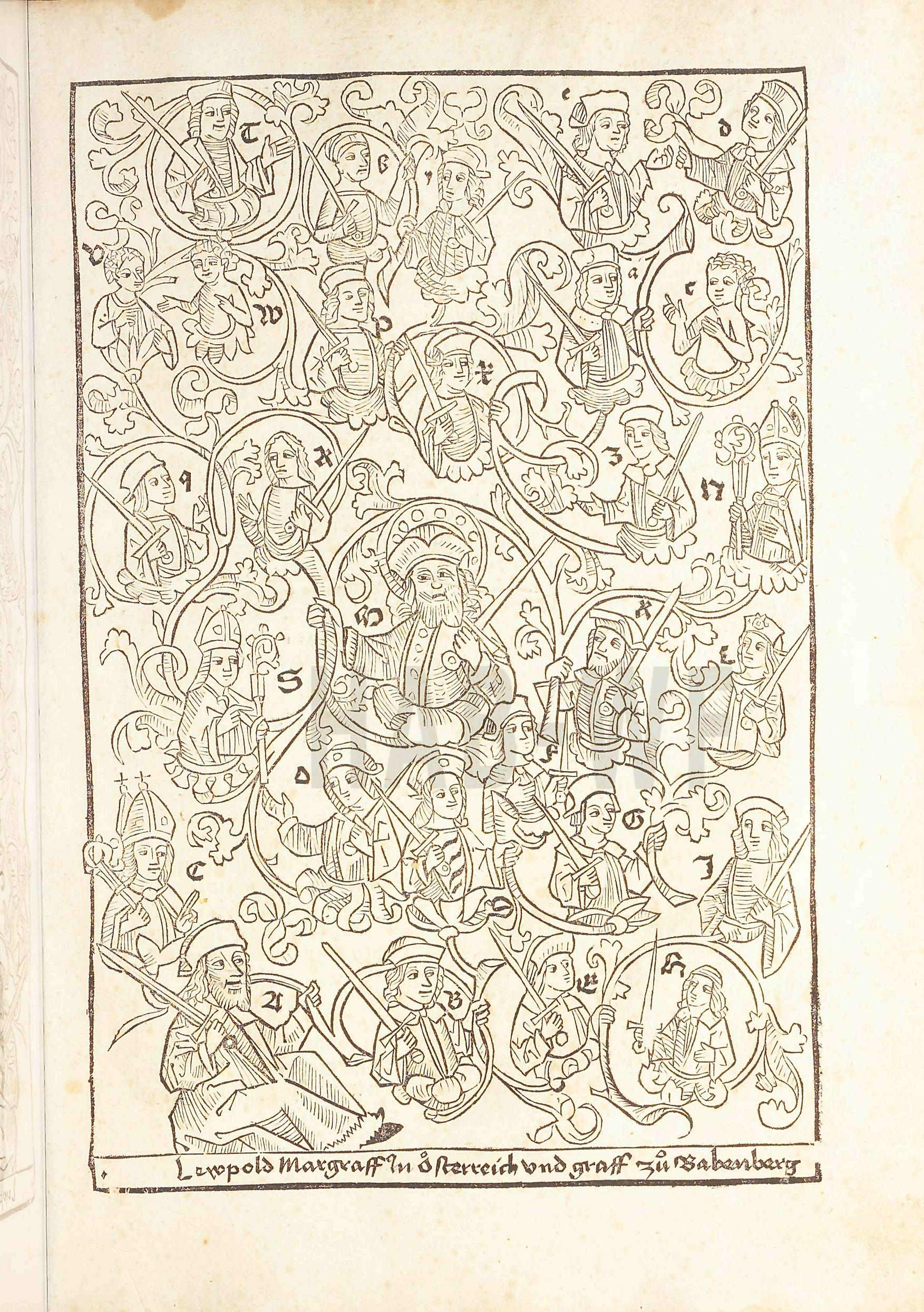
Schematic family tree of the House of Babenberg in the 1491 printed edition

Ladislaus Sunthaym (Sunthaym, Sunthaim, Sunthain, Sunthaymer, born c. 1440 in Ravensburg, died 1512 or 1513 in Vienna) was a German historian, genealogist and geographer.

He studied theology in Vienna and was elected "procurator of the Rhenish nation" (a kind of association of students from the Rhineland in Vienna) in 1460. He received his degree of Baccalaureus artium in 1465 and acted as a priest in Vienna from 1473. The abbot of Klosterneuburg in 1485 asked Sunthaym to compile a family history of Leopold III, Margrave of Austria in connection with the margrave's canonization. Sunthaym worked on the history and genealogy of the Babenberg family until 1489, perusing the histories of Otto von Freising and Thomas Ebendorfer. The finished work was exhibited in Klosterneuburg abbey as a richly illuminated parchment manuscript, the so-called Tabulae Claustroneoburgenses. The manuscript was supplemented by a great triptych based on the Babenberg family tree, made by the workshop of Hans Part during the period c. 1489 to 1492, for the benefit of the pilgrims visiting Klosterneuburg (now in the monastery museum).

In 1491, the work was published in print by Michael Furter of Basel. As a result, Sunthaym became widely known as a historiographer. He was a member of the Sodalitas litteraria Danubiana ("Danubian literary society") in 1498.Emperor Maximilian charged Sunthaym with a major project, reviewing the genealogy of the House of Habsburg.

In 1504, Sunthaym was a member of the chapter of St. Stephen's Cathedral, Vienna. In 1505, he presented his Habsburg genealogy to the emperor. Sunthaym's geographical works, covering Austria, Bavaria, Swabia, the Alsace and parts of Franconia, are an important source for the economy and demographics of these regions at the end of the medieval period.
