= Ernest I of Swabia =

Duke of Swabia

Ernest I, Duke of Swabia
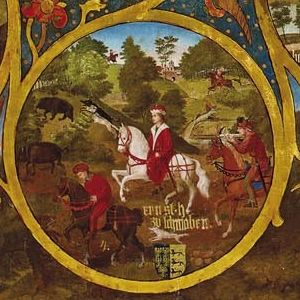
- Ernest I, Duke of Swabia

Duke of Swabia
- Reign: 1012-1015
- Predecessor: Otto I
- Successor: Ernest II
- Died: 31 March/May 1015
- Noble family: House of Babenberg
- Spouse: Gisela of Swabia
- Issue: Ernest II, Duke of Swabia; Herman IV, Duke of Swabia
- Father: Leopold I
- Mother: Richardis of Sualafeldgau

Ernest I (died 31 March or 31 May 1015) was the Duke of Swabia (1012–1015). He was a younger son of Leopold I, the Babenberg Margrave of Austria. His mother was called Richardis of Sualafeldgau.

== Life and family ==
In 1012 Henry II, King of Germany, gave the Duchy of Swabia to Ernest following the death of its childless ruler Hermann III. In order to further legitimatize his rule as duke, he married Gisela of Swabia, the eldest sister of Hermann.

Ernest and Gisela had two sons, Ernest and Hermann, both of whom would eventually become dukes of Swabia themselves. Ernest died in 1015 as a result of a hunting accident and was succeeded by his son Ernest. He was buried in Würzburg.

== Sources ==
- Wolfram, Herwig (2006). Conrad II, 990-1039: Emperor of Three Kingdoms. Translated by Kaiser, Denise A. The Pennsylvania State University Press.

Preceded by Hermann III	Duke of Swabia; 1012–1015	Succeeded by Ernest II
