= Gregor Reisch =

German Carthusian monk and humanist scholar (c.1467–1525)

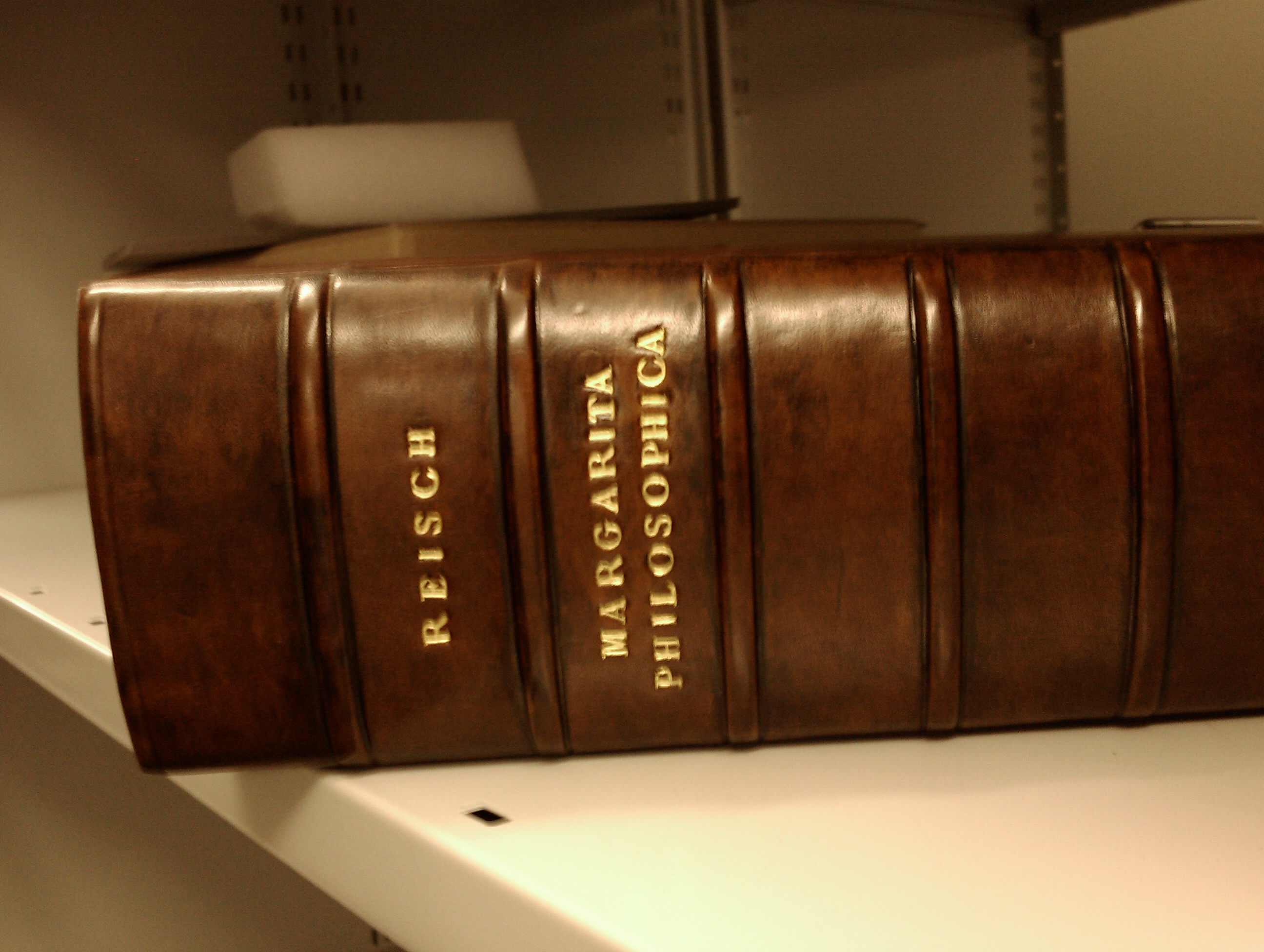
Reisch's book in the Science Museum at Wroughton

Gregor Reisch (c. 1467 – 9 May 1525) was a German Carthusian monk and humanist scholar. He is best known for his compilation Margarita Philosophica, one of the earliest printed encyclopedias of general knowledge.

== Life ==
Reisch was born at Balingen in Württemberg, about 1467. He became a student at the University of Freiburg in 1487 and received the degree of magister in 1489. He remained at the university as a teacher and became a Carthusian monk around 1500 but continued his teaching and scholarly work. From 1500 to 1502 he was prior at Kleinbasel and from 1503 to shortly before his death he was prior at Freiburg Charterhouse. In 1510, Reisch was appointed counselor and father confessor to Maximilian I. He was also a visitor (inspector) for the Rhenish province of his order and as such he made strenuous exertions to combat Lutheranism.

Reisch was a friend of the most celebrated humanists of the era. His notable students included Johann Eck and Martin Waldseemüller. Reisch had a reputation for adaptability, and was regarded as an "oracle". He was one of the most conspicuous of the intellectuals at the commencement of the new era who sought to prepare encyclopedic works of knowledge.

== Works ==
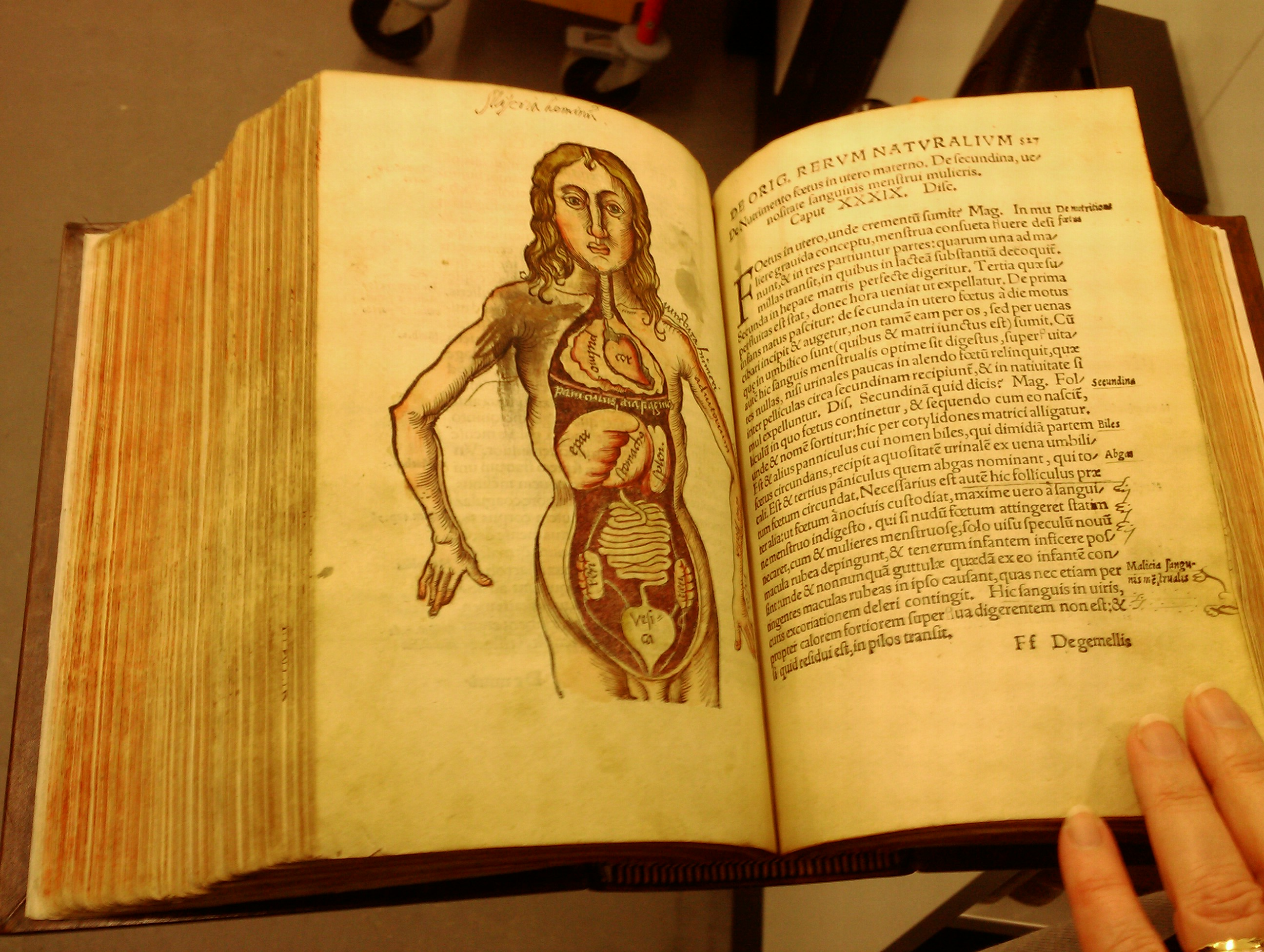
Anatomy in Margarita Philosophica - 1565 - now in Science Museum at Wroughton

His chief work is the Margarita Philosophica (Philosophical Pearl), first published in 1503 and widely used as a general textbook in universities throughout western Europe. It is an encyclopedia of knowledge and contains in twelve books: Latin grammar, dialectics, rhetoric, arithmetic, music, geometry, astronomy, physics, natural history, physiology, psychology, and ethics. The usefulness of the work was increased by numerous woodcuts and a full index.

Like many textbooks of the time, the book was written as a dialogue between student and teacher. The book was very popular for its comparative brevity and form. It was long a standard textbook of the universities. Alexander von Humboldt said of it that it had "for a half-century, aided in a remarkable manner the spread of knowledge".

The first two editions were printed by Johann Schott from Strassburg. In 1508 Michael Furter and Johann Schott jointly published a third edition of the Margarita Philosophica. Some woodcuts in the book are assumed to be made by Urs Graf.

In 1510 Reisch also published the statutes and privileges of the Carthusian Order, and assisted Erasmus of Rotterdam in his edition of Jerome.

Reisch died at Freiburg, Baden, on 9 May 1525.
