= Margraviate of Austria =

Southeastern frontier march of the Holy Roman Empire, c. 970–1156

Coordinates: 48°13′N 16°22′E

Margraviate of Austria Eastern March Marcha Austriae (Latin) Ostarrîchi (Old High German)
- c. 970–1156
- Ancient arms of the House of Babenberg, Margraves of Austria

- Map of the Margraviate of Austria within the Duchy of Bavaria c. 1000 AD. Austria; Other parts of Bavaria; Rest of the German Kingdom
- Status: Margraviate, within the Duchy of Bavaria and the Holy Roman Empire
- Capital: Melk
- Common languages: Austro-Bavarian German; Medieval Latin; Old High German
- Religion: Roman Catholicism
- Demonym: Austrian
- Government: Feudal monarchy
- Margrave of Austria
  - c. 970–976: Burkhard (first known margrave)
  - 1141–1156: Henry II (last margrave, and first duke)
- Historical era: Middle Age
  - Established: c. 970
  - Disestablished: 1156
Preceded by	Succeeded by
March of Pannonia; Hungarian March	Duchy of Austria

The Margraviate of Austria (Latin: Marcha Austriae; German: Markgrafschaft Österreich) was a medieval frontier march, centered along the river Danube, between the river Enns and the Vienna Woods (Wienerwald), within the territory of the modern Austrian provinces of Upper Austria and Lower Austria. It existed from c. 970 to 1156.

It stemmed from the previous frontier structures, initially created for the defense of eastern Bavarian borders against the Avars, who were defeated and conquered during the reign of Charlemagne (d. 814). Throughout the Frankish period, the region was under jurisdiction of Eastern Frankish rulers, who held Bavaria and appointed frontier commanders (counts) in eastern regions.

At the beginning of the 10th century, the region was raided by Magyars. They were defeated in the Battle of Lechfeld (955) and gradual German reconquest of the region began. By about 970, newly retaken frontier regions along the river Danube were reorganized into a frontier county (margraviate) that became known as the Bavarian Eastern March (Latin: Marcha orientalis) or Ostarrichi (German: Österreich). The first known margrave was Burkhard, who is mentioned in sources since 970 several times as Margrave of Marcha orientalis.

Since 976, it was governed by margraves from the Franconian noble House of Babenberg. The margraviate protected the eastern borders of the Holy Roman Empire, towards neighbouring Hungary. It became an Imperial State in its own right when the Austrian margraves were elevated to Dukes of Austria in 1156.

== Name ==
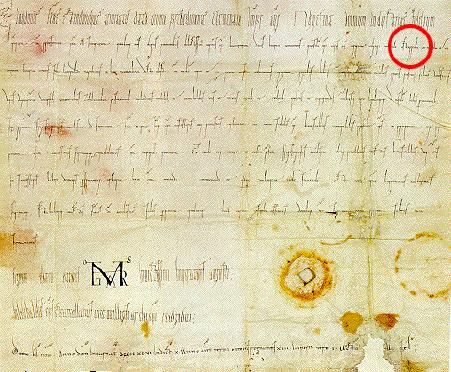
The first mention of the word Ostarrîchi (996), the word is marked with a red circle.

In contemporary Latin sources, the entity was called: Marcha orientalis ("Eastern march"), marchia Austriae, or Austrie marchionibus. The Old High German name Ostarrîchi first appeared on a famous deed of donation issued by Emperor Otto III at Bruchsal in November 996. The phrase regione vulgari vocabulo Ostarrîchi, that is, "the region commonly called Ostarrîchi", probably only referred to some estates around the manor of Neuhofen an der Ybbs; nevertheless the term Ostarrîchi is linguistic ancestor of the German name for Austria, Österreich.

Later the march was also called the Margraviate of Austria (German: Markgrafschaft Österreich) or the Bavarian Eastern March (Bayerische Ostmark, the second word being a German translation of marcha orientalis, though no example of this usage in relation to Austria is known before the 19th century). The Bavarian designation is used in historiography in order to differentiate it from the Saxon Eastern March (Sächsische Ostmark) in the northeast. During the Anschluss period of 1938–45 the Nazi authorities tried to replace the term "Austria" with Ostmark.

== Geography ==
The march comprised the lands north and south of the Danube river, with the Enns tributary in the west forming the border with the Traungau shire of the Bavarian stem duchy. The eastern frontier with the Hungarian settlement area in the Pannonian Basin ran along the Morava (March) and Leitha rivers, with the Gyepű borderland (the present-day Burgenland region) beyond. In the north, the march bordered on the Bohemian duchy of the Přemyslids, and the lands in the south belonged to the Dukes of Carinthia, also newly instated in 976. The early march corresponded closely to the modern region of Lower Austria.

The initial Babenberger residence was probably at Pöchlarn on the former Roman limes, but maybe already Melk, where subsequent rulers resided. The original march coincided with the modern Wachau, but was shortly enlarged eastwards at least as far as the Wienerwald. Under Margrave Ernest the Brave (1055–1075), the colonisation of the northern Waldviertel up to the Thaya river and the Bohemian march of Moravia was begun, and the Hungarian March was merged into Austria. The margraves' residence later was moved down the Danube to Klosterneuburg until 1145, when Vienna became the official capital. The Babenbergs had a defense system of several castles built in the Wienerwald mountain range and along the Danube river, among them Greifenstein. The surrounding area was colonized and Christianized by the Bavarian Bishops of Passau, with ecclesiastical centres at the Benedictine abbey of Sankt Pölten, at Klosterneuburg Monastery and Heiligenkreuz Abbey.

The early margraviate was populated by a mix of Slavic and native Romano-Germanic peoples who were apparently speaking Rhaeto-Romance languages, remnants of which remain today in parts of northern Italy (Friulian and Ladin) and in Switzerland (Romansh). In the Austrian Alps some valleys retained their Rhaeto-Romance speakers until the 17th century.

== History ==
Consolidation of the territory

=== Background ===
The first marches covering approximately the territory that would become Austria and Slovenia were the Avar March and the adjacent March of Carantania (the later March of Carinthia) in the south. Both were established in the late 8th century by Charlemagne upon the incorporation of the territory of the Agilolfing dukes of Bavaria against the invasions of the Avars. When the Avars disappeared in the 820s, they were replaced largely by West Slavs, who settled here within the state of Great Moravia. The March of Pannonia was set apart from the Duchy of Friuli in 828 and set up as a march against Moravia within the East Frankish regnum of Bavaria. These march, already called marcha orientalis, corresponded to a frontier along the Danube from the Traungau to Savaria and the Rába river including the Vienna Basin. By the 890s, the Pannonian march seems to have disappeared, along with the threat from Great Moravia, during the Hungarian invasions of Europe. Upon the defeat of Margrave Luitpold of Bavaria at the 907 Battle of Pressburg, all East Frankish lands beyond the Enns river were lost.

=== Margraviate ===
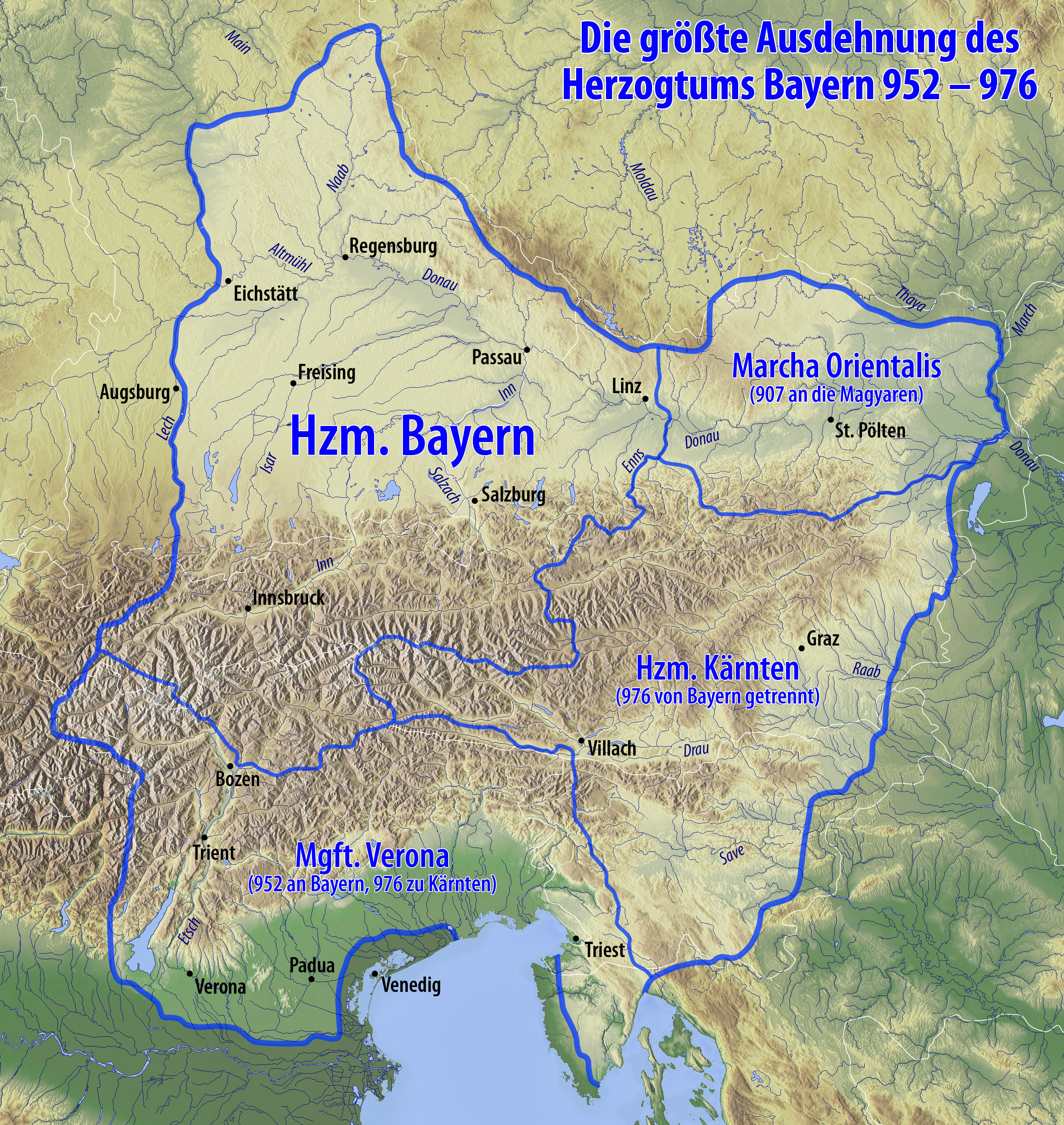
Duchy of Bavaria and its dependencies in 976

In 955, King Otto I of Germany had started the reconquest with his victory at the 955 Battle of Lechfeld. The obscurity of the period from circa 900 until 976 leads some to posit that a Pannonian or Austrian march existed against the Magyars, alongside the other marches which had been incorporated into Bavaria by 952 (Carniola, Carinthia, Istria, and Verona). However, much of Pannonia was still conquered by the Magyars. Otto I had a new Eastern March (marcha orientalis) erected and by about 960, he appointed Burchard as margrave. In 976, during a general restructuring of Bavaria upon the insurrection of Duke Henry II the Wrangler, Otto's son and successor Emperor Otto II deposed Burchard and appointed the Babenberg count Leopold the Illustrious from the House of Babenberg margrave in turn for his support.

Margravial Austria reached its greatest height under Leopold III, a great friend of the church and founder of abbeys. He patronised towns and developed a great level of territorial independence. In 1139, Leopold IV inherited Bavaria. When his successor, the last margrave, Henry Jasomirgott, was deprived of Bavaria in 1156, Austria was elevated to a duchy independent from Bavaria by the Privilegium Minus of Emperor Frederick Barbarossa. From 1192 the House of Babenberg also ruled over the neighbouring Duchy of Styria. The line became extinct with the death of Duke Frederick II of Austria at the 1246 Battle of the Leitha River. The heritage was finally asserted by the German king Rudolph of Habsburg against King Ottokar II of Bohemia in the 1278 Battle on the Marchfeld.

== See also ==
- History of Austria
- Pannonian March
- Avarian March
- Hungarian March
