= Poppo (archbishop of Trier) =

Archbishop of Trier from 1016 to 1047

- Archbishop of Trier
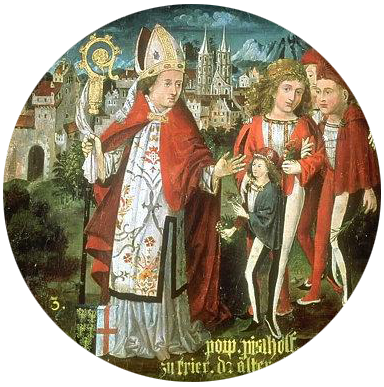
- Church: Catholic Church
- Diocese: Electorate of Trier
- In office: 1016–1047

Personal details
- Born: c. 986
- Died: 16 June 1047

Poppo von Babenberg (c. 986 – 16 June 1047) was the Archbishop of Trier from 1016 to his death.

== Life ==
Poppo was a son of Leopold I of Austria and his wife, Richardis of Sualafeldgau.

He was educated in Regensburg and appointed by the Emperor Henry II in 1007 to be the first provost of his new cathedral at Bamberg. When the Archbishop Megingod died in 1015, Henry selected Poppo to be his successor in Trier. He was consecrated by Erkanbald, Archbishop of Mainz, later in 1016 he was confirmed by Pope Benedict VIII.

Between 1028 and 1030, he travelled with the monk Symeon of Trier to the Holy Land. Later, Poppo had the monk buried in the Porta Nigra and on his word Pope Benedict IX canonised him. From 1037 to his death, Poppo was occupied extending Trier Cathedral westward. While inspecting construction on 16 June 1047, Poppo died. He was buried in the church of Saint Symeon in Trier, which he had founded. During the Second World War, his grave was completely destroyed.
