= Pöchlarn =

- Municipality
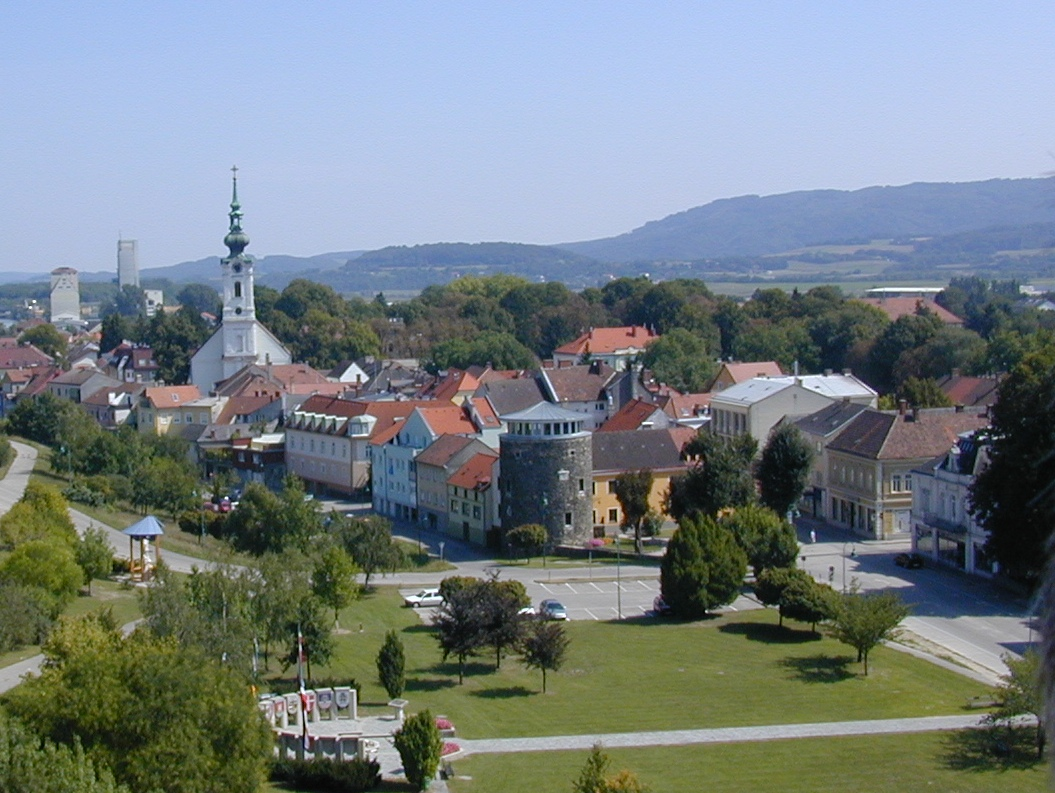
- Pöchlarn

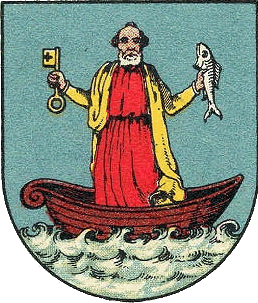
- Coat of arms

- Location within Austria
- Coordinates: 48°12′N 15°12′E
- Country: Austria
- State: Lower Austria
- District: Melk

Government
  - Mayor: Franz Heisler (ÖVP)

Area
  - Total: 17.92 km^{2} (6.92 sq mi)
- Elevation: 216 m (709 ft)

Population (2018-01-01)
  - Total: 3,912
  - Density: 218.3/km^{2} (565.4/sq mi)
- Time zone: UTC+1 (CET)
  - Summer (DST): UTC+2 (CEST)
- Postal code: 3380
- Area code: 02757
- Website: www.poechlarn.at

Pöchlarn (Bavarian: Böchlarn) is a town on the Danube River in the district of Melk in the Austrian state of Lower Austria. The painter and writer Oskar Kokoschka was born here in 1886.

== Population ==
Historical population
Year	Pop.	±%
1869	1,756	—
1880	1,904	+8.4%
1890	2,192	+15.1%
1900	2,675	+22.0%
1910	2,919	+9.1%
1923	2,870	−1.7%
1934	3,137	+9.3%
1939	3,116	−0.7%
1951	3,136	+0.6%
1961	3,222	+2.7%
1971	3,521	+9.3%
1981	3,626	+3.0%
1991	3,523	−2.8%
2001	3,473	−1.4%
2011	3,935	+13.3%

== Personalities ==
- Rüdiger von Bechelaren
- Oskar Kokoschka, painter
- Johann Rasch
- Ursula Strauss, actress
