= Neuhofen an der Ybbs =

- Municipality
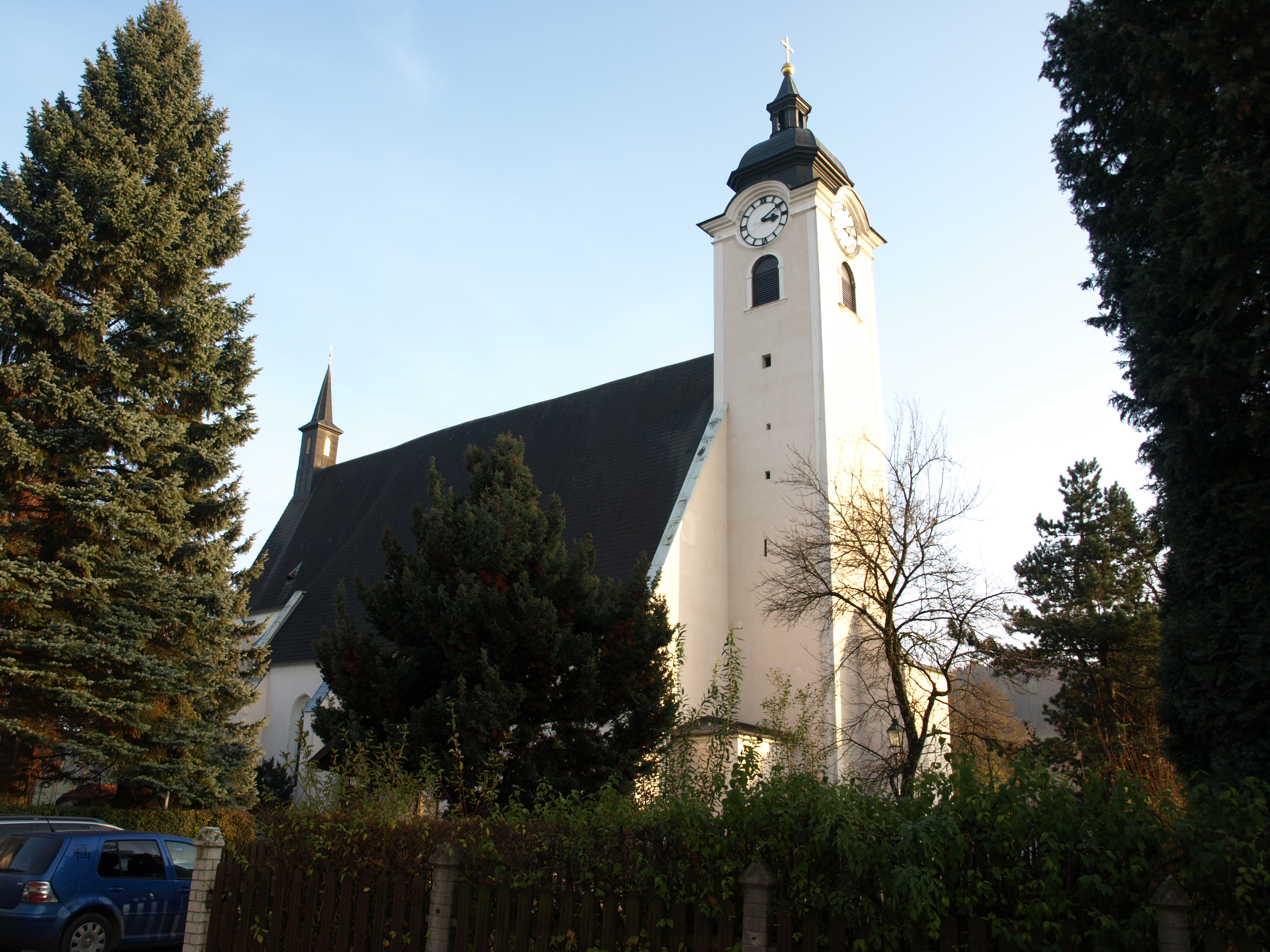
- Church of the Assumption of the Virgin Mary

- Coat of arms

- Location within Austria
- Coordinates: 48°3′N 14°51′E
- Country: Austria
- State: Lower Austria
- District: Amstetten

Government
  - Mayor: Maria Kogler (ÖVP)

Area
  - Total: 36.41 km^{2} (14.06 sq mi)
- Elevation: 319 m (1,047 ft)

Population (2018-01-01)
  - Total: 2,930
  - Density: 80.5/km^{2} (208/sq mi)
- Time zone: UTC+1 (CET)
  - Summer (DST): UTC+2 (CEST)
- Postal code: 3364
- Area code: 07475
- Website: www.neuhofen-ybbs.at

Neuhofen an der Ybbs is a municipality in the district of Amstetten in Lower Austria in Austria.

== Geography ==
Neuhofen an der Ybbs lies in the Mostviertel in the hills north of the Hochkogel at the foot of the Kornberg. Despite its name, it does not lie directly on the river Ybbs. About 20 percent of the municipality is forested.
