= House of Babenberg =

Austrian noble dynasty from c. 962 to 1246

- Country: Margraviate of Austria; Duchy of Austria; Duchy of Styria; Duchy of Bavaria
- Founded: c. 962; 1064 years ago
- Founder: Leopold I
- Final ruler: Frederick II
- Titles: Duke, Margrave, Count
- Dissolution: 1246; 780 years ago

The House of Babenberg was a noble dynasty of Austrian Dukes and Margraves. Descending from the Popponids and originally from Bamberg in the Duchy of Franconia (present-day Bavaria), the Babenbergs ruled the imperial Margraviate of Austria from its creation in 976 AD until its elevation to a duchy in 1156, and from then until the extinction of the line in 1246, whereafter they were succeeded by the House of Habsburg.

== Origin ==
=== Elder and Younger Houses of Babenberg ===
The Babenberg family can be broken down into two distinct groups;

1. The Elder or Franconian House of Babenberg. Their name refers to Babenburg Castle, the present site of Bamberg Cathedral. They also called Popponids after their progenitor Count Poppo of Grapfeld (d. 839–41). They were related to the Frankish Robertian dynasty and ancestors of the Franconian Counts of Henneberg and the House of Schweinfurt.
2. The Younger or Austrian House of Babenberg, or simply the House of Babenberg, are the descendants of Margrave Leopold I, who ruled Austria from 976 onwards.

The second group claimed to have originated from the first, but scholars have not been able to verify that claim. In addition, a descent from the Bavarian Luitpolding dukes is assumed (though perhaps in maternal line).

=== Popponids ===
Like the French royal Capetian dynasty, the Elder Babenbergs likely descended from the Robertians. The earliest known Babenberg, Count Poppo I of Grapfeld, was first mentioned in 819 as a ruler in the gau of Grabfeld, a historic region in northeastern Franconia bordering on Thuringia. He may have been a descendant of the Robertian Count Cancor of Hesbaye.

One of Poppo's sons, Henry, served as princeps militiae under King Louis the Younger and was sometimes called margrave (marchio) and duke (dux) in Franconia under King Charles the Fat of East Francia. He was killed fighting against the Vikings during the Siege of Paris in 886. Another son, Poppo II, was margrave in Thuringia from 880 to 892, when he was deposed by King Charles' successor Arnulf of Carinthia. The Popponids had been favoured by Charles the Fat, but Arnulf reversed this policy in favour of rivalling Conrad the Elder, a member of the Conradine dynasty from the Lahngau in Rhenish Franconia and relative of Arnulf's consort Ota.

=== Babenberg Feud ===
The leaders of the Babenbergs were the sons of Duke Henry, who called themselves after their castle of Babenburg on the upper Main river, around which their possessions centered. The city of Bamberg was built around the ancestral castle of the family. The Conradines were led by Conrad the Elder and his brothers Rudolf and Gebhard, probably the sons of Count Udo of Neustria.

The rivalry between the Babenberg and Conradine families was intensified by their efforts to extend their authority in the region of the middle Main, and this quarrel, known as the "Babenberg feud", came to a first head in 892, when King Arnulf deposed Poppo II as Thuringian ruler, appointing Conrad the Elder instead, and installed Conrad's brother Rudolf as Bishop of Würzburg. The struggle intensified at the beginning of the 10th century during the troubled reign of Arnulf's son King Louis the Child. Clashes of arms occurred in 902, when the Conradine laid siege to Babenburg Castle and arrested Adalhard of Babenberg. The next year, Adalhard was executed at the Reichstag of Forchheim; in return, the Babenbergs occupied the city of Würzburg and expelled Bishop Rudolf.

Meanwhile, Rudolf's brother Gebhard was appointed Duke of Lotharingia in 903, and had to cope both with revolting nobles and the continuing attacks by Babenberg forces. Both sides met in the battle of Fritzlar on 27 February 906, where the Conradines won a decisive victory, although Conrad the Elder fell in the battle. Two of the Babenberg brothers were also killed. The third, Adalbert, was summoned before the imperial court by the regent Archbishop Hatto I of Mainz, a partisan of the Conradines. He refused to appear, held his own for a time in his castle at Theres against the king's forces, but surrendered in 906, and in spite of a promise of safe-conduct by Hatto was beheaded.

Conrad the Younger became Duke of Franconia in 906 and King of East Francia (as Conrad I) in 911, while the Babenbergs lost their influence in Franconia.

== Margraves of Austria ==
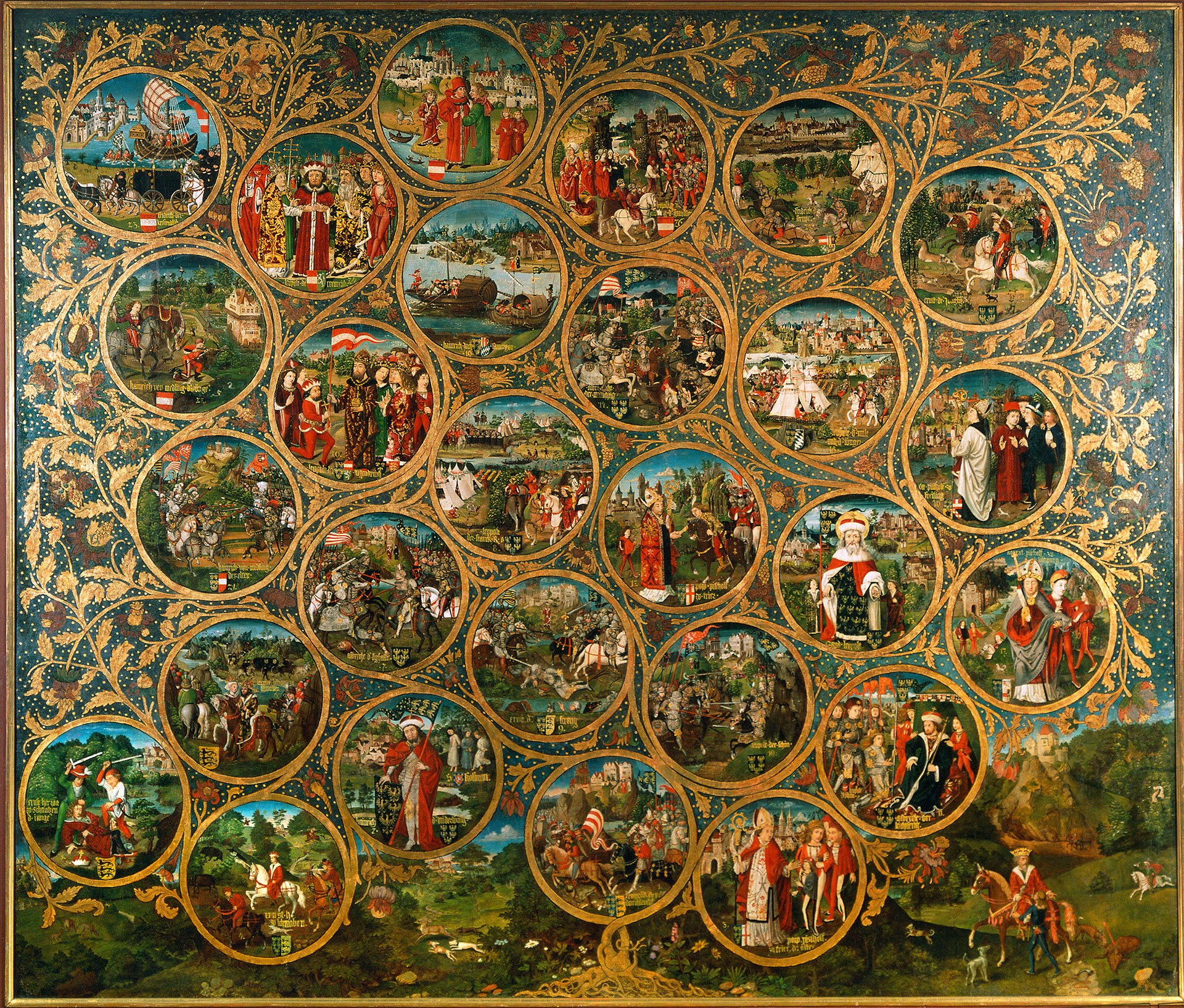
The Babenberg family tree triptych at Klosterneuburg Monastery (c. 1490, based on the genealogy by Ladislaus Sunthaym)

In 962, the Bavarian count Leopold I (Liupo), possibly a descendant of the Luitpolding duke Arnulf of Bavaria, was first mentioned as a faithful follower of Emperor Otto I. He remained a loyal supporter of Otto's son and successor Otto II and in 976 appears as count of the Bavarian Eastern March, then a district not more than 60 miles in breadth on the eastern frontier of the duchy, which grew into the Margraviate of Austria. Leopold, who received the territory as a reward for his fidelity to Emperor Otto II during the uprising of Duke Henry II of Bavaria, extended its area down the Danube river into what is today Lower Austria at the expense of the retreating Magyars.

Leopold was succeeded in 994 by his son Henry I, who continued his father's policy, was followed in 1018 by his brother Adalbert, whose marked loyalty to Emperor Henry II and his Salian successor Henry III was rewarded by many tokens of favour. Adalbert expanded the Austrian territory up to the present borders on the Leitha, March and Thaya rivers. He was succeeded in 1055 by his son, Ernest.

Leopold II, margrave from 1075, quarrelled with Emperor Henry IV during the Investiture Controversy, when he supported the papal side of Bishop Altmann of Passau. Though Leopold had to cope with the invading troops of Duke Vratislaus II of Bohemia and was defeated at the 1082 Battle of Mailberg, the emperor was unable to oust him from his march or to prevent the succession of his son Leopold III in 1096. Between 1075 - 1095 the dynasty had its seat at Babenberg Castle of Gars am Kamp.

Leopold III supported Henry V, the son of Emperor Henry IV, in his rising against his father, but was soon drawn over to the emperor's side. In 1106 he married the daughter of Henry IV, Agnes, widow of Duke Frederick I of Swabia. In 1125 he declined the royal crown in favour of Lothair of Supplinburg. His zeal in founding monasteries, such as Klosterneuburg Monastery, earned for him his surname "the Pious", and canonization by Pope Innocent VIII in 1485. He is regarded as the patron saint of Lower and Upper Austria.

== Dukes of Austria ==
One of Leopold's younger sons was Bishop Otto of Freising. His eldest son Leopold IV became margrave in 1136, and in 1139 received the Duchy of Bavaria from the hands of King Conrad III, who had banned the Welf duke Henry the Proud.

Leopold's brother Henry Jasomirgott (allegedly named after his favourite oath, "Yes, so [help] me God!") was made Count Palatine of the Rhine in 1140, and became Margrave of Austria on Leopold's death in 1141. Having married Gertrude, the widow of Henry the Proud, he was invested in 1143 with the Duchy of Bavaria, and resigned his office as count palatine. In 1147 he participated in the Second Crusade, and after his return, renounced Bavaria at the instance of the new king Frederick Barbarossa who gave the duchy of Bavaria to Henry the Proud's son, Duke Henry the Lion of Saxony. As compensation for this, Austria, the capital of which had been transferred to Vienna about 1155, was elevated into a duchy according to the Privilegium Minus.

=== Rise to power ===
The second duke was Henry's son Leopold V, who succeeded him in 1177 and took part in the crusades of 1182 and 1190 as well as the Third Crusade. In Palestine, he quarrelled with King Richard I of England, captured him on his homeward journey and handed him over to Emperor Henry VI. Leopold increased the territories of the Babenbergs by acquiring the Duchy of Styria under the will of his kinsman Duke Ottokar IV. He died in 1194, and Austria fell to one son, Frederick, and Styria to another, Leopold; but on Frederick's death in 1198 they were again united by Leopold as Duke Leopold VI, surnamed "the Glorious".

The new duke fought in the crusades in Spain, Egypt, and Palestine, but is more celebrated as a lawgiver, a patron of letters, and a founder of many towns. Under him Vienna became the centre of culture in Germany and the great school of Minnesingers. His later years were spent in strife with his son Frederick, and he died in 1230 at San Germano, now renamed Cassino, whither he had gone to arrange the peace between Emperor Frederick II and Pope Gregory IX.

=== Extinction ===
Frederick II, Leopold VI's son by Theodora Angelina, succeeded his father as duke upon the elder man's death in 1230. Frederick II soon earned the epithet "the Quarrelsome" from his ongoing disputes with the kings of Hungary and Bohemia and with Holy Roman Emperor Frederick II. Duke Frederick deprived his mother and sisters of their possessions, was hated by his subjects on account of his oppressive rule, and, in 1236, was placed under the imperial ban and driven from Austria. However, he was later restored to his duchy when Emperor Frederick II was excommunicated. Subsequently, Duke Frederick II treated with Emperor Frederick II in vain to make Austria a kingdom.

The male line of the Babenbergs became extinct in 1246, when Frederick II was killed in battle (the Henneberg branch of the Franconian Babenbergs lived on until 1583 when its lands were divided among the two branches of the Wettin family).

Frederick's heir general was Gertrude of Austria, the only child of his late elder brother, Henry of Austria by that man's wife, Agnes of Thuringia. However, neither her husbands nor her son succeeded in settling the Babenberg inheritance under their power. Gertrude's only surviving child, Agnes of Baden, tried to reclaim at least part of her inheritance through her third husband Ulrich II of Heunburg, but was unsuccessful.

After some years of struggle known as the War of the Babenberg Succession (1246–1256/78/82), the Duchies of Austria and Styria fell to Ottokar II of Bohemia, and subsequently to Rudolph I of Habsburg, whose descendants were to rule Austria until 1918.

== Genetic legacy ==
=== Byzantine blood ===
All the Babenberg dukes from Leopold V onward were descended from Byzantine emperors — Leopold's mother, Theodora Komnene, being a granddaughter of the Emperor, John II Komnenos. Subsequently, Leopold V's younger son, Leopold VI, also married a Byzantine princess (Theodora Angelina), as did his youngest son (by Theodora), Frederick II, who married Sophia Laskarina.

=== The Babenbergs and the Habsburgs ===
The next dynasty in Austria—the Habsburgs—were originally not descendants of the Babenbergs. It was not until the children of Albert I of Germany that the Babenberg blood was brought into the Habsburg line, though this blood was from the pre-ducal Babenbergs. A side effect of this marriage was the use of the Babenberg name Leopold by the Habsburgs for one of their sons.

The Habsburgs did eventually gain descent from the Babenberg dukes, though at different times. The first Habsburg line to be descended from the Babenbergs was the Albertine line. This was achieved through the marriage of Albert III, Duke of Austria to Beatrix of Nuremberg. As such, their son, Albert IV, Duke of Austria, was the first Habsburg duke who was descended from the Babenberg dukes. However, the male line of that branch of the Habsburgs died out in 1457 with Ladislas the Posthumus of Bohemia and Hungary.

The next Habsburg line to gain Babenberg blood was the Styrian line, which occurred with the children of Ferdinand I, Holy Roman Emperor and Anna of Bohemia and Hungary, the latter of whom descended from Babenberg dukes. It was actually from Elizabeth of Austria, the sister of Ladislas V Posthumus of Bohemia, that the Styrian line gained their Babenberg blood.

The Spanish line was the last Habsburg line to gain Babenberg blood. Again it was via the previous Habsburg line to gain Babenberg blood (i.e. the Styrian) that the Spanish Habsburg gained their descent from the Babenbergs — Anna of Austria, the wife of Philip II of Spain and mother of Philip (from whom all subsequent Spanish Habsburgs were descended), was a male-line granddaughter of Ferdinand and Anna. As a result, after 1598, all Habsburg scions descended from the Babenberg Dukes.

== See also ==
- Popponids
- List of rulers of Austria
- Slavnik's dynasty
- House of Henneberg - Henneberg portion of Franconian Babenbergs and early Babenberg origins
- Senior Capets
- March of Neustria
- Duke of Brittany
