= List of rulers of Austria =

Margraves, Dukes, Archdukes and Emperors of Austria
- Archducal Coat of arms

Details
- Style: Archduchy period: Royal Highness; Imperial Highness
- First monarch: Leopold I (as margrave)
- Last monarch: Charles I (as emperor)
- Formed: c. 960
- Abolished: 12 November 1918
- Residences: Hofburg, Vienna (ducal period onwards)

From c. 960 until 1246, the Margraviate of Austria and its successor, the Duchy of Austria, was ruled by the House of Babenberg. At that time, Austria was part of the Holy Roman Empire. From 1246 until 1918, the duchy and its successor, the Archduchy of Austria, was ruled by the House of Habsburg, which also took the title of Holy Roman Emperor in 1452. Following the Empire's dissolution in 1806, the Austrian rulers adopted the title of Emperor of Austria. Following the defeat and dissolution of Austria-Hungary in World War I, the titles were abolished or fell into abeyance with the establishment of the modern Republic of Austria.

== Margraves and Dukes of Austria ==
The March or Margraviate of Austria, originally known as Marcha Orientalis, was formed c. 960 out of the lands of the former Carolingian March of Pannonia following the reconquest of that territory by the German king, and later Holy Roman Emperor, Otto the Great. The oldest attestation of the name "Austria" dates back to 996, where the written name ostarrichi ("eastern realm") occurs in a document transferring land in present-day Austria to a Bavarian monastery.

Name	Birth Death	Reign	Ruling part	Consort	Notes
Burkhard	Unknown lifespan	c. 960 976	March of Austria	Unknown	Mentioned in 970 as Margrave of the Marchia Orientalis. Was deposed by Emperor Otto II after joining the uprising of Duke Henry II of Bavaria. Dates uncertain.

=== House of Babenberg ===
The March of Austria was given to the Babengers in 976. In 1156, the Privilegium Minus elevated the march to a duchy, independent of the Duchy of Bavaria.

Name	Birth Death	Reign	Ruling part	Consort(s) Child(ren)	Notes
Leopold I the Illustrious	c. 940; Son of Berthold of Nordgau or Arnulf of Bavaria 10 July 994; Würzburg aged 53–54	c. 21 July 976 10 July 994	March of Austria	Richardis of Sualafeldgau nine children	Founder of the Babenbergs. First mentioned on 21 July 976 and likely appointed Margrave that day or shortly before.
Henry I the Strong	c. 965 (?); First son of Leopold I and Richardis of Sualafeldgau 23 June 1018 aged 53–54	10 July 994 23 June 1018	March of Austria	Unmarried	In his reign (996), the name Ostarrichi (later Osterreich, Austria) appeared for the first time to designate the land he ruled.
Adalbert I the Victorious	c. 985; Third son of Leopold I and Richardis of Sualafeldgau 26 May 1055; Melk aged 69–70	23 June 1018 26 May 1055	March of Austria	Glismod of West-Saxony no children Frozza Orseolo c.1025? two children	Expanded his Bavarian margraviate to the Morava and Leitha rivers.
Ernest the Brave	1027; Son of Adalbert I and Frozza Orseolo 10 June 1075 aged 47–48	26 May 1055 10 June 1075	March of Austria	Adelaide of Eilenburg; 1060 three children Swanhilde of Ungarnmark; 1072 no children	Expanded his Bavarian margraviate to the Morava and Leitha rivers.
Leopold II the Fair	1050; Son of Ernest and Adelaide of Eilenburg 12 October 1095; Gars am Kamp aged 44–45	10 June 1075 12 October 1095	March of Austria	Ida of Formbach-Ratelnberg; 1065 eight children	Supported the Gregorian Reforms, and was an active opponent to Henry IV, Holy Roman Emperor during the Investiture Controversy.
Leopold III the Saint	1073; Gars am Kamp; Son of Leopold II and Ida of Formbach-Ratelnberg 15 November 1136; Klosterneuburg aged 62–63	12 October 1095 15 November 1136	March of Austria	Maria of Perg no children Agnes of Germany; 1106 nineteen children	His second marriage brought the margraviate of Austria closer to the Imperial family, which raised the importance of the Babenbergs. Consequently, more royal rights were granted to Austria.
Adalbert II the Pious	1106; First son of Leopold III and Agnes of Germany 9 November 1137 aged 30–31	15 November 1136 9 November 1137	March of Austria	Adelaide of Poland; 1128/29 no children Hedwig of Hungary; 1132 no children	Usually not counted as margrave, despite being cited as so as early as 1119. Nevertheless, it's possible that he ruled for a year, or at least as claimant to his younger brother Leopold. If he ruled, he left no children. Knighted in 1125
Leopold IV the Generous	1108; Third son of Leopold III and Agnes of Germany – 18 October 1141; Niederalteich aged 32–33	9 November 1137 18 October 1141	March of Austria	Maria of Bohemia; 28 September 1138 no children	Also Duke of Bavaria, title given to him after his struggles with the House of Welf.
Henry II; Jasomirgott	1107; Second son of Leopold III and Agnes of Germany 13 January 1177; Vienna aged 69–70	18 October 1141 13 January 1177	March of Austria (until 1156) Duchy of Austria (from 1156)	Gertrude of Süpplingenburg; 1 May 1142 one child Theodora Komnene; 1148 three children	Succeeded his younger brother in Austria and also as Duke of Bavaria. Moved his capital to Vienna. In 1156, Austria was raised to a Duchy.
Leopold V the Virtuous	1157; First son of Henry II and Theodora Komnene 31 December 1194; Graz aged 36–37	13 January 1177 31 December 1194	Duchy of Austria	Helena of Hungary; 1174 four children	Children of Henry II, divided Austria: Leopold V kept the main duchy and annexed the Duchy of Styria to his domain in 1192.
Henry I the Elder	1158; Second son of Henry II and Theodora Komnene 31 August 1223 aged 64–65	13 January 1177 31 August 1223	Duchy of Mödling	Richeza of Bohemia; 1177 one child	Leopold gave his brother Henry the so-called Duchy of Mödling (title Henry used from 1205), which spanned from Liesing to Piesting and Bruck an der Leitha. Henry I and his descendants became mostly interested in the arts.
Frederick I the Catholic	1175; First son of Leopold V and Helena of Hungary 16 April 1198; The Holy Land aged 22–23	31 December 1194 16 April 1198	Duchy of Austria	Unmarried	Left no children.
Leopold VI the Glorious	15 October 1176; Second son of Leopold V and Helena of Hungary 28 July 1230; San Germano aged 53	16 April 1198 28 July 1230	Duchy of Austria	Theodora Angelina; 1203 seven children	
Henry II the Profane	1208; First son of Leopold I and Theodora Angelina 29 November 1228 aged 19–20	31 August 1223 29 November 1228	Duchy of Mödling	Agnes of Thuringia; 29 November 1225; Nuremberg one child	Nephew of Henry I, apparently succeeded him as ruler, preceding his cousin (Henry I's son). He is referenced as Heinricus iuvenis dux who died in 1227, and Henrici de Medlico (Henry of Mödling).
Henry III the Younger	1182; Son of Henry I and Richeza of Bohemia 1236 aged 53–54	29 November 1228 1236	Duchy of Mödling	Unmarried	After his death the duchy reverted to his cousin Gertrude, daughter of Henry II.
Frederick II the Quarrelsome	25 April 1211; Wiener Neustadt; Second son of Leopold I and Theodora Angelina 15 June 1246; Leitha aged 35	28 July 1230 15 June 1246	Duchy of Austria	Eudokia Sophia Laskarina Angelina no children Agnes of Merania; 1229 no children	His troublesome marriages with no children opened a succession crisis in Austria.
Gertrude	1226; Daughter of Henry II, Duke of Mödling and Agnes of Thuringia 24 April 1288 aged 61–62	1236 4 October 1250	Duchy of Mödling	Vladislaus of Bohemia; 1246 no children Herman VI, Margrave of Baden; 1248 two children Roman Danylovych; 1252 one child	Heiress of Mödling. After her cousin's death in 1246, she was the first to claim the duchy. She was associated with her first two husbands. However, as Herman of Baden failed to defeat the opposition of Austrian nobility, her rule weakened substantially, giving them minimal control over the duchies. Her first refusal of a third marriage with the brother of William II of Holland, combined with the occupation of Austria by her cousin Margaret and Ottokar of Bohemia in 1252, halted her claims. Although she was even given a part of Styria in 1254, she did not forswear her claim; her territorial portion was taken away from her in 1267.
Gertrude	1226; Daughter of Henry II, Duke of Mödling and Agnes of Thuringia 24 April 1288 aged 61–62	15 June 1246 4 October 1250 1254–1267	Duchy of Austria (in only part of Styria in 1254–67)	Vladislaus of Bohemia; 1246 no children Herman VI, Margrave of Baden; 1248 two children Roman Danylovych; 1252 one child	
Vladislaus of Bohemia	1227; Son of Wenceslaus I of Bohemia and Kunigunde of Hohenstaufen 3 January 1247; Leitha aged 19–20	15 June 1246 3 January 1247	Duchy of Austria (claimant as consort)	Gertrude; 1246 no children	
Herman VI of Baden	c.1226 Son of Herman V, Margrave of Baden and Irmengard of the Palatinate 4 October 1250 aged 23–24	1248 4 October 1250	Duchy of Austria (claimant as consort)	Gertrude; 1248 two children	
Frederick I of Baden	1249; Alland; Son of Herman VI, Margrave of Baden and Gertrude 29 October 1268; Naples aged 18–19	1254 1267	Duchy of Austria (claimant as heir; in only part of Styria)	Unmarried	
Margaret	1204; Daughter of Leopold VI and Theodora Angelina 29 October 1266; Krumau am Kamp aged 61–62	6 May 1252 29 October 1266	Duchy of Austria (from 1261 only in Krumau am Kamp)	Henry (VII) of Germany; 29 November 1225; Nuremberg two children Ottokar II of Bohemia; 11 February 1252; Hainburg an der Donau (annulled 1261) no children	Margaret and her husband, future King of Bohemia, invaded Austria in 1252 and were successfully proclaimed Dukes of Austria. After the annulment of their marriage, Margaret retired and Ottokar continued his rule until 1276, when he signed away his claims in Austria in favor of Rudolph of Habsburg. The matter would be settled with his defeat and death at the Battle on the Marchfeld (1278).
Premislaus Ottokar II of Bohemia	1233; Městec Králové; Son of Wenceslaus I of Bohemia and Kunigunde of Hohenstaufen 26 August 1278; Dürnkrut aged 44–45	6 May 1252 1261	Duchy of Austria (claimant as consort)	Margaret; 11 February 1252; Hainburg an der Donau (annulled 1261) no children Kunigunda Rostislavna of Halych; 25 October 1261; Pressburg three children	Margaret and her husband, future King of Bohemia, invaded Austria in 1252 and were successfully proclaimed Dukes of Austria. After the annulment of their marriage, Margaret retired and Ottokar continued his rule until 1276, when he signed away his claims in Austria in favor of Rudolph of Habsburg. The matter would be settled with his defeat and death at the Battle on the Marchfeld (1278).
Premislaus Ottokar II of Bohemia	1233; Městec Králové; Son of Wenceslaus I of Bohemia and Kunigunde of Hohenstaufen 26 August 1278; Dürnkrut aged 44–45	1261 November 1276	Duchy of Austria	Margaret; 11 February 1252; Hainburg an der Donau (annulled 1261) no children Kunigunda Rostislavna of Halych; 25 October 1261; Pressburg three children	Margaret and her husband, future King of Bohemia, invaded Austria in 1252 and were successfully proclaimed Dukes of Austria. After the annulment of their marriage, Margaret retired and Ottokar continued his rule until 1276, when he signed away his claims in Austria in favor of Rudolph of Habsburg. The matter would be settled with his defeat and death at the Battle on the Marchfeld (1278).

=== House of Habsburg ===
Count Rudolf of Habsburg, elected as king of Germany (1273), was able during 1276–1278 to decisively defeat his main rival, the Bohemian king Ottokar II, and to regain his Austrian domains back for the Empire. By his imperial authority, Rudolf later (1282) invested his sons Albrecht and Rudolf with the duchies of Austria and Styria, thereby securing them for the House of Habsburg. Austria remained under Habsburg rule for more than 600 years, forming the core of the Habsburg monarchy and the present-day country of Austria.

The most important Austrian rulers until the Victory at Vienna in 1683 are described in the book Symmetria iuridico Austriaca.

==== Possessions (and partitions) of Austria ====
Duchy of Austria (1291–1379); Includes the Duchies of Styria and Carinthia, and the March of Carniola from 1358; Includes the County of Tyrol from 1363; Carniola was raised to Duchy of Carniola in 1364; Partitioned by the Treaty of Neuberg in 1379
Duchy of Lower Austria (1379–1457)	Duchies of Inner and Further Austria (with Styria, Carinthia, Carniola and Tyrol) (1379–1406)		
Duchy of Lower Austria (1379–1457)	Duchy of Inner Austria (with Styria, Carinthia and Carniola) (1406–1453)	Duchy of Further Austria (1406–1439)	County of Tyrol (1406–1439)
Duchy of Lower Austria (1379–1457)	Duchy of Inner Austria (with Styria, Carinthia and Carniola) (1406–1453)	Duchy of Further Austria (with Tyrol) (1439–1453)	
Raised to: Archduchy of Inner Austria (1453–1490)		Raised to: Archduchy of Further Austria (1453–1490)	
Archduchy of Austria (Inner Austrian line) (1490–1564)
Archduchy of Lower and Upper Austria (1564–1619)	Archduchy of Inner Austria (1564–1619)	Archduchy of Further Austria (with Tyrol) (1564–1619)	
Archduchy of Austria (1619–1623)
Archduchy of Lower and Inner Austria (1623–1665)		Archduchy of Further Austria (1623–1665)	
Archduchy of Austria (Lower/Inner Austrian line) (1665–1804)

==== Table of rulers ====
Name	Birth Death	Reign	Ruling part	Consort(s) Child(ren)	Notes
Rudolph I	1 May 1218; Sasbach am Kaiserstuhl; Son of Albert IV, Count of Habsburg and Hedwig of Kyburg 15 July 1291; Speyer aged 73	November 1276 December 1282	Duchy of Austria	Gertrude Anna of Hohenberg; 1253; Elsass ten children Isabella of Burgundy; 6 February 1284; Remiremont no children	Brought the rule of Austria to the Habsburgs after definitively defeating Ottokar II of Bohemia between 1276 and 1278.
Albert I	July 1255; Vienna; Eldest son of Rudolf I and Gertrude of Hohenberg 1 May 1308; Windisch aged 52	December 1282 1 May 1308	Duchy of Austria	Elisabeth of Gorizia-Tyrol; 20 December 1274; Vienna twelve children	Sons of Rudolf I, Albert I and Rudolf II, co-ruled in Austria only one year (1282–83) when the sole rule was entrusted by the Treaty of Rheinfelden to Albert alone according to the principle of primogeniture. Albert was elected as king of Germany in 1298, and that same year he associated his own eldest son, Rudolf III in Austria. Rudolf was also elected King of Bohemia in 1306, but predeceased his father, dying in the following year. Albert himself was assassinated by his nephew John Parricida.
Rudolf II the Debonair	July 1270; Rheinfelden; Third son of Rudolph I and Gertrude of Hohenberg 10 May 1290; Prague aged 20	December 1282 1283	Duchy of Austria	Agnes of Bohemia; March 1289; Prague one child	Sons of Rudolf I, Albert I and Rudolf II, co-ruled in Austria only one year (1282–83) when the sole rule was entrusted by the Treaty of Rheinfelden to Albert alone according to the principle of primogeniture. Albert was elected as king of Germany in 1298, and that same year he associated his own eldest son, Rudolf III in Austria. Rudolf was also elected King of Bohemia in 1306, but predeceased his father, dying in the following year. Albert himself was assassinated by his nephew John Parricida.
Rudolf III the Good	c. 1281; Vienna; Eldest son of Albert I and Elisabeth of Gorizia-Tyrol 3/4 July 1307; Horažďovice aged 26	21 November 1298 3/4 July 1307	Duchy of Austria	Blanche of France; 25 May 1300 one child Elisabeth Richeza of Poland; 16 October 1306; Prague no children	Sons of Rudolf I, Albert I and Rudolf II, co-ruled in Austria only one year (1282–83) when the sole rule was entrusted by the Treaty of Rheinfelden to Albert alone according to the principle of primogeniture. Albert was elected as king of Germany in 1298, and that same year he associated his own eldest son, Rudolf III in Austria. Rudolf was also elected King of Bohemia in 1306, but predeceased his father, dying in the following year. Albert himself was assassinated by his nephew John Parricida.
Frederick I the Fair	c. 1289; Vienna; Second son of Albert I and Elisabeth of Gorizia-Tyrol 13 January 1330; Gutenstein aged 41	1 May 1308 13 January 1330	Duchy of Austria	Isabella of Aragon; 11 May 1315; Ravensburg three children	Younger brothers of Rudolf III, and co-rulers in Austria and Styria. Leopold, despite being younger than Frederick, was the one who primarily inherited the County of Habsburg, the oldest land of the family, and it was only after his death (1326) that Frederick came to rule there. In 1314, Frederick was elected King of the Romans, firstly as rival of Louis IV, Holy Roman Emperor, and then accepting co-rulership.
Leopold I the Glorious	4 August 1290; Vienna; Third son of Albert I and Elisabeth of Gorizia-Tyrol 28 February 1326; Strassburg aged 35	1 May 1308 28 February 1326	Duchy of Austria	Catherine of Savoy; 26 May 1315; Basel two children	Younger brothers of Rudolf III, and co-rulers in Austria and Styria. Leopold, despite being younger than Frederick, was the one who primarily inherited the County of Habsburg, the oldest land of the family, and it was only after his death (1326) that Frederick came to rule there. In 1314, Frederick was elected King of the Romans, firstly as rival of Louis IV, Holy Roman Emperor, and then accepting co-rulership.
Albert II the Wise	12 December 1298; Habsburg Castle; Fourth son of Albert I and Elisabeth of Gorizia-Tyrol 16 August 1358; Vienna aged 59	13 January 1330 16 August 1358	Duchy of Austria	Joanna of Pfirt; 15 February 1324; Vienna six children	Younger brothers of the predecessors, and co-rulers. Albert established the primogeniture law into their domains. He also brought Carinthia and Carniola into Habsburg rule and laid an unsuccessful siege to Zürich. Otto administered the Swabian Habsburg lands. Otto's minor sons, Frederick (II) and Leopold (II), succeeded him in the co-rulership as titular dukes (1339–1344).
Otto I the Merry	23 July 1301; Vienna; Seventh son of Albert I and Elisabeth of Gorizia-Tyrol 17 February 1339; Neuberg an der Mürz aged 37	13 January 1330 17 February 1339	Duchy of Austria	Elisabeth of Bavaria; 15 May 1325; Straubing two children Anne of Bohemia; 16 February 1335; Znaim no children	Younger brothers of the predecessors, and co-rulers. Albert established the primogeniture law into their domains. He also brought Carinthia and Carniola into Habsburg rule and laid an unsuccessful siege to Zürich. Otto administered the Swabian Habsburg lands. Otto's minor sons, Frederick (II) and Leopold (II), succeeded him in the co-rulership as titular dukes (1339–1344).
Rudolf IV the Founder	1 November 1339; Vienna; Eldest son of Albert II the Wise and Joanna of Pfirt 27 July 1365; Milan aged 25	16 August 1358 27 July 1365	Duchy of Austria	Catherine of Bohemia; 13 July 1356; Vienna no children	After the unchanging of privileges for the Habsburgs in the decree of the Golden Bull in 1356, Rudolf gave the order to draw up the Privilegium Maius, a fake document to empower the Austrian rulers. He was the first to style himself as "Archduke", a title which was only made official in 1453. Rudolf also brought Tyrol into the Habsburg domain.
The Privilegium Maius, fabricated by Rudolf in 1359, attempted to invest the Dukes of Austria with the special position of an "Archduke". This title was frequently used by Ernest the Iron and other Dukes but not recognized by other princes of the Holy Roman Empire until Frederick V became Emperor and confirmed the Privilegium in 1453. After the death of Rudolf in 1365, his brothers Albert and Leopold succeeded him together, but divided their possessions between them in the Treaty of Neuberg of 1379: Albert founded the Albertinian Line, who received the Duchy of Austria, later called Lower Austria (not to be confused with the namesake modern state); Leopold founded the Leopoldinian Line, who received the duchies of Styria, Carinthia and Carniola (the group of lands also called Inner Austria), the County of Tyrol and Further Austria.
Albert III the Pigtail	9 September 1349; Vienna; Third son of Albert II the Wise and Joanna of Pfirt 29 August 1395; Laxenburg aged 45	29 July 1365 25 September 1379	Duchy of Austria	Elisabeth of Bohemia after 19 March 1366; Vienna no children Beatrice of Nuremberg; 4 March 1375; Vienna one child	Brothers of the predecessor, divided their domains in 1379. Leopold himself lost his life fighting in the Battle of Sempach (1386), a turning point that established the growth of the Swiss Confederacy and the effective decline of Habsburg power in their Swiss homeland.
Albert III the Pigtail	9 September 1349; Vienna; Third son of Albert II the Wise and Joanna of Pfirt 29 August 1395; Laxenburg aged 45	25 September 1379 29 August 1395	Duchy of Lower Austria	Elisabeth of Bohemia after 19 March 1366; Vienna no children Beatrice of Nuremberg; 4 March 1375; Vienna one child	Brothers of the predecessor, divided their domains in 1379. Leopold himself lost his life fighting in the Battle of Sempach (1386), a turning point that established the growth of the Swiss Confederacy and the effective decline of Habsburg power in their Swiss homeland.
Leopold III the Just	1 November 1351; Vienna; Fourth son of Albert II the Wise and Joanna of Pfirt 9 July 1386; Sempach aged 34	29 July 1365 25 September 1379	Duchy of Austria	Viridis Visconti; 23 February 1365; Vienna six children	Brothers of the predecessor, divided their domains in 1379. Leopold himself lost his life fighting in the Battle of Sempach (1386), a turning point that established the growth of the Swiss Confederacy and the effective decline of Habsburg power in their Swiss homeland.
Leopold III the Just	1 November 1351; Vienna; Fourth son of Albert II the Wise and Joanna of Pfirt 9 July 1386; Sempach aged 34	25 September 1379 9 July 1386	Duchies of Inner and Further Austria with County of Tyrol	Viridis Visconti; 23 February 1365; Vienna six children	Brothers of the predecessor, divided their domains in 1379. Leopold himself lost his life fighting in the Battle of Sempach (1386), a turning point that established the growth of the Swiss Confederacy and the effective decline of Habsburg power in their Swiss homeland.
William the Courteous	c. 1370; Vienna; Eldest son of Leopold the Just and Viridis Visconti 15 July 1406; Vienna aged 36	9 July 1386 15 July 1406	Duchies of Inner and Further Austria with County of Tyrol	Joan II of Naples; 13 November 1401; Vienna no children	Co-ruled with his brother Leopold IV. Also held regency in Lower Austria 1404–1406.
Leopold IV the Fat	c. 1371; Vienna; Second son of Leopold the Just and Viridis Visconti 3 June 1411; Vienna aged 40	9 July 1386 15 July 1406	Duchies of Inner and Further Austria with County of Tyrol	Catherine of Burgundy; 15 August 1393; Vienna no children	Also held regency in Lower Austria 1404–1411. After the partition of 1406, kept Further Austria.
Leopold IV the Fat	c. 1371; Vienna; Second son of Leopold the Just and Viridis Visconti 3 June 1411; Vienna aged 40	15 July 1406 3 June 1411	Duchy of Further Austria	Catherine of Burgundy; 15 August 1393; Vienna no children	Also held regency in Lower Austria 1404–1411. After the partition of 1406, kept Further Austria.
Albert IV the Patient	19 September 1377; Vienna; Only son of Albert the Pigtail and Beatrice of Nuremberg 14 September 1404; Klosterneuburg aged 26	29 August 1395 14 September 1404	Duchy of Lower Austria	Joanna Sophia of Bavaria; 24 April 1390; Vienna two children	His rule was marked by tensions and conflicts with the Leopoldinian line and the Luxemburg dynasty.
Regencies of William, Duke of Austria and Leopold IV, Duke of Austria (1404–1411)					Succeeded as a minor, under guardianship of his Leopoldinian uncles. He was elected, in 1437 38, as King of Bohemia and King of Hungary, and also as King of Germany, beginning a three centuries long succession of Habsburg rulers as Kings of the Romans and Holy Roman Emperors.
Albert V the Magnanimous	16 August 1397; Vienna; Only son of Albert IV and Joanna Sophia of Bavaria 27 October 1439; Neszmély aged 42	14 September 1404 27 October 1439	Duchy of Lower Austria	Elizabeth of Luxembourg; 26 April 1422; Vienna three children	Succeeded as a minor, under guardianship of his Leopoldinian uncles. He was elected, in 1437 38, as King of Bohemia and King of Hungary, and also as King of Germany, beginning a three centuries long succession of Habsburg rulers as Kings of the Romans and Holy Roman Emperors.
In 1406, after the death of William, the living brothers of the Leopoldinian Line made a new division of their territories: Leopold kept Further Austria, to be inherited by his brother Frederick after his death; Ernest founded the Elder Leopoldinian Line, who received Inner Austria; Frederick founded the Junior Leopoldian Line, who received the county of Tyrol and then Further Austria.
Ernest the Iron	c. 1377; Bruck an der Mur; Third son of Leopold the Just and Viridis Visconti 10 June 1424; Bruck an der Mur aged 47	15 July 1406 10 June 1424	Duchy of Inner Austria	Margaret of Pomerania; 14 January 1392; Bruck an der Mur no children Cymburgis of Masovia; 25 January 1412; Kraków nine children	In 1414, he became the last Duke to be enthroned according to Carantanian traditional rite at the Prince's Stone in Carinthia, and from that time on called himself Archduke. Beside Rudolf IV, he was the only one who used the title before it became official in 1453.
Frederick IV of the Empty Pockets	c. 1382; Fourth son of Leopold the Just and Viridis Visconti 24 June 1439; Innsbruck aged 57	15 July 1406 3 June 1411	County of Tyrol	Elisabeth of the Palatinate; 24 December 1407; Innsbruck one child Anna of Brunswick-Wolfenbüttel; 11 June 1411; Innsbruck four children	Also held regency in Inner Austria 1424–1435. Because he sided with Antipope John XXIII, the Council of Constance stripped him of the remaining important Swiss possessions of the family, which went to the Swiss Confederacy.
Frederick IV of the Empty Pockets	c. 1382; Fourth son of Leopold the Just and Viridis Visconti 24 June 1439; Innsbruck aged 57	3 June 1411 24 June 1439	County of Tyrol with Further Austria	Elisabeth of the Palatinate; 24 December 1407; Innsbruck one child Anna of Brunswick-Wolfenbüttel; 11 June 1411; Innsbruck four children	Also held regency in Inner Austria 1424–1435. Because he sided with Antipope John XXIII, the Council of Constance stripped him of the remaining important Swiss possessions of the family, which went to the Swiss Confederacy.
Vacant 1439–1440
Regency of Frederick V, Duke of Austria (1440–1452)					Succeeded as a minor, under the guardianship of his Ernestine cousin. His death without descendants ended the Albertinian line. The domains which he inherited in Bohemia and Hungary were lost, and were only recovered during the reign of Ferdinand I, Holy Roman Emperor.
Ladislaus the Posthumous	22 February 1440; Komárom; Only son of Albert V and Elizabeth of Luxembourg 23 November 1457; Prague aged 17	22 February 1440 23 November 1457	Duchy of Lower Austria (1440–1453) Archduchy of Lower Austria (1453–1457)	Unmarried	Succeeded as a minor, under the guardianship of his Ernestine cousin. His death without descendants ended the Albertinian line. The domains which he inherited in Bohemia and Hungary were lost, and were only recovered during the reign of Ferdinand I, Holy Roman Emperor.
Lower Austria annexed to Inner Austria
Regency of Frederick V, Duke of Austria (1439–1446)					In 1490 he abdicated his control over his territories, giving way for the reunification of Austria.
Sigismund the Rich	26 October 1427; Innsbruck; Second son of Frederick IV and Anna of Brunswick 4 March 1496; Innsbruck aged 68	24 June 1439 1490	Duchy of Further Austria with County of Tyrol (1439–1453) Archduchy of Further Austria with County of Tyrol (1453–1490)	Eleanor of Scotland; 12 February 1449; Innsbruck one child Katharina of Saxony; 24 February 1484; Innsbruck no children	In 1490 he abdicated his control over his territories, giving way for the reunification of Austria.
Further Austria and Tyrol annexed to Inner Austria
Regency of Frederick IV, Duke of Austria (1424–1435)					Sons of Ernest I, ruled jointly. Occasionally, Albert revolted against Frederick, occupying until his death the lands known today as Upper Austria and Lower Austria. On his part, Frederick was elected, between 1440 and 1452, King of the Romans and Holy Roman Emperor as Frederick III. With this dignity, he conceded and made official, in 1453, the Habsburg title of Archduke. He officially elevated the Duchy into an Archduchy, which he came to inherit a few years later. Despite having reunited all of Austria, Frederick's rule wasn't always uncontested: in 1485–1490, Matthias Corvinus, king of Hungary, occupied the proper Duchies of Austria and Styria, claiming the title Archduke of Austria.
Frederick V the Peaceful	21 September 1415; Innsbruck; First son of Ernest and Cymburgis of Masovia 19 August 1493; Linz aged 77	10 June 1424 1490	Duchy of Inner Austria (1424–1453) Archduchy of Inner Austria (1453–1490)	Eleanor of Portugal; 16 March 1452; Rome five children	
Frederick V the Peaceful	21 September 1415; Innsbruck; First son of Ernest and Cymburgis of Masovia 19 August 1493; Linz aged 77	1490 19 August 1493	Archduchy of Austria	Eleanor of Portugal; 16 March 1452; Rome five children	
Albert VI the Prodigal	12 September 1418; Vienna; Third son of Ernest and Cymburgis of Masovia 2 December 1463; Vienna aged 45	10 June 1424 2 December 1463	Duchy of Inner Austria (1424–1453) Archduchy of Inner Austria (1453–1463)	Mechthild of the Palatinate; 1452; Vienna no children	
Maximilian I the Last Knight	22 March 1459; Wiener Neustadt; Second son of Frederick V and Eleanor of Portugal 12 January 1519; Wels aged 59	19 August 1493 12 January 1519	Archduchy of Austria	Mary of Burgundy; 18 August 1477; Ghent three children Anne of Brittany; 18 December 1490; Rennes no children Bianca Maria Sforza; 16 March 1494; Hall in Tirol no children	In 1490, he reconquered lost Austrian lands after Matthias Corvinus's death and persuaded his cousin Sigismund to cede Tyrol to him. Appointed King of the Romans in 1486 and crowned Holy Roman Emperor in 1508. His first marriage allowed him to extend Habsburg domain over the Low Countries.
Charles I	24 February 1500; Ghent; Eldest son of Philip I of Castile and Joanna of Castile 21 September 1558; Yuste aged 58	12 January 1519 21 April 1521/3 August 1556	Archduchy of Austria	Isabella of Portugal; 10 March 1526; Seville seven children	Grandson of his predecessor. Through his mother he gained, in 1516, the recently unified Kingdom of Spain. He founded a Spanish branch of the Habsburgs that reigned until 1700. In 1519, he inherited the Austrian Archduchy, and was the first solely elected (not crowned) King of the Romans and Holy Roman Emperor as Charles V. In 1521, he abdicated from Austria. He was succeeded in Austria by his brother, but continued to style himself as Archduke of Austria and being his brother's overlord until 1556. In this year, Charles abdicated control over all his possessions and retired to the Monastery of Yuste.
Ferdinand I under Charles I (1521–1556)	10 March 1503; Alcalá de Henares; Second son of Philip I of Castile and Joanna of Castile 25 July 1564; Vienna aged 61	21 April 1521 25 July 1564	Archduchy of Austria	Anne of Bohemia and Hungary; 25 May 1521; Linz fifteen children	Brother of the predecessor. While Charles I's son Philip II of Spain inherited the "Western" possessions (Low Countries, Spain with ultramarine lands, and Italian states), Ferdinand inherited the rest (Austrian possessions), while gaining the kingdoms of Hungary and Bohemia, and came to be elected King of the Romans and Holy Roman Emperor in 1556, after his brother's abdication.
In 1564, after Ferdinand I's death, the Archduchy was once more divided between his sons: Maximilian received Austria proper, known then as Lower and Upper Austria; Ferdinand received Tyrol and Further Austria, which after his death with no descendants passed to the elder Austrian line; Charles received Inner Austria (the duchies of Styria, Carinthia and Carniola).
Maximilian II	31 July 1527; Vienna; Eldest son of Ferdinand I and Anne of Bohemia and Hungary 12 October 1576; Regensburg aged 49	25 July 1564 12 October 1576	Archduchy of Lower and Upper Austria	Maria of Spain; 13 September 1548; Valladolid sixteen children	Maximilian, as the eldest son, was elected King of the Romans and Holy Roman Emperor in 1564, and inherited also the kingdoms of Hungary and Bohemia.
Ferdinand II	14 June 1529; Linz; Second son of Ferdinand I and Anne of Bohemia and Hungary 24 January 1595; Innsbruck aged 65	25 July 1564 24 January 1595	Archduchy of Further Austria with County of Tyrol	Philippine Welser ca. 1576 four children Anne Juliana Gonzaga; 14 May 1582; Innsbruck three children	Had descendants, but from his morganatic marriage, making them unsuitable for succession; his lands were eventually inherited by the senior Austrian line.
Charles II	3 June 1540; Vienna; Fourth son of Ferdinand I and Anne of Bohemia and Hungary 10 July 1590; Graz aged 50	25 July 1564 10 July 1590	Archduchy of Inner Austria	Maria Anna of Bavaria (I); 26 August 1571; Vienna fifteen children	Unlike his brother Maximilian, Charles was Catholic and promoted the Counter-Reformation in his domains.
Rudolf V	18 July 1552; Vienna; Second son of Maximilian II and Maria of Spain 20 January 1612; Prague aged 59	12 October 1576 1608	Archduchy of Lower and Upper Austria	Unmarried	Also Holy Roman Emperor as Rudolf II, and King of Bohemia and Hungary. He was a patron of the arts, known for his support of Mannerist art.
Matthias	24 February 1557; Vienna; Fourth son of Maximilian II and Maria of Spain 20 March 1619; Vienna aged 62	24 January 1595 26 June 1612 2 November 1618 20 March 1619	Archduchy of Further Austria with County of Tyrol	Anna of Tyrol; 4 December 1611; Vienna no children	Also Holy Roman Emperor and King of Bohemia and Hungary.
Matthias	24 February 1557; Vienna; Fourth son of Maximilian II and Maria of Spain 20 March 1619; Vienna aged 62	1608 20 March 1619	Archduchy of Lower and Upper Austria (with County of Tyrol 1612–1618)	Anna of Tyrol; 4 December 1611; Vienna no children	Also Holy Roman Emperor and King of Bohemia and Hungary.
Maximilian III	12 October 1558; Vienna; Sixth son of Maximilian II and Maria of Spain 2 November 1618; Vienna aged 60	26 June 1612 2 November 1618	Archduchy of Further Austria	Unmarried (served as Grand Master of the Teutonic Order)	In 1587 stood as a candidate for the throne of the Polish Lithuanian Commonwealth. He also held the regency of Lower and Upper Austria 1593–1595.
Albert VII	13 November 1559; Wiener Neustadt; Fifth son of Maximilian II and Maria of Spain 13 July 1621; Brussels aged 61	20 March 9 October 1619	Archduchy of Lower and Upper Austria	Infanta Isabella Clara Eugenia of Spain; 18 April 1599; Valencia no children	Also Viceroy of Portugal under Philip II of Spain, and ruler of the Low Countries (1598–1621). Ruled a few months as archduke, before abdicating. His abdication resulted in a new reunion of Austria.
In 1619, Ferdinand II, Holy Roman Emperor (Ferdinand III of Austria) reunited the Archduchy. During the Thirty Years' War, he felt the need to divide the land once more: Ferdinand kept Lower and Inner Austria; Leopold, Ferdinand's brother, received Upper Austria (with Further Austria and Tyrol).
Regencies of Ernest of Austria (1590–1593) and Maximilian III, Archduke of Austria (1593–1595)					Also Holy Roman Emperor (1619–1637) as Ferdinand II, and King of Hungary and Bohemia. In 1619, he reunited Austria, but divided it again.
Ferdinand III	9 July 1578; Graz; Second son of Charles II and Maria Anna of Bavaria (I) 15 February 1637; Vienna aged 58	10 July 1590 9 October 1619	Archduchy of Inner Austria	Maria Anna of Bavaria (II); 23 April 1600; Graz seven children Eleonora Gonzaga (I); 2 February 1622; Innsbruck no children	Also Holy Roman Emperor (1619–1637) as Ferdinand II, and King of Hungary and Bohemia. In 1619, he reunited Austria, but divided it again.
Ferdinand III	9 July 1578; Graz; Second son of Charles II and Maria Anna of Bavaria (I) 15 February 1637; Vienna aged 58	9 October 1619 1623	Archduchy of Austria	Maria Anna of Bavaria (II); 23 April 1600; Graz seven children Eleonora Gonzaga (I); 2 February 1622; Innsbruck no children	Also Holy Roman Emperor (1619–1637) as Ferdinand II, and King of Hungary and Bohemia. In 1619, he reunited Austria, but divided it again.
Ferdinand III	9 July 1578; Graz; Second son of Charles II and Maria Anna of Bavaria (I) 15 February 1637; Vienna aged 58	1623 15 February 1637	Archduchy of Lower and Inner Austria	Maria Anna of Bavaria (II); 23 April 1600; Graz seven children Eleonora Gonzaga (I); 2 February 1622; Innsbruck no children	Also Holy Roman Emperor (1619–1637) as Ferdinand II, and King of Hungary and Bohemia. In 1619, he reunited Austria, but divided it again.
Leopold V	9 October 1586; Graz; Fifth son of Charles II and Maria Anna of Bavaria 13 September 1632; Schwaz aged 45	1623 13 September 1632	Archduchy of Further Austria	Claudia de' Medici; 19 April 1626; Innsbruck five children	When he was chosen as archduke regnant, he abdicated his ecclesiastical status (as he previously held the Bishoprics of Passau and Strasbourg) in order to get married and have children.
Regency of Claudia de' Medici (1632–1646)					The male line of his father died out soon after Ferdinand Charles' own death.
Ferdinand Charles	17 May 1628; Innsbruck; Eldest son of Leopold V and Claudia de' Medici 30 December 1662; Kaltern aged 34	13 September 1632 30 December 1662	Archduchy of Further Austria	Anna de' Medici; 10 June 1646; Innsbruck two children	The male line of his father died out soon after Ferdinand Charles' own death.
Ferdinand IV	13 July 1608; Graz; Third son of Ferdinand III and Maria Anna of Bavaria (II) 2 April 1657; Vienna aged 48	15 February 1637 2 April 1657	Archduchy of Lower and Inner Austria	Maria Anna of Spain; 20 February 1631; Vienna six children Maria Leopoldine of Austria; 2 July 1648; Linz one child Eleonora Gonzaga (II); 30 April 1651; Wiener Neustadt four children	Also Holy Roman Emperor (1637–1657) as Ferdinand III, and King of Hungary and Bohemia.
Sigismund Francis	27 November 1630; Innsbruck; Second son of Leopold V and Claudia de' Medici 25 June 1665; Innsbruck aged 34	30 December 1662 25 June 1665	Archduchy of Further Austria	Hedwig of the Palatinate-Sulzbach; 13 June 1665; Sulzbach no children	Brother of the predecessor. After his death, his territories reverted to the elder line.
Leopold VI	9 June 1640; Vienna; Fourth son of Ferdinand IV and Maria Anna of Spain 5 May 1705; Vienna aged 64	2 April 1657 25 June 1665	Archduchy of Lower and Inner Austria	Margaret Theresa of Spain; 12 December 1666; Vienna four children Claudia Felicitas of Austria; 15 October 1673; Graz two children Eleanor Magdalene of Palatinate-Neuburg; 14 December 1676; Passau eleven children	Also Holy Roman Emperor as Leopold VI, and King of Bohemia and Hungary. In 1665, he unified Austria once more.
Leopold VI	9 June 1640; Vienna; Fourth son of Ferdinand IV and Maria Anna of Spain 5 May 1705; Vienna aged 64	25 June 1665 5 May 1705	Archduchy of Austria	Margaret Theresa of Spain; 12 December 1666; Vienna four children Claudia Felicitas of Austria; 15 October 1673; Graz two children Eleanor Magdalene of Palatinate-Neuburg; 14 December 1676; Passau eleven children	Also Holy Roman Emperor as Leopold VI, and King of Bohemia and Hungary. In 1665, he unified Austria once more.
Joseph I	26 July 1678; Vienna; Eldest son of Leopold I and Eleonor Magdalene of Neuburg 17 April 1711; Vienna aged 32	5 May 1705 17 April 1711	Archduchy of Austria	Wilhelmina Amalia of Brunswick; 10 June 1646; Vienna three children	Also Holy Roman Emperor, and King of Bohemia and Hungary.
Charles III	1 October 1685; Vienna; Second son of Leopold I and Eleonor Magdalene of Neuburg 20 October 1740; Vienna aged 55	17 April 1711 20 October 1740	Archduchy of Austria	Elisabeth Christine of Brunswick-Wolfenbüttel; 1 August 1708; Santa Maria del Mar, Barcelona five children	Also Holy Roman Emperor as Charles VI, and King of Bohemia and Hungary. In 1700, he claimed the Kingdom of Spain in the War of Spanish Succession (1700–1713).
Maria Theresa with Francis I Stephen (1740–1765); Joseph II (1765–1780)	13 May 1717; Hofburg Imperial Palace; Eldest daughter of Charles VI and Elisabeth Christine of Brunswick-Wolfenbüttel 29 November 1780; Hofburg Imperial Palace aged 63	20 October 1740 29 November 1780	Archduchy of Austria	12 February 1736; Vienna sixteen children	Also Queen of Bohemia and Hungary.
Francis I Stephen with Maria Theresa (1740–1765)	8 December 1708; Nancy; Fourth son of Leopold, Duke of Lorraine and Élisabeth Charlotte d'Orléans 18 August 1765; Innsbruck aged 56	20 October 1740 18 August 1765	Archduchy of Austria	12 February 1736; Vienna sixteen children	Also Holy Roman Emperor (1740–1765). Exchanged his original Duchy of Lorraine for the Grand Duchy of Tuscany (1737).
The Austrian agnatic branch ended in 1780 with the death of Maria Theresa of Austria and was replaced by a combination of the Austrian cognatic branch of the Habsburgs and the Vaudemont branch of the House of Lorraine in the person of her son Joseph II. The new successor house styled itself as Habsburg-Lorraine (Habsburg-Lothringen). All Habsburgs living today are in the agnatic line of Maria Theresa and Francis Stephen.
Joseph II	13 March 1741; Vienna; Eldest son of Francis I Stephen and Maria Theresa 20 February 1790; Vienna aged 48	29 November 1780 20 February 1790	Archduchy of Austria (Habsburg-Lorraine)	Isabella of Parma; 6 October 1760; Vienna two children Maria Josepha of Bavaria; 23 January 1765; Schönbrunn no children	Co-ruling with his mother since the death of his father. Also Holy Roman Emperor (1765–1790).
Leopold VII	5 May 1747; Vienna; Third son of Francis I and Maria Theresa 1 March 1792; Vienna aged 44	20 February 1790 1 March 1792	Archduchy of Austria (Habsburg-Lorraine)	Maria Luisa of Spain; 16 February 1764; Innsbruck sixteen children	Also elected Holy Roman Emperor (1790–1792) as Leopold II.
Francis II	12 February 1768; Florence; Eldest son of Leopold VII and Maria Luisa of Spain 2 March 1835; Vienna aged 67	1 March 1792 11 August 1804	Archduchy of Austria (Habsburg-Lorraine)	Four wives Details: Elisabeth of Württemberg 6 January 1788 Vienna one child Maria Theresa of Naples and Sicily 15 September 1790 Vienna 12 children Maria Ludovika of Austria-Este 6 January 1808 Vienna no children Caroline Augusta of Bavaria 29 October 1816 Vienna no children	In 1804 Francis adopted the new title Emperor of Austria, but kept the title of Archduke of Austria. Continued to rule as Holy Roman Emperor until the dissolution of the Holy Roman Empire on 6 August 1806.

== Emperors of Austria (1804–1918) ==
=== House of Habsburg-Lorraine ===
Following the dissolution of the Holy Roman Empire, Francis created his own Austrian Empire.

Name	Birth Death	Reign	Ruling part	Consort(s) Child(ren)	Notes
Francis	12 February 1768; Florence; Eldest son of Leopold VII, Archduke of Austria and Maria Luisa of Spain 2 March 1835; Vienna aged 67	11 August 1804 2 March 1835	Austrian Empire	Four wives Details: Elisabeth of Württemberg 6 January 1788 Vienna one child Maria Theresa of Naples and Sicily 15 September 1790 Vienna 12 children Maria Ludovika of Austria-Este 6 January 1808 Vienna no children Caroline Augusta of Bavaria 29 October 1816 Vienna no children	Ruled as Holy Roman Emperor Francis II until 6 August 1806.
Ferdinand the Benevolent	19 April 1793; Vienna; Son of Francis I and Maria Theresa of Naples and Sicily 29 June 1875; Prague aged 82	2 March 1835 2 December 1848	Austrian Empire	Maria Anna of Savoy; 12 February 1831; Turin (by procuration) no children	Abdicated due to the Revolutions of 1848.
Francis Joseph	18 August 1830; Florence; Son of Archduke Franz Karl of Austria and Princess Sophie of Bavaria 21 November 1916; Vienna aged 86	2 December 1848 21 November 1916	Austrian Empire Cisleithania	Elisabeth of Bavaria; 24 April 1854; Vienna four children	Nephew of Ferdinand I, and grandson of Francis I. The Empire became a dual monarchy following the Austro-Hungarian Compromise of 1867, forming Austria-Hungary.
Charles	17 August 1887; Persenbeug-Gottsdorf; Son of Archduke Otto Franz of Austria and Princess Maria Josepha of Saxony 1 April 1922; Funchal aged 34	21 November 1916 12 November 1918	Cisleithania	Zita of Bourbon-Parma; 21 October 1911; Schwarzau am Steinfeld eight children	Grand-nephew of Francis Joseph I, and great-great-grandson of Francis I.

Following the defeat in World War I, Austria-Hungary was dissolved in 1918.

== See also ==
- Austrian nobility
- History of Austria
- Pragmatic Sanction of 1713
- List of Austrian consorts
- List of heirs to the Austrian throne
- List of presidents of Austria
- List of chancellors of Austria
- List of Marshals of Austria
- Symmetria iuridico Austriaca
