= List of Austrian consorts =

Royal consorts of Austria

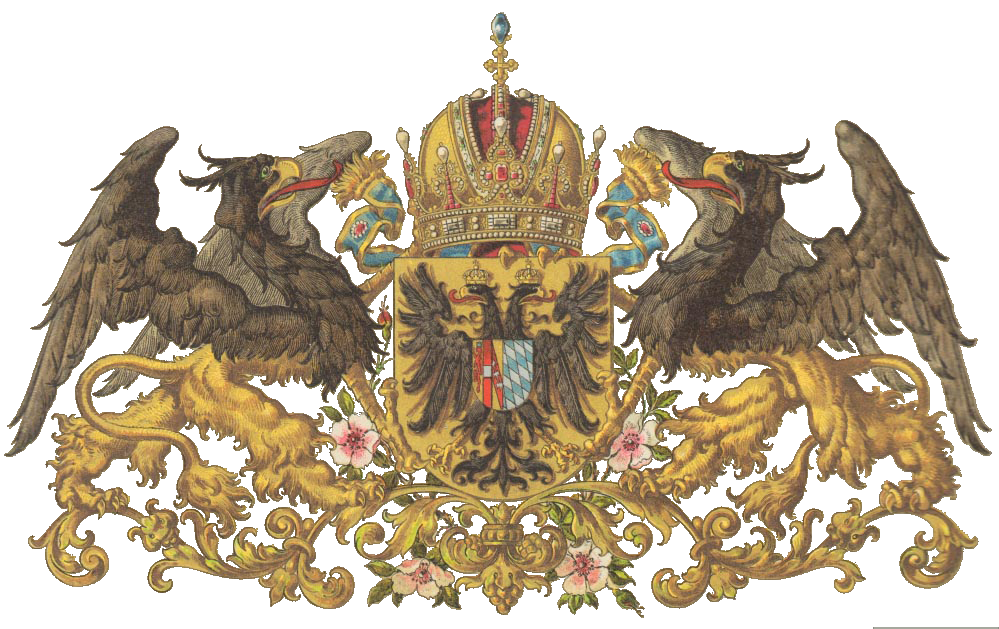
Arms of Empress Elisabeth of Bavaria

This is a list of the Austrian empresses, archduchesses, duchesses and margravines, wives of the rulers of Austria. The monarchy in Austria was abolished at the end of the First World War in 1918.

The different titles lasted just a little under a millennium, 976 to 1918.

== Margravine of Austria ==
=== House of Babenberg ===
Picture	Name	Father	Birth	Marriage	Became Margravine	Ceased to be Margravine	Death	Spouse
	Richardis of Sualafeldgau	Count Ernst IV of Sualafeldgau	945/950	?	976 husband's accession	10 July 994 husband's death	994?	Leopold I
	Glismod of West-Saxony	Count Immed IV in West-Saxony (Immedinger)	975/980	?	23 June 1018 husband's accession	1040		Adalbert
	Frozza Orseolo	Otto Orseolo, Doge of Venice (Orseolo)	1015	after 1040		26 May 1055 husband's death	17 February 1071	Adalbert
	Adelaide of Eilenburg	Dedi I, Margrave of the Saxon Ostmark (Wettin)	1040	1060		26 January 1071		Ernest
	Swanhilde of Ungarnmark	Sighard VII of Ungarnmark	?	1072		10 June 1075 husband's death	1120	Ernest
	Ida of Cham	Rapoto IV, Count of Cham	1055/1060	1065?	10 June 1075 husband's accession	12 October 1095 husband's death	September 1101	Leopold II
	Maria of Perg	Walchun of Perg (Perg)	1080	?	12 October 1095 husband's accession	1105		Leopold III
	Agnes of Germany	Henry IV, Holy Roman Emperor (Salian)	1072	1106		15 November 1136 husband's death	24 September 1143	Leopold III
	Hedwig of Hungary	Álmos of Hungary, Duke of Croatia (Árpád)	1107	1132	15 November 1136 husband's accession	9 November 1137 husband's death	1138	Adalbert II
	Maria of Bohemia	Soběslav I, Duke of Bohemia (Přemyslids)	1124/25	28 September 1138		18 October 1141 husband's death	1160	Leopold IV
	Gertrude of Süpplingenburg	Lothair III, Holy Roman Emperor (Süpplingenburg)	18 April 1115	1 May 1142		18 April 1143		Henry II
	Theodora Komnene	Sebastokrator Andronikos Komnenos (Komnenoi)	-	1148		17 September 1156; Privilegium Minus	2 January 1184	Henry II

== Duchess of Austria ==
=== House of Babenberg ===
Picture	Name	Father	Birth	Marriage	Became Duchess	Ceased to be Duchess	Death	Spouse
	Theodora Komnene	Sebastokrator Andronikos Komnenos (Komnenoi)	-	1148	17 September 1156; Privilegium Minus	13 January 1177 husband's death	2 January 1184	Henry II
	Helena of Hungary	Géza II of Hungary (Árpád)	1158	1172/4	13 January 1177 husband's accession	31 December 1194 husband's death	25 May 1199	Leopold V
	Theodora Angelina	Sebastokratōr John Doukas or a daughter of one of Andronikos Angelos daughters (Angeloi)	1180/5	1203		28 July 1230 husband's death	22/23 June 1246	Leopold VI
	Agnes of Merania	Otto I, Duke of Merania (Andechs-Merania)	1215	1229	28 July 1230 husband's accession	1240/3? divorce	7 January 1263	Frederick II

=== Interregnum ===
Picture	Name	Father	Birth	Marriage	Became Duchess	Ceased to be Duchess	Death	Spouse
	Kunigunda of Slavonia	Rostislav Mikhailovich (Rurikids)	1245	25 October 1261		November 1276 husband relinquished rights to Austria	9 September 1285	Ottokar II of Bohemia

=== House of Habsburg ===
Picture	Name	Father	Birth	Marriage	Became Duchess	Ceased to be Duchess	Death	Spouse
	Gertrude of Hohenberg	Burchard V, Count of Hohenburg (Burchardinger)	1225	1245	November 1276 husband's accession	16 February 1281		Rudolf I
	Elisabeth of Gorizia-Tyrol	Meinhard, Duke of Carinthia (Gorizia)	c. 1262	20 December 1274	December 1282 husband's accession 25 May 1300 consort jointly with daughter-in-law 1 March 1305 alone 16 October 1306 consort jointly with daughter-in-law 3/4 July 1307 alone	1 May 1308 husband's death	28 October 1312	Albert I
	Blanche of France	Philip III of France (Direct Capetians)	c. 1282	25 May 1300 consort jointly with mother-in-law		1 March 1305		Rudolph III
	Elisabeth Richeza of Poland	Przemysl II of Poland (Piast)	1 September 1286	16 October 1306 consort jointly with mother-in-law		3/4 July 1307 husband's death	18 October 1335	Rudolph III
	Isabella of Aragon	James II of Aragon (Barcelona)	1305	11 May 1315 consort jointly with sister-in-law 28 February 1326 alone		13 January 1330 husband's death	12 July 1330	Frederick I
	Catherine of Savoy	Amadeus V, Count of Savoy (Savoy)	1304	c. 1315 consort jointly with sister-in-law		28 February 1326 husband's death	30 September 1336	Leopold I
	Joanna of Pfirt	Ulrich III, Count of Pfirt (Scarponnois-Montbelliard)	1300	15 February 1324	13 January 1330 consort jointly with sister-in-law 25 March 1330 alone 16 February 1335 consort jointly with sister-in-law 3 September 1338 alone	15 November 1351		Albert II
	Elisabeth of Bavaria	Stephen I, Duke of Bavaria (Wittelsbach)	1306	15 May 1325	13 January 1330 consort jointly with sister-in-law	25 March 1330		Otto
	Anne of Bohemia	John of Bohemia (Luxembourg)	27 March 1323	25 March 1330 consort jointly with sister-in-law		3 September 1338		Otto
	Catherine of Bohemia	Charles IV, Holy Roman Emperor (Luxembourg)	19 August 1342	c. 1315?	16 August 1358 husband's accession	27 July 1365 husband's death	26 April 1395	Rudolph IV
	Elisabeth of Bohemia	Charles IV, Holy Roman Emperor (Luxembourg)	19 April 1358	after 19 March 1366 consort jointly with sister-in-law		4 September 1373		Albert III
	Beatrice of Nuremberg	Frederick V, Burgrave of Nuremberg (Hohenzollern)	1362	1375 consort jointly with sister-in-law		9 September 1379; Treaty of Neuberg	10 June 1414	Albert III
	Viridis Visconti	Bernabò Visconti, Lord of Milan (Visconti)	1352	23 February 1365	27 July 1365 alone after 19 March 1366 consort jointly with sister-in-law 4 September 1373 alone c. 1375 consort jointly with sister-in-law	9 September 1379; Treaty of Neuberg	1 March 1414	Leopold III

==== Albertinian Line ====
Albert III received the Archduchy of Austria, later called Lower Austria.

Picture	Name	Father	Birth	Marriage	Became Duchess	Ceased to be Duchess	Death	Spouse
	Beatrice of Nuremberg	Frederick V, Burgrave of Nuremberg (Hohenzollern)	1362	1375	9 September 1379; Treaty of Neuberg	29 August 1395 husband's death	10 June 1414	Albert III
	Joanna Sophia of Bavaria	Albert I, Duke of Bavaria (Wittelsbach)	1373	24 April 1390	29 August 1395 husband's accession	14 September 1404 husband's death	15 November 1410	Albert IV
	Elizabeth of Luxembourg	Sigismund, Holy Roman Emperor (Luxemburg)	7 October 1409	19 April 1422		27 October 1439 husband's death	25 December 1442	Albert V
Ladislaus the Posthumous, the last Albertian duke, died suddenly in Prague on 23 November 1457 while preparing for his marriage to Magdalena of Valois, daughter of Charles VII of France. He and Magdalena, therefore, never married. The territories of the Albertians were inherited by the Leopoldinians.

==== Leopoldinian line ====
===== Main line =====
Leopold III received the Duchies of Styria, Carinthia and Carniola, the County of Tyrol and Further Austria.

Picture	Name	Father	Birth	Marriage	Became Duchess	Ceased to be Duchess	Death	Spouse
	Viridis Visconti	Bernabò Visconti, Lord of Milan (Visconti)	1352	23 February 1365	9 September 1379; Treaty of Neuberg	9 July 1386 husband's death	1 March 1414	Leopold III
	Joan II of Naples	Charles III of Naples (Anjou-Durazzo)	23 June 1373	13 November 1401 consort jointly with second sister-in-law 1402 consort jointly with third sister-in-law		15 July 1406 husband's death	2 February 1435	William
	Catherine of Burgundy	Philip II, Duke of Burgundy (Valois-Burgundy)	April 1378	15 August 1393 alone 13 November 1401 consort jointly with eldest sister-in-law 1402 consort jointly with third sister-in-law 15 July 1406 alone after the division of Leopoldinian Austria		3 June 1411 husband's death	24 January 1425	Leopold IV
	Margaret of Pomerania	Bogislaw V, Duke of Pomerania (Pomerania-Wolgast)	1366	14 January 1392	1402 consort jointly with eldest and second sister-in-law	15 July 1406 division of Leopoldinian Austria	c. 1407/1410	Ernest

In 1406, the Leopoldinian lines split their territories:

===== Ernestine line =====
The Ernestine line received the Duchies of Styria, Carinthia and Carniola, also called Inner Austria:

Picture	Name	Father	Birth	Marriage	Became Duchess	Ceased to be Duchess	Death	Spouse
	Margaret of Pomerania	Bogislaw V, Duke of Pomerania (Pomerania-Wolgast)	1366	14 January 1392	15 July 1406 division of Leopoldinian Austria	c. 1407/1410		Ernest
	Cymburgis of Masovia	Siemowit IV, Duke of Masovia (Piast)	1394/1397	25 January 1412 archduchess as of 1414		10 June 1424 husband's death	28 September 1429	Ernest
	Eleanor of Portugal	Edward of Portugal (Aviz)	18 September 1434	16 March 1452 archduchess as of 1453		3 September 1467		Frederick V
	Mechthild of the Palatinate	Louis III, Elector Palatine (Wittelsbach)	7 March 1419	1452 archduchess as of 1458		2 December 1463 husband's death	22 August 1482	Albert VI

===== Elder Tyrolean line =====
The Elder Tyrolean Line received Tyrol and soon also Further Austria. These territories were also called Upper Austria:

Picture	Name	Father	Birth	Marriage	Became Duchess	Ceased to be Duchess	Death	Spouse
	Elisabeth of the Palatinate	Rupert of Germany (Wittelsbach)	27 October 1381	24 December 1446/7		31 December 1408		Frederick IV
	Anna of Brunswick	Frederick, Duke of Brunswick-Lüneburg (Brunswick-Lüneburg)	1390	11 June 1411		1432		Frederick IV
	Eleanor of Scotland	James I of Scotland (Stewart)	1433	12 February 1449 archduchess as of 1477		20 November 1480		Sigismund
	Catherine of Saxony	Albert III, Duke of Saxony (Wettin)	24 July 1468	24 February 1484 also archduchess		May 1490 husband's abdication	10 February 1524	Sigismund
	Anne of Brittany	Francis II, Duke of Brittany (Dreux-Montfort)	25 January 1477	19 December 1490 also archduchess		early 1492 annulled by the Pope	9 January 1514	Maximilian I
In 1493 the separate Austrian archduchies were united into one.

=== Claimant Duchesses ===
Matthias Corvinus, King of Hungary, claimed the Austrian territories and occupied Austria proper and Styria. Claiming the title "Duke of Austria", he resided in Vienna from 1485 to his death in 1490.

Picture	Name	Father	Birth	Marriage	Became Duchess	Ceased to be Duchess	Death	Spouse
	Beatrice of Naples	Ferdinand I of Naples (Trastámara)	16 November 1457	15 December 1476	1 June 1485 husband's conquest of most of Austria	6 April 1490 husband's death	23 September 1508	Matthias I

== Archduchess of Austria ==
=== House of Habsburg ===
Picture	Name	Father	Birth	Marriage	Became Archduchess	Ceased to be Archduchess	Death	Spouse
	Catherine of Bohemia	Charles IV, Holy Roman Emperor (Luxembourg)	19 August 1342	1350?	1358–59; Declaration of the Privilegium Maius by husband	27 July 1365 husband's death	26 April 1395	Rudolph IV
	Elisabeth of Bohemia	Charles IV, Holy Roman Emperor (Luxembourg)	19 April 1358	after 19 March 1366 consort jointly with sister-in-law		4 September 1373		Albert III
	Beatrice of Nuremberg	Frederick V, Burgrave of Nuremberg (Hohenzollern)	1362	1375 consort jointly with sister-in-law		29 August 1395 husband's death	10 June 1414	Albert III
	Viridis Visconti	Bernabò Visconti, Lord of Milan (Visconti)	1352	23 February 1365	27 July 1365 alone after 19 March 1366 consort jointly with sister-in-law 4 September 1373 alone c. 1375 consort jointly with sister-in-law	9 September 1379; Treaty of Neuberg	1 March 1414	Leopold III
	Johanna Sophia of Bavaria	Albert I, Duke of Bavaria (Wittelsbach)	1373	24 April 1390	29 August 1395 husband's accession	14 September 1404 husband's death	15 November 1410	Albert IV
	Elizabeth of Luxembourg	Sigismund, Holy Roman Emperor (Luxemburg)	7 October 1409	1422		27 October 1439 husband's death	25 December 1442	Albert V
	Cymburgis of Masovia	Siemowit IV, Duke of Masovia (Piast)	1394/1397	25 January 1412	1414 self-proclamation of husband as Archduke	10 June 1424 husband's death	28 September 1429	Ernest
	Leonor of Portugal	Edward of Portugal (Aviz)	18 September 1434	16 March 1452	1453 husband's recognition of the Privilegium Maius; 1458 consort jointly with sister-in-law 2 December 1463 alone	3 September 1467		Frederick V
	Mechthild of the Palatinate	Louis III, Elector Palatine (Wittelsbach)	7 March 1419	1452	1458 husband's granted title consort jointly with sister-in-law	2 December 1463 husband's death	22 August 1482	Albert VI
	Eleanor of Scotland	James I of Scotland (Stewart)	1433	12 February 1449	1477 husband's granted title	20 November 1480		Sigismund (UPPER AUSTRIA)
	Katharina of Saxony	Albert III, Duke of Saxony (Wettin)	24 July 1468	24 February 1484		May 1490 husband's abdication	10 February 1524	Sigismund (UPPER AUSTRIA)
	Anne of Brittany	Francis II, Duke of Brittany (Dreux-Montfort)	25 January 1477	19 December 1490		early 1492 annulled by the Pope	9 January 1514	Maximilian I (UPPER AUSTRIA)
The Austrian territories were again reunited in 1493.
	Bianca Maria of Milan	Galeazzo Maria, Duke of Milan (Sforza)	5 April 1472	16 March 1494		31 December 1510		Maximilian I
	Isabella of Portugal	Manuel I of Portugal (Aviz)	24 October 1503	10 March 1526		1 May 1539		Charles V
	Anna of Bohemia and Hungary	Vladislaus II of Bohemia and Hungary (Jagiello)	23 July 1503	25 May 1521		27 January 1547		Ferdinand I
In 1564 the Austrian territories were again divided among Emperor Ferdinand's three sons.

==== Lower Austria ====
Lower Austria (Austria proper) passed to Ferdinand's 1st son Maximilian:

Picture	Name	Father	Birth	Marriage	Became Archduchess	Ceased to be Archduchess	Death	Spouse
	Maria of Spain	Charles I, Archduke of Austria (Habsburg)	21 June 1528	13 September 1548	25 July 1564 husband's ascension	12 October 1576 husband's death	26 February 1603	Maximilian II
	Anna of Austria	Ferdinand II, Archduke of Austria (Habsburg)	4 October 1585	4 December 1611		14 December 1618		Matthias
Rudolf and Matthias died without issue and the territories passed to the descendants of Emperor Ferdinand's 3rd son Charles.

==== Upper Austria ====
Upper Austria (Tyrol, Further Austria) passed to Emperor Ferdinand's 2nd son Ferdinand:

Picture	Name	Father	Birth	Marriage	Became Archduchess	Ceased to be Archduchess	Death	Spouse
	Anna Juliana of Mantua	William I, Duke of Mantua (Gonzaga)	16 November 1566	14 May 1582		24 January 1595 husband's death	3 August 1621	Ferdinand II
Ferdinand died without an agnatic heir and his territories passed to the descendants of his brother Maximilian.
	Anna of Austria	Ferdinand II, Archduke of Austria (Habsburg)	4 October 1585	4 December 1611		14 December 1618		Matthias
Matthias died without issue and the territories passed to the descendants of Emperor Ferdinand's 3rd son Charles.

==== Inner Austria ====
Inner Austria ("Inner-Österreich") (Styria, Carinthia and Carniola) passed to Emperor Ferdinand's 3rd son Charles:

Picture	Name	Father	Birth	Marriage	Became Archduchess	Ceased to be Archduchess	Death	Spouse
	Maria Anna of Bavaria	Albert V, Duke of Bavaria (Wittelsbach)	21 March 1551	26 August 1571		10 July 1590 husband's death	29 April 1608	Charles II
	Maria Anna of Bavaria	William V, Duke of Bavaria (Wittelsbach)	8 December 1574	23 April 1600		8 March 1616		Ferdinand III
The Austrian territories were conclusively reunited in 1619.

==== Reunited and redivided, again ====
The Austrian territories were reunited again by inheritance in 1619 under Ferdinand III, Archduke of Inner Austria, but in 1623 five years into the Thirty Years' War he had so much to do with, Ferdinand divided them yet again, when he made his younger brother Leopold, who had been governor over Upper Austria, Archduke of those territories.

==== Lower Austria ====
Lower Austria and Inner Austria remained with the elder line (Ferdinand II, Holy Roman Emperor):

Picture	Name	Father	Birth	Marriage	Became Archduchess	Ceased to be Archduchess	Death	Spouse
	Eleonore of Mantua	Vincenzo I, Duke of Mantua (Gonzaga)	23 September (23 February?) 1598	4 February 1622		15 February 1637 husband's death	27 June 1655	Ferdinand III
	Maria Anna of Spain	Philip III of Spain (Habsburg)	18 August 1606	20 February 1631	15 February 1637 husband's ascension	13 May 1646		Ferdinand IV
	Maria Leopoldine of Austria	Leopold V, Archduke of Austria (Habsburg)	6 April 1632	2 July 1648		7 August 1649		Ferdinand IV
	Eleanor of Mantua	Charles II, Duke of Nevers and Rethel (Gonzaga)	18 November 1630	30 April 1651		2 April 1657 husband's death	6 December 1686	Ferdinand IV
The Austrian territories were conclusively reunited in 1665.

==== Upper Austria ====
Upper Austria passed to the Younger Tyrolean Line:

Picture	Name	Father	Birth	Marriage	Became Archduchess	Ceased to be Archduchess	Death	Spouse
	Claudia de' Medici	Ferdinando I de' Medici, Grand Duke of Tuscany (Medici)	4 June 1604	19 April 1626		13 September 1632 husband's death	25 December 1648	Leopold V
	Anna de' Medici	Cosimo II de' Medici, Grand Duke of Tuscany (Medici)	21 July 1616	10 June 1646		30 December 1662 husband's death	11 September 1676	Ferdinand Charles
	Hedwig Auguste of the Palatinate-Sulzbach	Christian Augustus, Count Palatine of Sulzbach (Wittelsbach)	25 April 1650	13 June 1665		25 June 1665 husband's death	23 November 1681	Sigismund Francis
After Sigismund Francis, the last Archduke, died without issue and his territories reverted to the elder line.

==== United again ====
The Austrian territories were conclusively reunited in 1665 under:

Picture	Name	Father	Birth	Marriage	Became Archduchess	Ceased to be Archduchess	Death	Spouse
	Margaret Theresa of Spain	Philip IV of Spain (Habsburg)	12 July 1651	12 December 1666		12 March 1673		Leopold VI
	Claudia Felicitas of Austria	Archduke Ferdinand Charles of Austria (Habsburg)	30 May 1653	15 October 1673		8 April 1676		Leopold VI
	Eleonore-Magdalena of the Palatinate-Neuburg	Philip William, Elector Palatine (Wittelsbach)	6 January 1655	14 December 1676		5 May 1705 husband's death	19 January 1720	Leopold VI
	Wilhelmina Amalia of Brunswick	John Frederick, Duke of Brunswick-Lüneburg (Welf)	21 April 1673	24 February 1699	5 May 1705 husband's ascension	17 April 1711 husband's death	10 April 1742	Joseph I
	Elisabeth Christine of Brunswick-Wolfenbüttel	Louis Rudolph, Duke of Brunswick-Wolfenbüttel (Welf)	28 August (28 September?) 1691	1 August 1708	17 April 1711 husband's ascension	20 October 1740 husband's death	21 December 1750	Charles III

=== House of Habsburg-Lorraine ===
Picture	Name	Father	Birth	Marriage	Became Archduchess	Ceased to be Archduchess	Death	Spouse
	Maria Josepha of Bavaria	Charles VII, Holy Roman Emperor (Wittelsbach)	30 March 1739	23 January 1765	18 August 1765 husband's ascension	28 May 1767		Joseph II
	Maria Louisa of Spain	Charles III of Spain (Bourbon)	24 November 1745	5 August 1765	20 February 1790 husband's ascension	1 March 1792 husband's death	15 May 1792	Leopold VII
	Maria Teresa of Naples and Sicily	Ferdinand I of the Two Sicilies (Bourbon-Two Sicilies)	6 June 1772	15 August 1790	1 March 1792 husband's ascension	6 August 1806 husband's abdication	13 April 1807	Francis I

== Empress of Austria ==
=== House of Habsburg-Lorraine ===
Picture	Name	Father	Birth	Marriage	Became Empress	Ceased to be Empress	Death	Spouse
	Maria Theresa of Naples and Sicily	Ferdinand I of the Two Sicilies (Bourbon-Two Sicilies)	6 June 1772	15 August 1790	11 August 1804 husband's ascension	13 April 1807		Francis I
	Maria Ludovika of Austria-Este	Archduke Ferdinand of Austria-Este (Habsburg-Este)	14 December 1787	6 January 1808		7 April 1816		Francis I
	Caroline Augusta of Bavaria	Maximilian I Joseph of Bavaria (Wittelsbach)	8 February 1792	29 October 1816		2 March 1835 husband's death	9 February 1873	Francis I
	Maria Anna of Sardinia	Victor Emmanuel I of Sardinia (Savoy)	19 September 1803	12 February 1831	2 March 1835 husband's ascension	2 December 1848 husband's abdication	4 May 1884	Ferdinand I
	Elisabeth in Bavaria	Maximilian Joseph, Duke in Bavaria (Wittelsbach)	24 December 1837	24 April 1854		10 September 1898		Franz Joseph I
	Zita of Bourbon-Parma	Robert I, Duke of Parma (Bourbon-Parma)	9 May 1892	13 June 1911	21 November 1916 husband's ascension	11 November 1918 husband's deposition	14 March 1989	Charles I

== See also ==
- List of Holy Roman Empresses (813/814-1804)
  - List of German queens
  - List of Italian queens
  - List of Burgundian consorts
- List of Hungarian consorts
- List of Bohemian consorts
