= Ernest of Austria =

Ernest of Austria may refer to:

- Ernest, Margrave of Austria, ruled from 1055 to 1077
- Ernest, Duke of Austria, ruled from 1402 to 1424
- Archduke Ernest of Austria (1553–1595)
