= Leopold II of Austria =

Leopold II of Austria may refer to:

- Leopold II, Margrave of Austria (1050-1095), Margrave of Austria from 1075 to 1095
- Leopold II, Duke of Austria (1328–1344), nominal co-ruler of Austria
- Leopold II, Holy Roman Emperor (1747-1792), Holy Roman Emperor and Archduke of Austria from 1790 to 1792
