= Empress Theresa =

Empress Theresa can refer to:

- Maria Theresa (1717–1780), Holy Roman Empress consort and ruler of the Habsburg monarchy
- Margaret Theresa of Spain (1651–1673), Holy Roman Empress consort
- Maria Theresa of Naples and Sicily (1772–1807), Holy Roman Empress consort and Empress consort of Austria
