= Battle of Mailberg =

Coordinates: 48°40′N 16°11′E

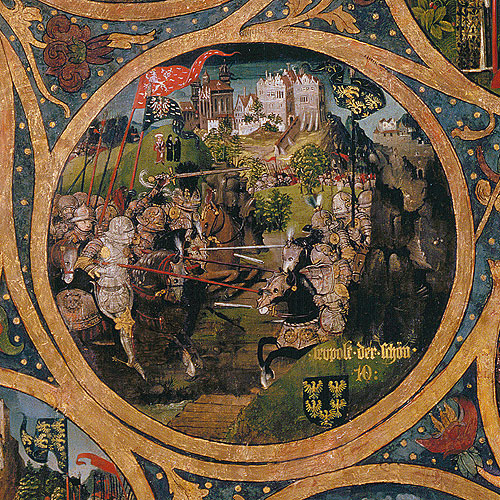
- Leopold the Fair at the Battle of Mailberg, Babenberger Stammbaum, Klosterneuburg Monastery, 1489–1492
Date	12 May 1082
Location	Mailberg, Austria
Result	Decisive Bohemian victory

Belligerents
Duchy of Bohemia	Margraviate of Austria: County of Bogen

Commanders and leaders
Vratislaus II of Bohemia	Leopold II, Margrave of Austria; Adalbert I, Count of Bogen

Strength
6,000 Bohemians; 2,000 mercenaries (from Moravia and Bavaria)	3,000 Austrians; 500 cavalry

Casualties and losses
Minor	Most killed or captured
- Location within Austria

The Battle of Mailberg took place on 12 May 1082. The opponents were Vratislaus II of Bohemia (Czech: Vratislav II.) and Leopold II, Margrave of Austria (German: Luitpold II).

== Battle ==
Vratislaus invaded Austria with an army of 6,000 soldiers from Bohemia and another 2,000 mercenaries from Moravia and Bavaria. Leopold and his army of about 3,500 soldiers met the invaders in a valley near Mailberg. Leopold was probably supported by additional forces from the conquered areas who remained loyal to the Babenbergs.

According to reports by the historian Cosmas of Prague, Leopold arranged his troops in a wedge configuration, while Wratislaw arranged his troops in three parallel columns: the Moravian troops on the left, the Bohemian troops in the center, and the heavily armed Bavarians on the right.

== Aftermath ==
Vratislav and his allies achieved a complete victory. The losses on the Bohemian side were minor, according to Cosmas. The Austrians were taken prisoner and held for ransom. Only a few of Leopold's men were able to escape. In 1899, at a construction site near Mailberg, the remains of numerous soldiers and horses were discovered—most likely from the Battle of Mailberg.

As a result of the battle, the northern areas of Lower Austria were devastated from pillage and famine. The Bohemian border was moved closer to Mailberg, recapturing land that had been lost to the Austrians under Bretislaus I in 1041. After the death of Leopold II in 1095, his daughter Gerbirg (Gerberga) married Bořivoj II, the second son Vratislav in 1100.
