= Agnes of Austria (1322–1392) =

German princess (1322-1392)

Agnes of Austria (Polish: Agnieszka; 1322 – 2 February 1392) was a German princess, member of the House of Habsburg and, by marriage, Duchess of Świdnica.

She was the second daughter of Leopold I, Duke of Austria, by his wife Katharina, daughter of Amadeus V, Count of Savoy.

== Life ==
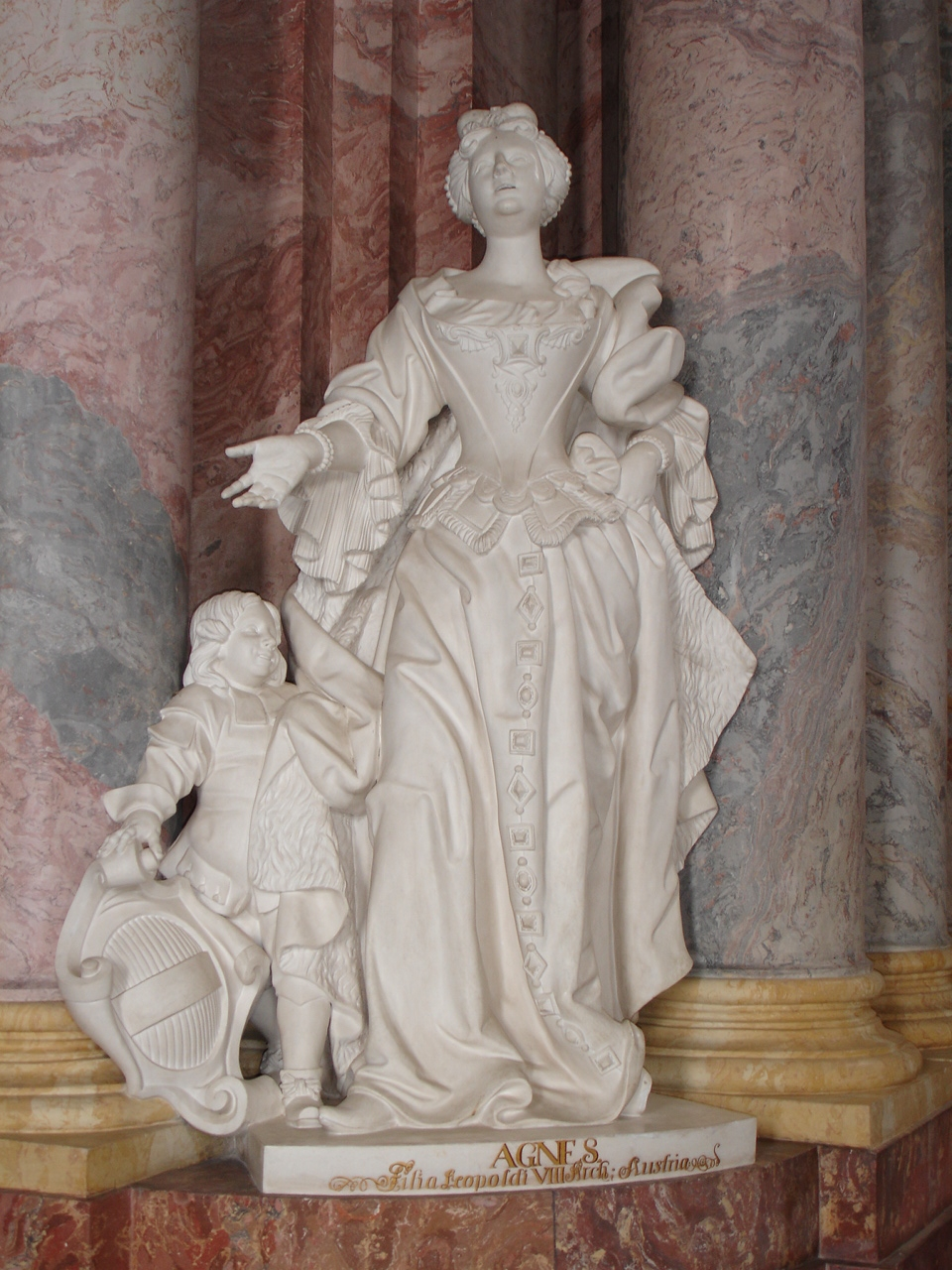
Agnes of Habsburg's sculpture in the Fürstenkapelle of Grüssau Abbey.

After the early death of her father in 1326, Agnes and her older sister Katharina (later by marriage Lady of Coucy) were placed under the guardianship of their paternal uncles, Frederick the Fair and Albert II.

On 1 June 1338 Agnes married with Bolko II the Small, Duke of Świdnica, who wanted with this union to enhance his international position against the House of Luxembourg, direct competitors of the Habsburgs.

The marriage apparently was childless, although some sources stated that they had two children: a daughter, Elisabeth (d. 1407) and a son, Bolko, who, according to old Silesian legend, died at only nine years old, accidentally killed by the court jester Jakob Thau, when he threw a stone to him during a game.

After the death of her husband in 1368, and according to his will, Agnes received Świdnica, Jawor and Lwówek as her dower.

Agnes died on 2 February 1392 in Świdnica and was buried in the Franciscan Princely Chapel (Fürstenkapelle) of the Grüssau Abbey. According to the treaty of 1353 between Bolko II and the Emperor Charles IV, on her death the duchies were incorporated into the lands of Bohemia by Wenceslaus, King of the Romans.

Under the rule of the Abbot Benedict II Seidel (1735–1747) was built in the Fürstenkapelle a sculpture of white marble from Agnes, which is still there.

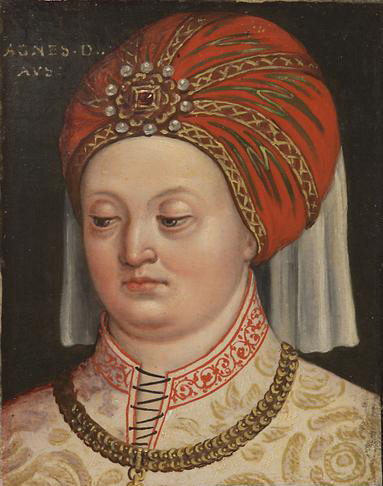
Agnes

== Sources ==
- Rossignol, Sébastien (2025). Medieval Silesia: An Inclusive History. Routledge.

Agnes of Austria (1322–1392) House of Habsburg Born: 1322 Died: 2 February 1392
Preceded by Bolko II the Small	Duke of Świdnica; 1368–1392	Succeeded by Annexed to the Kingdom of Bohemia
Preceded by Bolko II the Small	Duke of Jawor; 1368–1392	Succeeded by Annexed to the Kingdom of Bohemia
Preceded by Bolko II the Small	Duke of Lwówek; 1368–1392	Succeeded by Annexed to the Kingdom of Bohemia
