= Inner Austria =

Historical region of Europe

Coordinates: 46°41′40.8″N 14°32′45.23″E

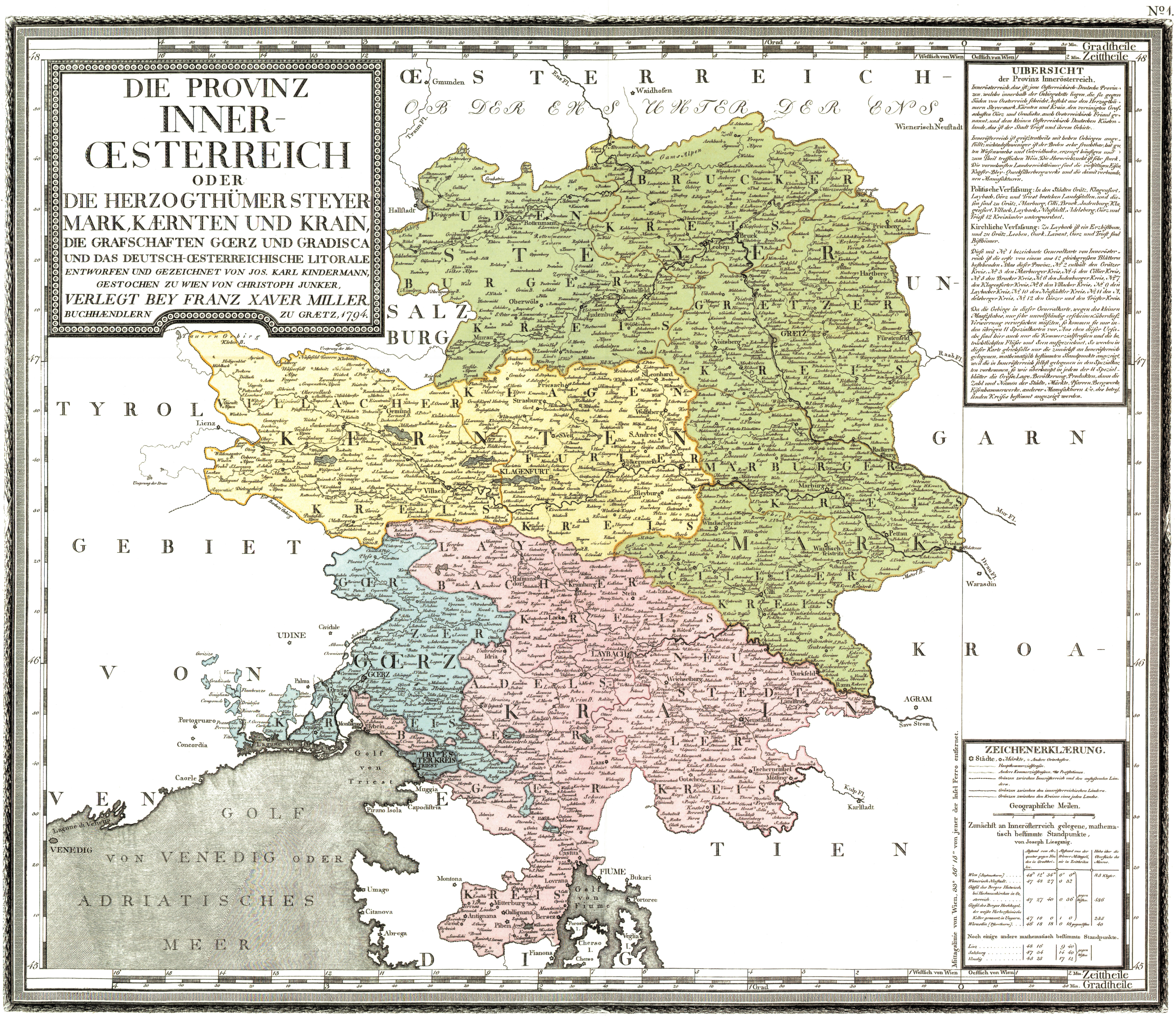
Late 18th century map of the Habsburg Inner Austrian province: Duchy of Styria Duchy of Carinthia Duchy of Carniola with the Lordship of Duino and the March of Istria Princely County of Gorizia and Gradisca Imperial City of Trieste

Inner Austria (German: Innerösterreich; Slovene: Notranja Avstrija; Italian: Austria Interiore) was a term used from the late 14th to the early 17th century for the Habsburg hereditary lands south of the Semmering Pass, referring to the Imperial duchies of Styria, Carinthia and Carniola and the lands of the Austrian Littoral. The residence of the Inner Austrian archdukes and stadtholders was at the Burg castle complex in Graz.

== Geography ==
The Inner Austrian territory stretched from the northern border with the Archduchy of Austria on the Alpine divide over Upper and Lower Styria down to Carniola, where the Lower and White Carniolan lands (the former Windic March) bordered on the Habsburg Kingdom of Croatia. In the west, the Carinthian lands stretched to the Archbishopric of Salzburg and the Habsburg County of Tyrol, while in the east, the Mur River formed the border with the Kingdom of Hungary.

In the south, the County of Görz, which had passed to the House of Habsburg in 1500, and Duino (Tybein) bordered on the Domini di Terraferma of Venice. The Imperial Free City of Trieste on the Adriatic Coast linked to assorted smaller possessions in the March of Istria around Pazin and the free port of Rijeka (later corpus separatum of Fiume) in Liburnia.

== History ==
The Styrian lands had already been ruled in personal union by the Babenberg dukes of Austria since 1192 and were finally seized with the Austrian lands by the Habsburg king Rudolph I of Germany upon his victory in the 1278 Battle on the Marchfeld. In 1335 Rudolph's grandson Duke Albert II of Austria also received the Carinthian duchy with the adjacent March of Carniola at the hands of Emperor Louis the Bavarian as Imperial fiefs.

Austria proper (below and above the Enns river), Inner Austria, and Upper Austria (Tyrol and Vorarlberg)

When in 1365 Albert's son Duke Rudolf IV of Austria suddenly died at the age of 26, Emperor Charles IV enfeoffed his younger brothers Albert III with the Pigtail and Leopold III the Just, who however began to quarrel about the Habsburg heritage. By the 1379 Treaty of Neuberg they finally split late Rudolf's territories: The elder Albertinian line would rule in the Archduchy of Austria proper (then sometimes referred to as "Lower Austria" (Niederösterreich), but comprising modern Lower Austria and most of Upper Austria), while the younger Leopoldian line ruled the Styrian, Carinthian and Carniolan duchies, then subsumed under the denotation of "Inner Austria". At that time their share also comprised Tyrol and the original Habsburg possessions in Swabia, called Further Austria; both collectively referred to as "Upper Austria" (Oberösterreich) in that context, also not to be confused with the modern state of that name.

When Leopold III was killed in the 1386 Battle of Sempach against the Old Swiss Confederacy, the Leopoldian heritage fell to his eldest son Duke William the Courteous, who upon the death of his uncle Albert III in 1395 also raised claims to the Archduchy of Austria against Albert's only son and heir Duke Albert IV. Both sides came to an agreement to maintain the Neuberg division but also to assert the common rule over the Habsburg lands. Therefore, from 1404 William acted as Austrian regent for his minor nephew Albert V. The Tyrolean and Further Austrian lands passed to William's younger brother Duke Leopold IV the Fat. When Duke William died without issue in 1406, the Leopoldian line was further split among his younger brothers: while Leopold IV assumed the regency in Austria, the Inner Austrian territories passed to Ernest the Iron, while the Tyrolean/Further Austrian passed to the youngest brother Frederick of the Empty Pockets.

In 1457 the Leopoldian line again could assume the rule over the Austrian archduchy, when Ernest's son Duke Frederick V of Inner Austria succeeded his Albertine cousin Ladislaus the Posthumous who had died without issue. 1490 saw the reunification of all Habsburg lines, when Archduke Sigismund of Further Austria and Tyrol resigned in favour of Frederick's son Maximilian I. In 1512, the Habsburg territories were incorporated into the Imperial Austrian Circle.

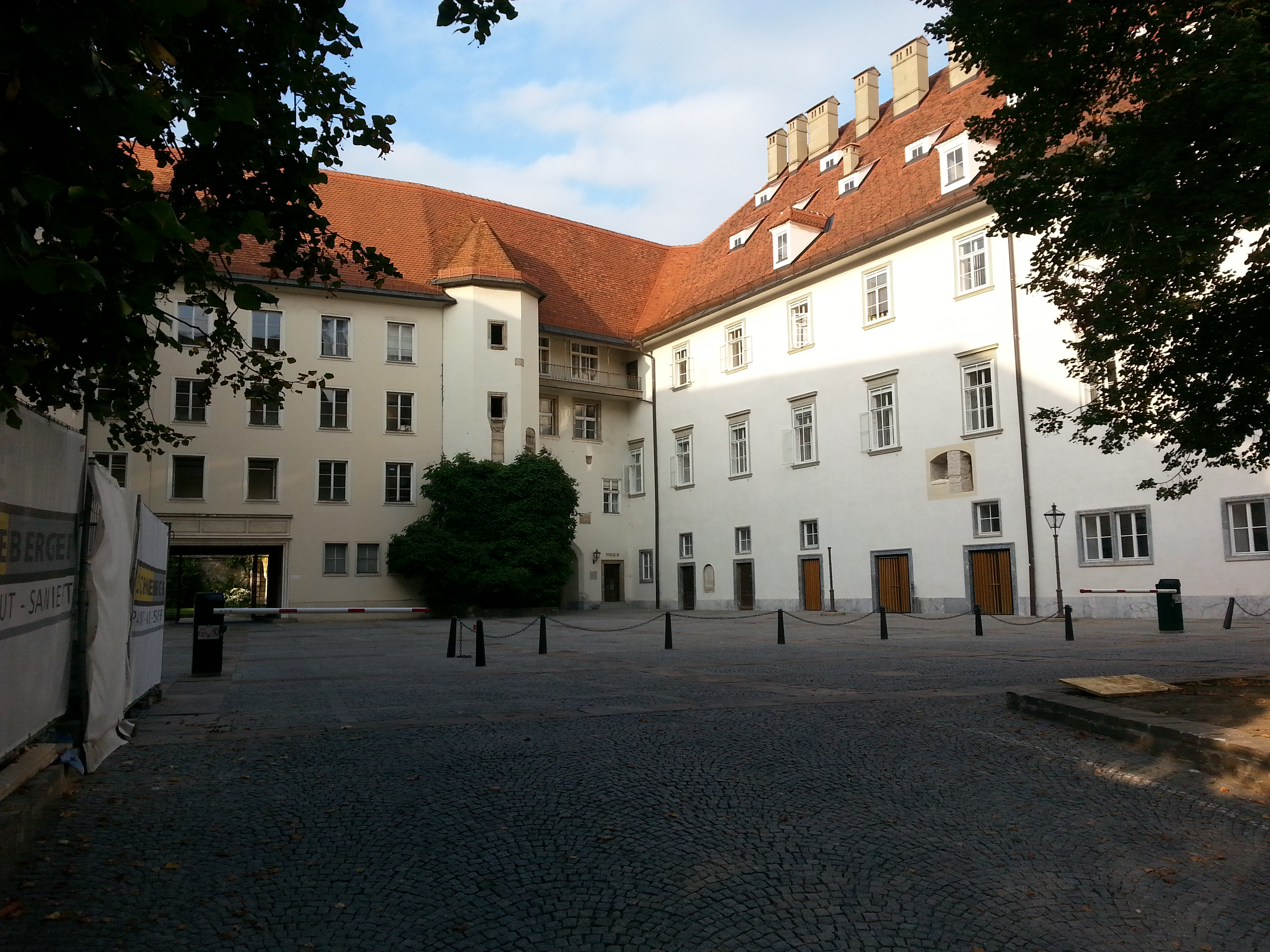
Graz Castle, courtyard

The dynasty however was split up again in 1564 among the children of deceased Emperor Ferdinand I of Habsburg. Under the Inner Austrian line founded by his younger son Archduke Charles II, the lands became a centre of the Counter-Reformation, carried out by the Jesuits with great determination. The cadet branch prevailed again, when Charles' son and successor as regent of Inner Austria, Archduke Ferdinand II, was crowned King of Bohemia in 1617, King of Hungary in 1618, and finally succeeded his cousin Matthias in the Archduchy of Austria (as Ferdinand III) and as Holy Roman Emperor in 1619. His intentions to translate the absolutist and anti-reformationist Inner Austrian policies to the Crown of Bohemia sparked the Thirty Years' War.

The Further Austrian/Tyrolean line of Ferdinand's younger brother Archduke Leopold V survived until the death of his son Sigismund Francis in 1665, whereafter all territories ultimately returned to common control with the other Austrian Habsburg lands. The political administration of Inner Austria was centralized at Graz in 1763. Inner Austrian stadtholders went on to rule until the days of Empress Maria Theresa in the 18th century.

== Administration from 1748 ==
Duchies of Styria, Carinthia, Carniola etc., 1657 map by Joan Blaeu

- Duchy of Styria
  - Lower Styria
    - Graz District:
    - Marburg District
    - Cilli District
  - Upper Styria
    - Bruck District
    - Judenburg District
- Duchy of Carinthia
  - Klagenfurt District (Lower Carinthia)
  - Villach District (Upper Carinthia)
- Duchy of Carniola
  - Laibach District (Upper Carniola)
  - Adelsberg District (Inner Carniola and Istria)
  - Neustadtl District (Lower Carniola)
- Princely County of Gorizia and Gradisca
  - Görz District
- Imperial Free City of Trieste
  - Triest District

== Rulers of Inner Austria ==
=== Leopoldian line ===
| Name | Portrait | Birth | Marriage(s) | Death |
|---|---|---|---|---|
| Leopold III the Just; 1379–1386 | | 1 November 1351; Vienna fourth son of Albert the Wise and Joanna of Pfirt | Viridis Visconti; 23 February 1365; Vienna six children | 9 July 1386; Sempach aged 34 |
| William the Courteous; 1386–1406 | | c. 1370; Vienna eldest son of Leopold the Just and Viridis Visconti | Joan II of Naples; 13 November 1401; Vienna no issue | 15 July 1406; Vienna aged 36 |
| Leopold IV the Fat; 1406–1411 | | c. 1371; Vienna second son of Leopold the Just and Viridis Visconti | Catherine of Burgundy; 15 August 1393; Vienna no issue | 3 June 1411; Vienna aged 40 |
| Ernest the Iron; 1406–1424 | | c. 1377; Bruck an der Mur third son of Leopold the Just and Viridis Visconti | (1) Margaret of Pomerania; 14 January 1392; Bruck an der Mur no issue (2) Cymburgis of Masovia; 25 January 1412; Kraków nine children | 10 June 1424; Bruck an der Mur aged 47 |
| Frederick V the Peaceful; 1457–1493 | | 21 September 1415; Innsbruck first son of Ernest the Iron and Cymburgis of Masovia | Eleanor of Portugal; 16 March 1452; Rome five children | 19 August 1493; Linz aged 77 |

Frederick became Archduke of Austria in 1457, Habsburg territories united in 1490.

=== Inner Austrian line ===
| Name | Portrait | Birth | Marriage(s) | Death |
|---|---|---|---|---|
| Charles II; 1564–1590 | | 3 June 1540; Vienna fourth son of Ferdinand I and Anne of Bohemia and Hungary | Maria Anna of Bavaria; 26 August 1571; Vienna fifteen children | 10 July 1590; Graz aged 50 |
| Ferdinand II; 1590–1637 under regency of Ernest of Austria (1590–1593); Maximilian III (1593–1595) | | 9 July 1578; Graz second son of Charles II and Maria Anna of Bavaria | (1) Maria Anna of Bavaria; 23 April 1600; Graz seven children (2) Eleonor Gonzaga; 2 February 1622; Innsbruck no issue | 15 February 1637; Vienna aged 58 |

Ferdinand became Holy Roman Emperor in 1619.

== See also ==
- History of Austria
- History of Slovenia
- Further Austria
