= Blanche of France, Duchess of Austria =

Duchess of Austria from 1300 to 1305

Blanche of France
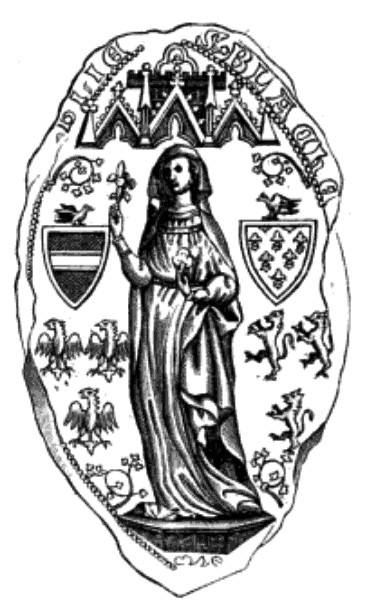
- Blanche's effigy on her seal

Duchess consort of Austria
- Tenure: 25 May 1300 – 1 March 1305
- Born: c. 1278
- Died: 1 March 1305 (aged c. 26–27); Vienna, Austria
- Burial: Minoritenkirche, Vienna
- Spouse: Rudolf III of Austria (m. 1300)
- House: Capet
- Father: Philip III of France
- Mother: Maria of Brabant

Blanche of France (German: Blanca; c. 1278 – 1 March 1305) was Duchess of Austria and Styria as the wife of the HabsburgRudolph III, eldest son of King Albert I of Germany. She served as regent in Styria during the absence of her husband.

== Life ==
Blanche was born in Paris, the second child of King Philip III of France and his second wife, Maria of Brabant. Her siblings were Louis, Count of Évreux and Margaret, Queen of England. Blanche also had two older half-brothers from her father's first marriage: Philip, the future King of France, and Charles, Count of Valois.

=== Betrothals ===
Blanche was betrothed four times before her eventual marriage. Her first betrothal was to John I of Namur, in September 1290. However, the wedding did not materialize.

Blanche's second betrothal was on 31 July 1291 to Edward, Prince of Wales. Edward was seven years old at this time, while Blanche was thirteen. As the alliance was being negotiated between the two courts, Edward's mother died. She had borne fourteen children, but Edward was her only surviving son. His father, king Edward I, therefore resolved to marry again and beget more sons. While he looked for a suitable match for himself, he formalized the betrothal of his son with Blanche.

Over the next two years, Blanche came of age and developed into a great beauty, whereas an aging Edward I had still not found a bride for himself. Upon hearing reports of her appearance, Edward I sent emissaries to her half-brother's court to negotiate a termination of the existing betrothal and the terms for marriage between Blanche and himself. King Philip IV of France agreed to give his half-sister in marriage to the king of England on the following terms:

1. that a truce would be concluded between the two countries; and
2. that Edward would cede the province of Gascony to France.

Edward agreed to these conditions and the betrothal took place by proxy in 1293. Blanche's third and latest fiancé, king Edward I, was nearly forty years older than her. After the proxy betrothal, king Edward sent his brother, Edmund Crouchback, Earl of Lancaster, to fetch Blanche. Upon his arrival at the French court, Lancaster discovered that Blanche was already betrothed to someone else. King Philip instead offered Edward his even younger half-sister Margaret, who was at the time only eleven years old. Edward refused Margaret's hand and instead declared war on France. Five years later, Edward and Philip negotiated a truce under which Edward would marry Margaret (then sixteen years old) and receive both the territory of Guienne and the sum of £15,000, which was owed to Margaret as her inheritance. Many years later, Blanche's second fiancé Edward II would marry her half-brother king Philip's only daughter, Isabella of France.

Blanche's fourth betrothal, in 1296, was to John, son of John II of Holland, but that all did not fructify into marriage.

=== Marriage ===
As King Albert I of Germany aimed at a dynastic relation with the French royal House of Capet, he had entered into negotiations with the Paris court about 1295. Blanche married Rudolph on 25 May 1300; however, she did not arrive in Vienna until Christmas. The Austrian court admired her rich endowment, but also noted a taste for luxury and pomp. The duchess accompanied her husband on a journey to the Styrian lands, where she proved supportive to the Habsburg pretensions. During the absence of Rudolph, he briefly left her to rule as regent in Styria.

Blanche bore Rudolf a stillborn daughter in 1304 and a short-lived son who survived her, and was probably poisoned in March 1306, a year after her death. She died on 1 March 1305, possibly of complications after a miscarriage.

Since 1784, Blanche is buried at the Minoritenkirche in Vienna. Upon her death, Rudolf secondly married the Piast princess Elizabeth Richeza of Poland.

== Sources ==
- Morrison, Elizabeth; Hedeman, Anne Dawson, eds. (2010). Imagining the Past in France: History in Manuscript Painting, 1250–1500. J. Paul Getty Museum.
