= Swanhilde of Ungarnmark =

Austrian royal consort (died 1120)

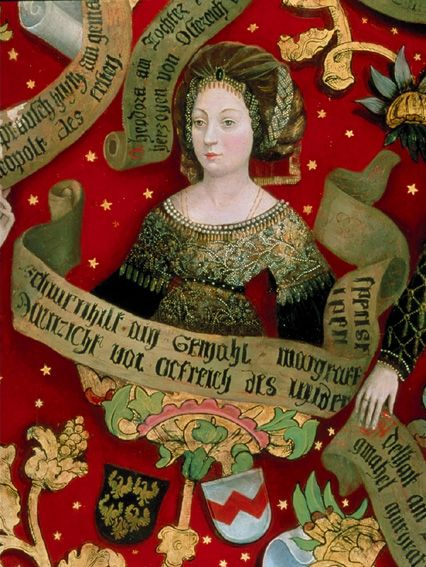
Swanhilde of Ungarnmark, Margravine of Austria

Swanhilde of Ungarnmark (Swanhilde von der Ungarnmark; died 1120) was an Austrian royal consort as Margravine of Austria.

== Family ==
She was a daughter of Sighard VII of Ungarnmark and his wife, Philihild.

In 1072, she married Ernest, Margrave of Austria; becoming his second wife. They had no children together.

Swanhilde died in 1120.
