= Symmetria iuridico Austriaca =

Symmetria iuridico Austriaca continens Viva Themidis & Austriiæ oscula. Seu Theses et hypotheses deductas ex utroque jure; Nec non celeberioribus factis ac symbolis augustissimorum imperatorum et inclyta domo Austriaca.
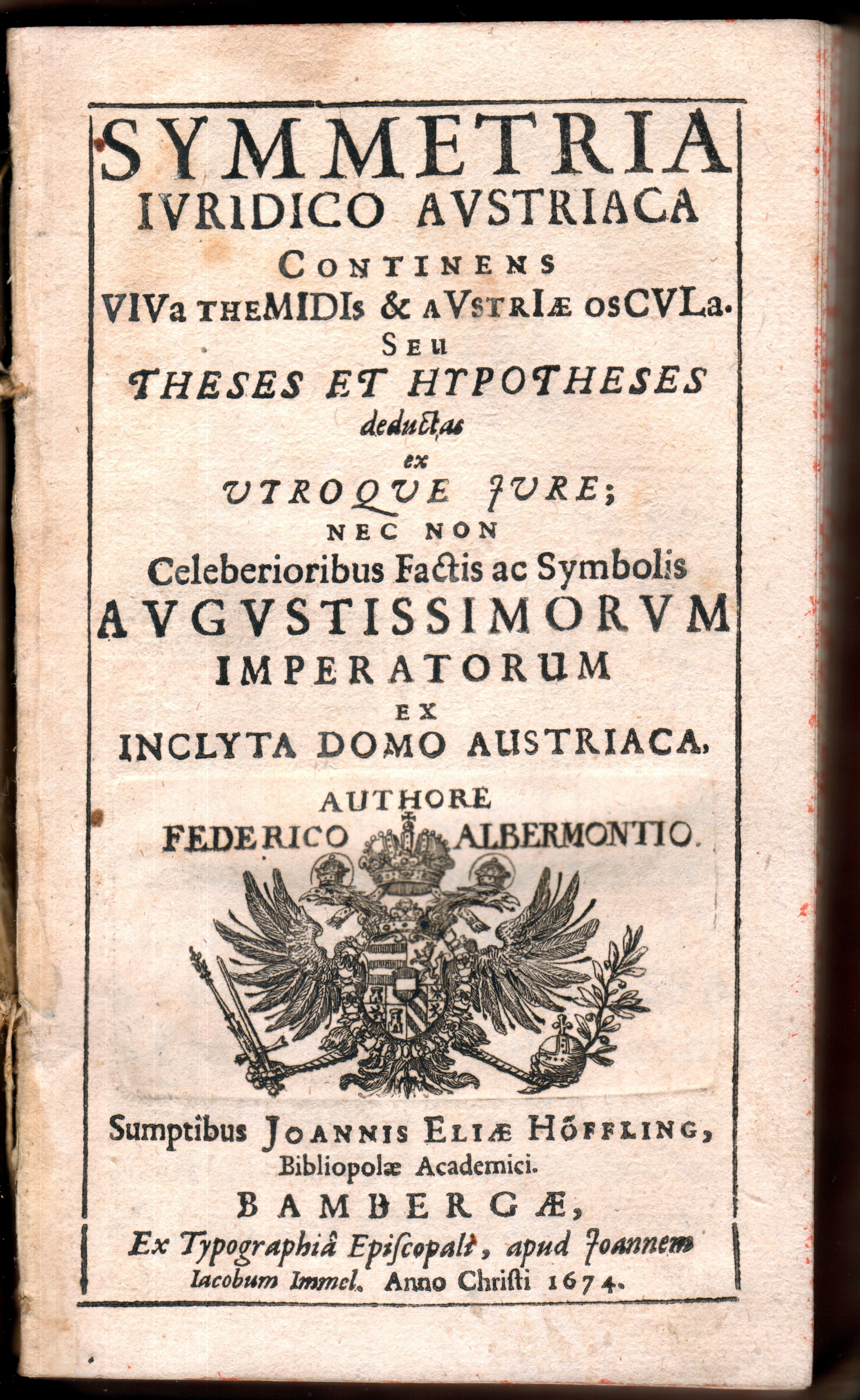
- Title page of book Symmetria iuridico Austriaca
- Author: Albermontius Federicus
- Original title: Symmetria iuridico Austriaca continens Viva Themidis & Austriiæ oscula. Seu Theses et hypotheses deductas ex utroque jure; Nec non celeberioribus factis ac symbolis augustissimorum imperatorum et inclyta domo Austriaca.
- Language: latin
- Subject: Rulers of Austria
- Genre: history, law, rulers, Austria
- Publisher: Joannis Eliae Höffling, Diocesan printing house in Bamberg
- Publication date: 1674
- Publication place: Austria
- Pages: 136

Symmetria iuridico Austriaca (full title: Symmetria iuridico Austriaca continens Viva Themidis & Austriiæ oscula. Seu Theses et hypotheses deductas ex utroque jure; Nec non celeberioribus factis ac symbolis augustissimorum imperatorum et inclyta domo Austriaca.) (Latin: Symmetria iuridico Austriaca) is book containing instructions for governing according to Roman and Ecclesiastical law, as well as according to Roman-German law. It contains basic biographical information for 17 Austrian rulers; it was written by Latin historian and writer Albermontius Federicus.

== Exempli gratia ==
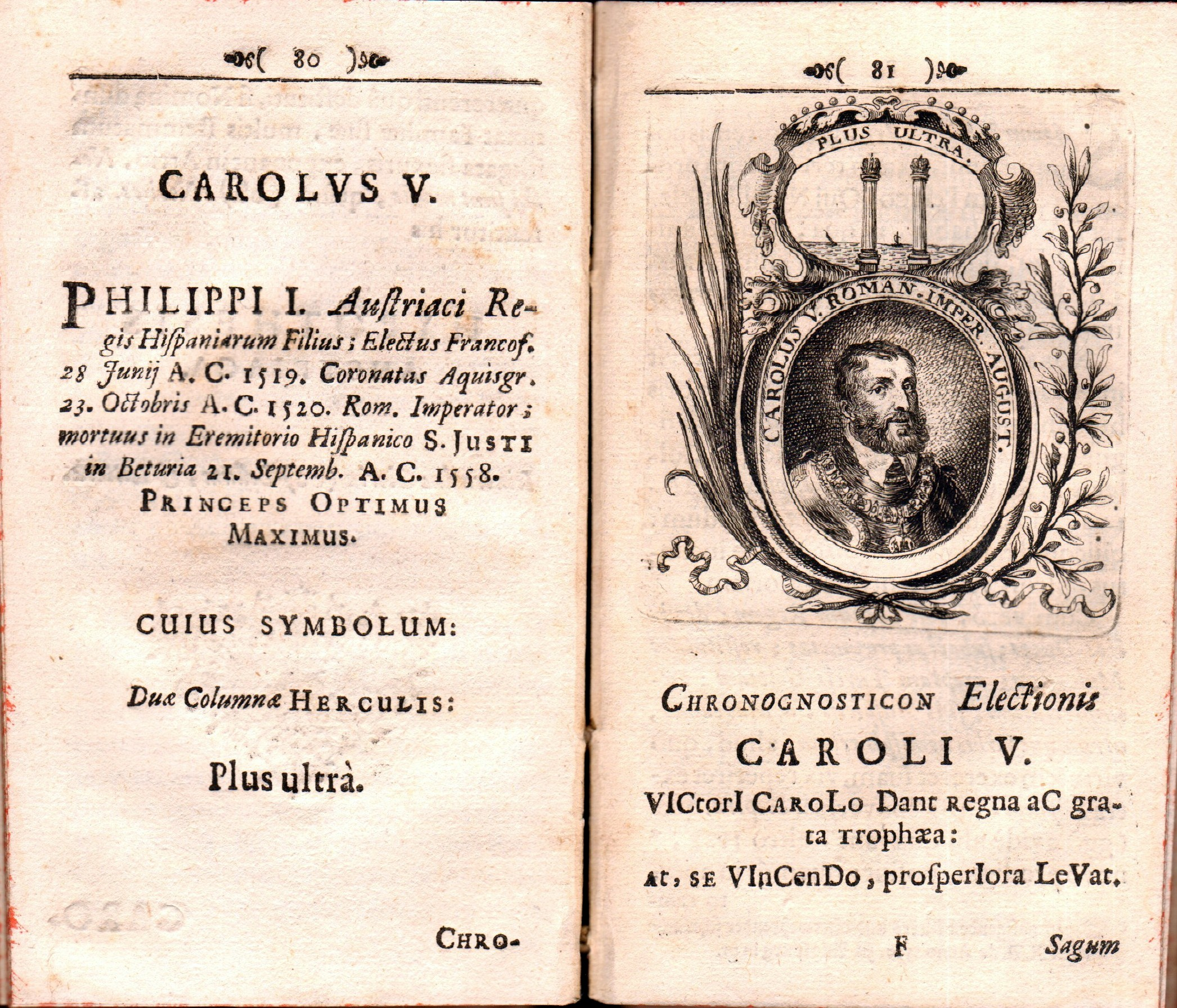
Charles V The etching of the most famous Austrian ruler until the publication of book in 1674

Latin text

Symmetria iuridico Austriaca : continens viva Themidis & AustrIae oscula : seu theses et hypotheses deductas ex vtroque jure; nec non celeberioribus factis ac symbolis augustissimorum imperatorum ex inclyta domo Austriaca

English translation

Austrian juridical symmetry: containing the living kisses of Themis and Austria: or theses and hypotheses derived from each law; nor with the more famous deeds and symbols of the most august emperors from the famous Austrian house

== Sources ==
- Albermontius, Federicus (1674). "XIII Theses". In Joannis Eliae Höffling (ed.). Symmetria iuridico Austriaca continens Viva Themidis & Austriiæ oscula. Seu Theses et hypotheses deductas ex utroque jure; Nec non celeberioribus factis ac symbolis augustissimorum imperatorum et inclyta domo Austriaca. Ex Typographia Episcopali, apud Joannem Iacobum Immel.
