= Ida of Formbach-Ratelnberg =

11th- and 12th-century Austrian noblewoman

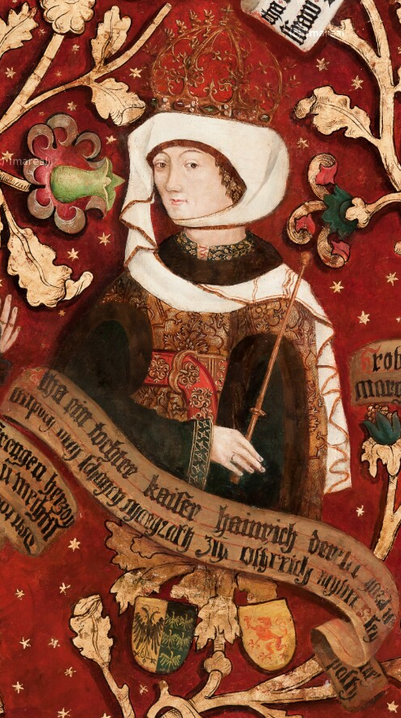
- Ida depicted on the family tree (Genealogy of the Babenberg Ladies)
- Born: Ida c. 1055
- Died: September 1101; Heraclea Cybistra, Cilicia
- Noble family: House of Babenberg
- Spouse: Leopold II of Austria
- Issue Detail: Leopold III, Margrave of Austria
- Father: Rapoto IV of Cham
- Mother: Mathilde

Ida of Austria (c. 1055 – September 1101) was a Margravine of Austria by marriage to Leopold II of Austria. She was a crusader, participating in the Crusade of 1101 with her own army.

== Life ==
Ida was the daughter of Rapoto IV of Cham and Mathilde. She is also known as Itha. She married Leopold II of Austria and had a son, Leopold III. She was known as one of the great beauties of her day.

In 1101, Ida, alongside Thiemo of Salzburg and the Bavarian duke Welf IV and the French duke William IX of Aquitaine, joined the Crusade of 1101, and raised and led her own army toward Jerusalem.

In September of that year, Ida and her army were among those ambushed at Heraclea Cybistra by the sultan Kilij Arslan I. Ekkehard of Aura reports that Ida was killed in the fighting, but rumors persisted that she survived, and was carried off to a harem, according to Albert von Aachen. Later legends claimed that she was the mother of the Muslim hero Zengi, as in Historia Welforum, but this is impossible on chronological grounds. However, Ekkehard of Aura's is probably the most likely version, as he is the only one who can rely on eyewitnesses who were survivors of the Battle of Heraclea Cybistra, whom Ekkehard met a few weeks later in Jaffa, while Albert von Aachen and the author of the Historia Welforum reported only after hearsay.

== In fiction ==
Ida's fate is depicted in Beloved Pilgrim (2011) by Christopher Hawthorne.

== Issue ==
- Leopold III (1073–1136), who succeeded his father as Austrian margrave
- Adelaide (d. after 1120), married Count Theoderic II of Formbach
- Elizabeth (d. 1107), married Margrave Ottokar II of Styria
- Gerberga (d. 1142), married Duke Bořivoj II of Bohemia
- Ida, married the Přemyslid prince Luitpold of Znojmo
- Euphemia, married Count Conrad I of Peilstein
- Sophia (d. 1154), married Henry of Eppenstein, Duke of Carinthia from 1090 to 1122, and, secondly, Count Sieghard X of Burghausen
- Judith

== See also ==
- Kilij Arslan II – who claimed blood cousinage with Henry the Lion.

== Sources ==
- Aurell, Martin (2021). "Joan of England and Al-'Adil's Harem: The Impossible Marriage between Christians and Muslims (Eleventh-Twelfth Centuries)". In Church, Stephen D. (ed.). Anglo-Norman Studies XLIII: Proceedings of the Battle Conference 2020. The Boydell Press. pp. 1–14. ISBN 9781783276059.
- Rainer, Johann (1981). Storia e vita culturale in Austria (in Italian). Bulzoni.
- Historia Welforum Weingartensis
- Runciman, Steven. A History of the Crusades, Vol. II
- Lechner Karl. Die Babenberger. Markgrafen und Herzoge von Österreich 976–1246, Böhlau Verlag Wien-Köln-Weimar 1992.
