= Catherine of Savoy =

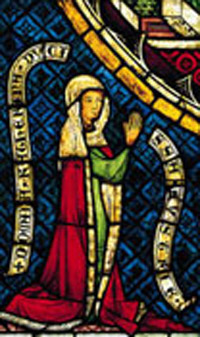
Catherine of Savoy

Catherine of Savoy (Brabant, between 1297 and 1304 – Rheinfelden, 30 September 1336) was a princess of the House of Savoy, and since 1315 the wife of Leopold I, Duke of Austria and Styria (1290–1326) from the House of Habsburg.

== Biography ==
Catherine was a daughter of Count Amadeus V of Savoy and his second wife, Maria of Brabant. As a result of the rapprochement between the Habsburgs and the House of Luxembourg, discussions began in 1310 regarding Catherine's marriage to Duke Leopold I of Austria, third son of Albert I of Germany, her mother being a niece of Henry VII of Luxembourg.

The couple finally married in Basel on 26 May 1315. They had:

- Catherine (1320-1349), married to Enguerrand VI de Coucy
- Agnes (1322-1392), married to Duke Bolko II of Schweidnitz-Jauer

Catherine was also politically active and intervened in the Habsburgs' struggle to regain the throne of the Holy Roman Empire, after the death of her father-in-law in 1308, and corresponded with Pope John XXII.

Widowed since 1326, she died ten years later. Her body was buried in the Königsfelden Monastery. Since 1809, Catherine's remains have rested in Saint Paul's Abbey, Lavanttal.

== Sources ==
- Cox, Eugene L. (1967). The Green Count of Savoy. Princeton, New Jersey: Princeton University Press. LCCN 67-11030.
- Miller, William (1921). Essays on the Latin Orient. Cambridge at the University Press.
- Rossignol, Sébastien (2025). Medieval Silesia: An Inclusive History. Routledge.
