= Treaty of Neuberg =

1379 treaty dividing Habsburg lands

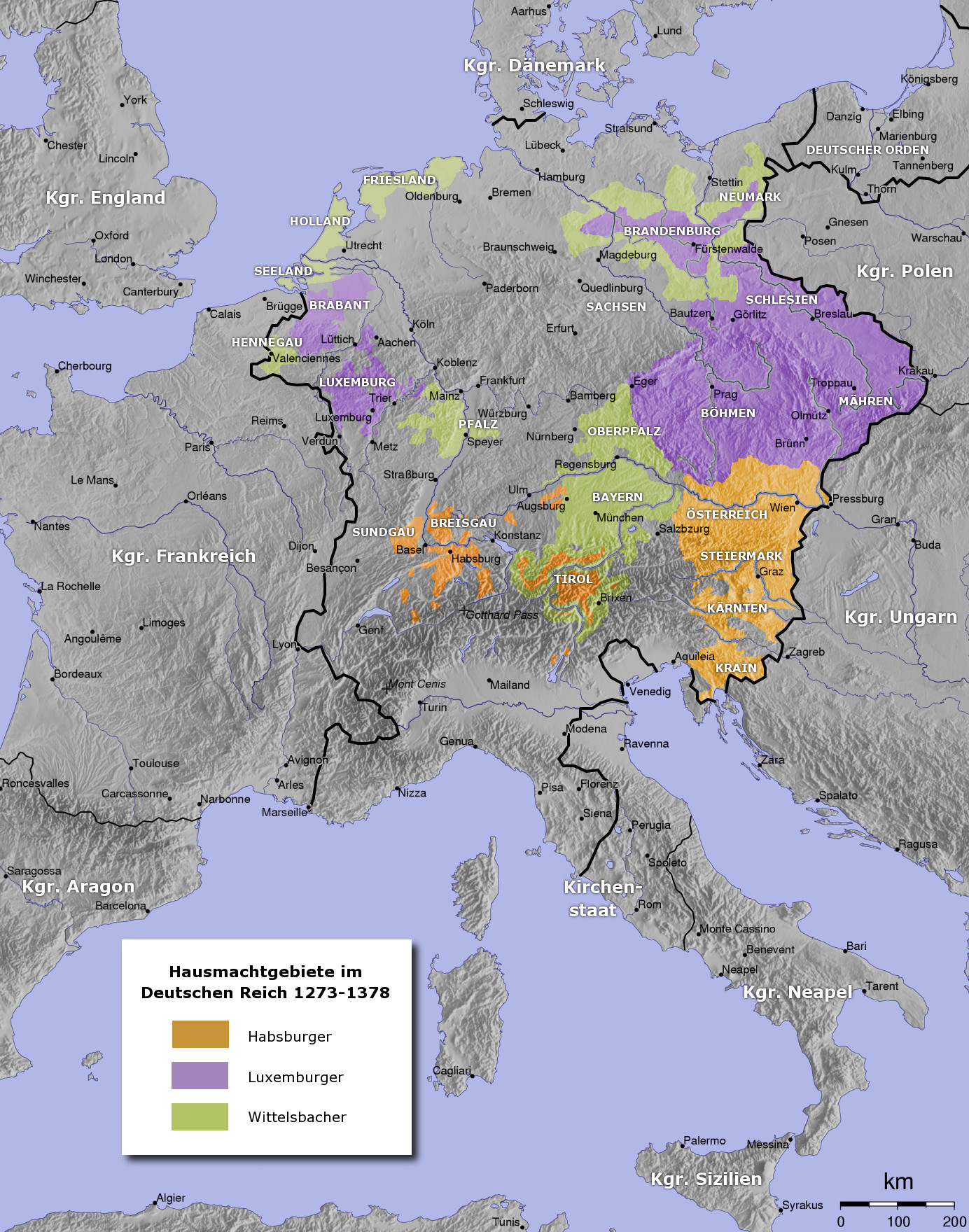
Dynastic territories in the Holy Roman Empire, 1273–1378: House of Habsburg House of Luxembourg House of Wittelsbach

The Treaty of Neuberg, concluded between the Austrian duke Albert III and his brother Leopold III at Neuberg Abbey on 25 September 1379, determined the division of the Habsburg hereditary lands into the Albertinian line and the Leopoldian line.

== Background ==
Albert and Leopold were the younger brothers of Duke Rudolf IV of Austria, who upon the death of his father Duke Albert II in 1358 had assumed the rule not only over the Austrian duchy, but also over the Duchy of Styria, ruled in personal union with Austria according to the 1186 Georgenberg Pact, and over the Duchy of Carinthia with the adjacent March of Carniola.

Rudolf, an energetic monarch struggling with the rivalling Wittelsbach and Luxembourg dynasties, immediately elevated himself to an Austrian archduke by the Privilegium Maius. In 1363 he acquired the County of Tyrol from the last Meinhardiner countess Margaret and the next year added "Duke of Carniola" to his titles. Upon his early death in 1365, his brothers inherited a significant cluster of Imperial States stretching from the Habsburg residence Vienna to the dynasty's original Further Austrian possessions in the west, the nucleus of the Habsburg monarchy.

== Terms ==
Rudolf had decreed the joint rule of his younger brothers by house law (Rudolfinische Hausordnung) in 1364. However, they fell out with each other soon after his death. On 9 September 1379 a partition treaty was signed in Neuberg Abbey in Styria:

- Albert and his descendants (Albertinian line, extinct in 1457) retained the Archduchy of Austria proper, i.e. later Upper and Lower Austria, including the Traungau and Salzkammergut;
- Leopold and his descendants (Leopoldian line) became the exclusive ruler of Styria (then including Pitten and the town of Wiener Neustadt), Carinthia, Carniola (enlarged by the Windic march and territory in the March of Istria since 1374), Tyrol and Further Austria, as well as Trieste and acquisitions in Friuli (the latter were annexed to Carniola).

Regardless of their territories, all Habsburg rulers would retain the Austrian archducal title.

== Aftermath ==
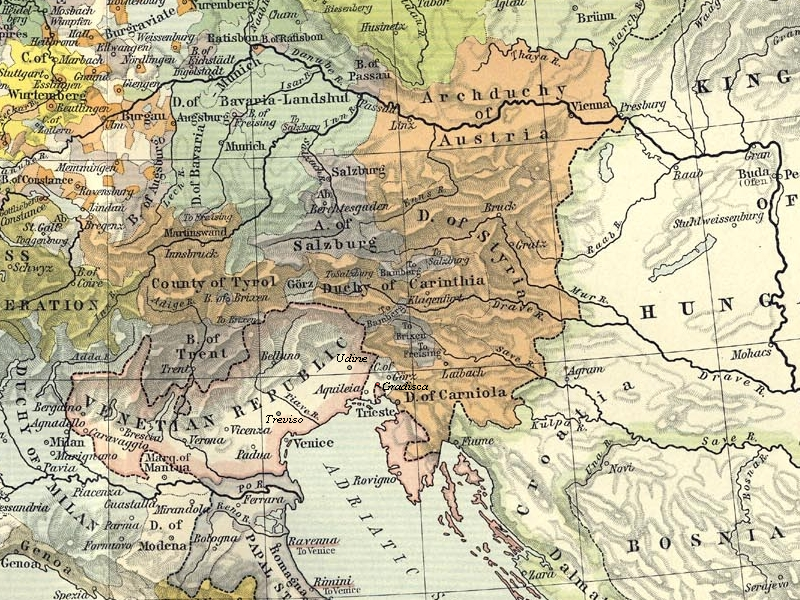
Habsburg lands (orange) in 1477

Under Leopold's sons, the Leopoldian possessions were further subdivided into Inner Austria (i.e. Styria, Carinthia, Carniola, and Littoral) and 'Upper Austria' (not to be confused with the present-day Austrian state of Upper Austria), comprising Tyrol and the Further Austrian lands, from 1406 ruled by Leopold's youngest son Duke Frederick IV.

The split between the Albertinian and Leopoldinian lines of the Habsburg family and the Austrian lands enfeebled the dynasty's position. The Albertinian archduke Albert V of Austria was elected King of the Romans in 1438. Nevertheless, he died one year later and the line finally became extinct by the death of his son Ladislaus the Posthumous in 1457. The territories were inherited by the Leopoldian archduke Frederick V of Inner Austria, Albert's successor as King of the Romans and from 1452 also Holy Roman Emperor. Finally, in 1490, all Habsburg territories were reunified, when Archduke Sigismund handed over the rulership of Tyrol and Further Austria ('Upper Austria') to Emperor Frederick's son King Maximilian I.

== See also ==
- History of Austria
