= Adelaide of Eilenburg =

German noblewoman

- Born: 1030
- Died: 26 January 1071
- Noble family: Wettin
- Spouse: Ernest, Margrave of Austria
- Issue: Leopold II, Margrave of Austria
- Father: Dedi I, Margrave of the Saxon Ostmark
- Mother: Oda of Lusatia

Adelaide of Eilenburg (c. 1030 – 26 January 1071) was a German noblewoman. She was a daughter of Margrave Dedi I of the Saxon Eastern March and his first wife, Oda of Lusatia.

In 1050, she married Margrave Ernest of Austria during his reign and became Margravine of Austria. He was a member of the House of Babenberg; she was his first wife. Adelaide and Ernest had four children:

- Leopold II (d. 1095)
- Adalbert I, Count of Pernegg (d. 1100)
- a daughter, who married Count Herman I of Poigen
- Justitia, married Count Otto II of Dießen-Wolfratshausen
