= Leopold II, Margrave of Austria =

Margrave of Austria from 1075 to 1095

Leopold II
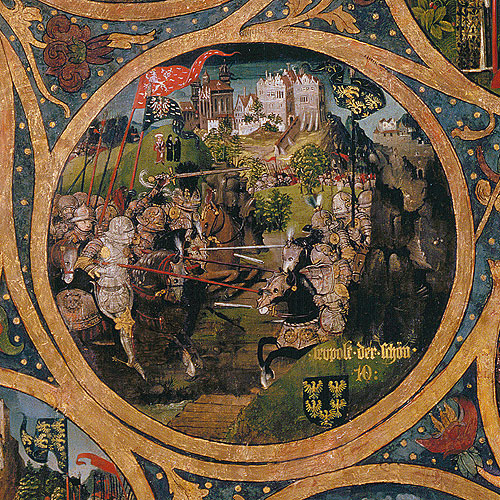
- Leopold the Fair at the Battle of Mailberg, Babenberger Stammbaum, Klosterneuburg Monastery, 1489–1492

Margrave of Austria
- Reign: 1075–1095
- Predecessor: Ernest
- Successor: Leopold III
- Born: 1050
- Died: 12 October 1095; Gars am Kamp(?), Austria
- Noble family: Babenberg
- Spouse: Ida of Formbach-Ratelnberg
- Issue Detail: Leopold III, Margrave of Austria
- Father: Ernest
- Mother: Adelaide of Eilenburg

Leopold II (1050 – 12 October 1095), known as Leopold the Fair (German: Luitpold der Schöne), a member of the House of Babenberg, was Margrave of Austria from 1075 until his death in 1095. A supporter of the Gregorian Reforms, he was one of the main opponents of the German king Henry IV during the Investiture Controversy.

== Biography ==
Leopold the Fair was born in 1050, the son of Margrave Ernest of Austria and his wife Adelaide of Eilenburg, the daughter of the Wettin margrave Dedi I of Lusatia. His Babenberg ancestors had ruled the Margraviate of Austria since the appointment of Leopold's great-grandfather Leopold I in 976.

Leopold II succeeded as margrave upon his father's death in June 1075, at the time when the Investiture Dispute broke out between King Henry IV and Pope Gregory VII. He first sided with the German monarch and stayed at his court even after Henry's Walk to Canossa in January 1077. However, he switched sides under the influence of his wife Ida and Bishop Altmann of Passau, a loyal supporter of Pope Gregory who was expelled from his diocese by Henry's forces in 1078. Altmann fled to Austria and Margrave Leopold had to face an invasion by royal troops the next year, which led to the final break with the king.

In summer 1081, while King Henry IV was on campaign in Italy, Leopold backed the election of anti-king Count Hermann of Salm and convened an Austrian diet at Tulln where he officially dissociated from Henry. Subsequently, he was declared deposed by the king, who gave the Imperial fief to his loyal supporter Duke Vratislav II of Bohemia. The Přemyslid duke invaded Austria and defeated Leopold in the 1082 Battle of Mailberg, from where the margrave narrowly escaped with his life. Ultimately, however, he managed to retain his position, while Vratislav was elevated to a King of Bohemia in 1085. Leopold lost some territory in Southern Moravia north of the Thaya river, ruled by Prince Luitpold of Znojmo, who was, nevertheless, his son-in-law.

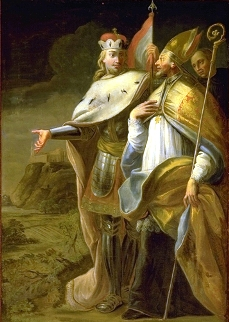
Leopold II and Abbot Sigibold of Melk, ceiling fresco in Melk Abbey, c. 1745

While Bishop Altmann of Passau stayed in Austria, the margraviate obtained a leading position in promoting the Gregorian Reforms, overruling the concept of proprietary churches and marriages of priests. Altmann introduced the Cluniac oberservance to Kremsmünster Abbey and in 1083 established the Augustinian monastery of Göttweig near Krems. In 1089 Margrave Leopold helped pay for the construction of Melk Abbey in the Wachau region by donating extended premises high above the shore of the Danube for the new monastery. The ruins of Gars am Kamp castle, the last margravial residence of Leopold, are 68 kilometres (42 mi) away.

== Marriage and children ==
In 1065 Leopold married Ida (1055–1101), a Bavarian countess of Formbach (Vornbach). Ida was the daughter of Count Rapoto IV and Matilda and a relative of Archbishop Thiemo of Salzburg. She is said to have died during the Crusade of 1101. Leopold and Ida had a son:

- Leopold III (1073–1136), who succeeded his father as Austrian margrave,

as well as seven daughters:

- Adelaide (d. after 1120), married Count Theoderic II of Formbach
- Elizabeth (d. 1107), married Margrave Ottokar II of Styria
- Gerberga (d. 1142), married Duke Bořivoj II of Bohemia
- Ida, married the Přemyslid prince Luitpold of Znojmo
- Euphemia, married Count Conrad I of Peilstein
- Sophia (d. 1154), married Henry of Eppenstein, Duke of Carinthia from 1090 to 1122, and secondly Count Sieghard X of Burghausen.
- Judith

Leopold II, Margrave of Austria House of Babenberg Born: 1050 Died: 1095
Preceded by Ernest	Margrave of Austria; 1075–1095	Succeeded by Leopold III
