= Ernest, Margrave of Austria =

Margrave of Austria from 1055 to 1075

Ernest
- Margrave of Austria
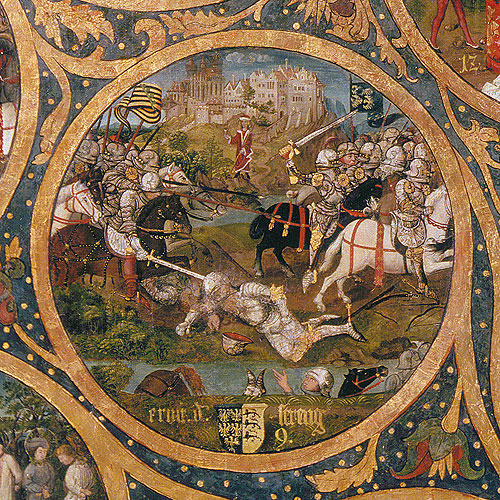
- Ernest the Brave at the Battle of Langensalza, Babenberger Stammbaum, Klosterneuburg Monastery, 1489–1492
- Margravate: 1055–1075
- Predecessor: Adalbert
- Successor: Leopold II
- Born: 1027
- Died: 10 June 1075 (aged 47–48)
- Noble family: Babenberg
- Spouse: Adelaide of Eilenburg; Swanhilde of Ungarnmark
- Issue Detail: Leopold II
- Father: Adalbert
- Mother: Frozza Orseolo

Ernest (German: Ernst, 1027 – 10 June 1075), known as Ernest the Brave (Ernst der Tapfere), was the Margrave of Austria from 1055 to his death in 1075. He was a member of the House of Babenberg.

== Biography ==
He was born to Margrave Adalbert of Austria and his wife Frozza Orseolo, daughter of Doge Otto Orseolo of Venice. He increased the territory of his margraviate by amalgamating the Bohemian and Hungarian frontier marches up to the Thaya, March and Leitha rivers in what is today Lower Austria. In his time, the colonisation of the remote Waldviertel region was begun by his ministeriales, the Kuenring knights.

Ernest received his epithet due to his fighting against King Béla I of Hungary and his son Géza I on behalf of their rival Solomon according to the chronicler Lambert of Hersfeld. In the commencing Investiture Controversy, he sided with King Henry IV of Germany and battled against the Saxons, dying at the Battle of Langensalza.

== Marriage and children ==
In 1050 Ernest married Adelaide of Eilenburg (1030 – 26 January 1071), daughter of the Wettin margrave Dedi I of Lusatia, who gave him four children:

- Leopold II, Margrave of Austria (1050–1095)
- Justitia (d. 1120/1122), married Count Otto II of Wolfratshausen
- Adalbert of Pernegg, Count of Bogen
- a daughter, who married Count Herman I of Poigen

In 1072 he secondly married Swanhild, daughter of Count Sighard VII in the Hungarian March.

== See also ==
- List of rulers of Austria

Ernest, Margrave of Austria House of Babenberg Born: 1027 Died: 1075
Preceded by Adalbert	Margrave of Austria; 1055–1075	Succeeded by Leopold II
