= Frozza Orseolo =

Margravine of Austria (1015–1071)

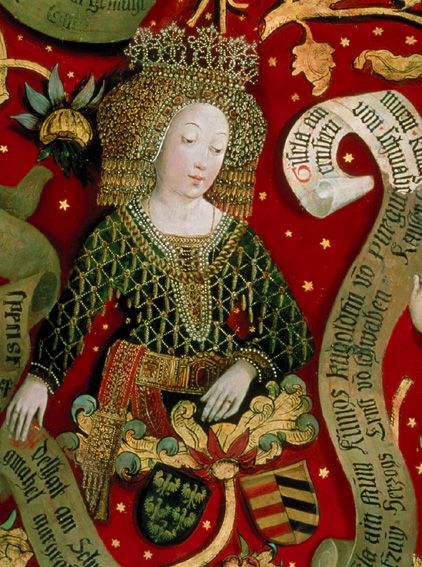
- Frozza's image on the Babenberg family tree
- Born: 1015; Venice, Republic of Venice
- Died: 17 February 1071 (aged 55–56)
- Spouse: Adalbert, Margrave of Austria
- Issue: Ernest, Margrave of Austria
- Father: Otto Orseolo
- Mother: Grimelda of Hungary

Frozza Orseolo (1015 – 17 February 1071) was a Margravine of Austria by marriage to Adalbert, Margrave of Austria. She was also a member of the Venetian House of Orseolo.

== Life ==
Frozza was born in Venice as a daughter of Doge Otto Orseolo and his wife, Princess Grimelda of Hungary.

Her father, grandfather, and great-grandfather were all Doges of Venice, and were members of the House of Orseolo, whose ancestors were the first historical Doges of Venice, the Ipatos.

Her brother was Peter the Venetian, King of Hungary and she was possibly a sister-in-law of Judith of Schweinfurt.

She married Adalbert, Margrave of Austria, of the House of Babenberg, and later took the name of Adelheid. They had 2 sons: Leopold & Ernest, Margrave of Austria.
