= Timeline of Austrian history =

This is a timeline of Austrian history, comprising important legal and territorial changes and political events in Austria and its predecessor states. To read about the background to these events, see history of Austria.

== 10th century ==
Year	Date	Event
955	10 August	Battle of Lechfeld (955): An East Frankish army under king Otto I, Holy Roman Emperor trapped a Hungarian army behind the Lech and wiped it out, saving the city of Augsburg and extending East Frankish territory eastward.
960		Burkhard, Margrave of Austria was created margrave of the Eastern March, comprising territories recently conquered from the Hungarians, under the lordship of the Duchy of Bavaria and its duke, his sister-in-law's husband Henry II, Duke of Bavaria.
976		Henry II, duke of Bavaria, launched a revolt in his duchy against Otto II, Holy Roman Emperor, the emperor of the Holy Roman Empire. Burkhard joined him.
976		Otto II, emperor of the Holy Roman Empire, conquered Regensburg, the Bavarian capital, then in revolt.
976		An Imperial Diet of the Holy Roman Empire at Regensburg formally stripped Henry II, Duke of Bavaria of his duchy and appointed Otto I, Duke of Swabia and Bavaria, nephew of Otto II, the Holy Roman Emperor, and already duke of Swabia, duke of Bavaria.
976	21 July	Leopold I the Illustrious, Margrave of Austria, a count of Babenberg, replaced Burkhard as margrave of the Bavarian Eastern March.
984		Leopold the Illustrious captured the fortress at Melk, the last redoubt of Burkhard's partisans, and established his capital there.
987		Leopold the Illustrious conquered territory extending to the Vienna Woods.
991		Leopold the Illustrious conquered territory extending to the Fischa.
994	8 July	Leopold the Illustrious was struck in the eye by an arrow at a tournament in Würzburg.
994	10 July	Leopold the Illustrious died.
994		Otto III, Holy Roman Emperor, king of Kingdom of Germany, appointed Leopold the Illustrious's son Henry I the Strong, Margrave of Austria margrave of the Eastern March.
996	1 November	The term Ostarrîchi was first used, possibly in reference to a small fief within the Eastern March.

== 11th century ==
Year	Date	Event
1002		Henry II, Holy Roman Emperor, then duke of Bavaria and King of the Romans, added the land between the Kamp and Morava rivers and some territory southwest of Vienna to the territory of Austria.
1018	23 June	Henry the Strong died from wounds he suffered in battle against Bolesław I the Brave, duke of Poland. He was succeeded as margrave by his younger brother Adalbert the Victorious, Margrave of Austria.
1055	26 May	Adalbert the Victorious died in the Austrian capital Melk. He was succeeded by his son Ernest the Brave, Margrave of Austria.
1062	April	Coup of Kaiserswerth: Anno II, archbishop of Cologne, kidnapped the young Henry IV, Holy Roman Emperor, then King of the Romans, and demanded that his mother and regent Agnes of Poitou hand over the Imperial Regalia to his coconspirators.
1065	29 March	An accolade ceremony was held in Mainz recognizing the majority of Henry IV, Holy Roman Emperor.
1073	29 June	Saxon Rebellion: The Saxon nobility, at the head of a large army, came to the Imperial Palace of Goslar to protest the frequent stays of Henry IV, Holy Roman Emperor, king of Germany, on their territory and his promotion of local ministeriales. The king fled.
1074	2 February	Saxon Rebellion: Henry IV, Holy Roman Emperor, king of Germany signed the Treaty of Gerstungen agreeing to restore the rebel duke Otto of Nordheim in Bavaria.
1075	9 June	Battle of Langensalza (1075): Henry IV, Holy Roman Emperor, king of Kingdom of Germany, and a number of his vassals, including Ernest the Brave, destroyed a Saxon army composed largely of peasant draftees near what is now Bad Langensalza. Ernest the Brave was killed. He was succeeded by his son Leopold II the Fair, Margrave of Austria.
1075		Investiture Controversy: The pope Pope Gregory VII composed the Dictatus papae, declaring that his office was granted by God, and that he had the right to depose emperors, as well as the sole authority to appoint and transfer bishops.
1075		Investiture Controversy: Henry IV, Holy Roman Emperor, king of Germany, reasserted his right to appoint bishops in a letter in which he addressed the pope, Pope Gregory VII, as a false monk and called for his removal.
1078		Investiture Controversy: Altmann of Passau, bishop of Passau, fled to Austria following the invasion of his diocese by supporters of Henry IV, Holy Roman Emperor, the king of Germany.
1079		Investiture Controversy: Henry IV, Holy Roman Emperor, king of Germany, invaded Austria in pursuit of the fugitive bishop Altmann of Passau.
1081	6 August	Leopold the Fair supported the election at Forchheim of Hermann of Salm, count of Salm, as king of Germany in opposition to Henry IV, Holy Roman Emperor.
1081		Henry IV, Holy Roman Emperor, king of Germany, deposed Leopold the Fair and granted his territory to Vratislaus II of Bohemia, duke of Bohemia.
1082	12 May	Battle of Mailberg: A Bohemian army invading in support of the claim of Vratislaus II of Bohemia decisively defeated the Austrians at Mailberg.
1095	12 October	Leopold the Fair died. He was succeeded as margrave of Austria by his son Leopold III the Good, Margrave of Austria.

== 12th century ==
Year	Date	Event
1103		Henry IV, Holy Roman Emperor, emperor of the Holy Roman Empire, issued the Landfrieden, establishing some rules on the resolution of disputes between rulers of states of the Empire.
1104		Investiture Controversy: Henry V, Holy Roman Emperor, king of Germany and son and heir of Henry IV, Holy Roman Emperor, emperor of the Holy Roman Empire, rebelled against his father at the urging of the pope Pope Paschal II.
1104	December	Henry IV, Holy Roman Emperor, emperor of the Holy Roman Empire, was forced at an Imperial Diet at Mainz to abdicate in favor of his son Henry V, Holy Roman Emperor, then king of Germany.
1106		Leopold the Good married Agnes of Waiblingen, sister of Henry V, Holy Roman Emperor, the king of Germany.
1136	15 November	Leopold the Good died. He was succeeded as margrave of Austria by his son Leopold the Generous, Duke of Bavaria.
1137		Leopold the Generous granted the Peterskirche in Vienna to the prince-bishop of Passau in exchange for some territory outside the city.
1138	7 March	1138 Imperial election: Conrad III of Germany was elected King of the Romans at Koblenz, defeating Henry X, Duke of Bavaria, duke of Bavaria, Saxony and Spoleto and margrave of Tuscany.
1138	July	Henry X, Duke of Bavaria announced his refusal to recognize Conrad III of Germany as King of the Romans. In return, Conrad banned him and deprived him of both of his German duchies, granting Bavaria to his supporter Leopold the Generous.
1141	18 October	Leopold the Generous died. He was succeeded as margrave of Austria and duke of Bavaria by his younger brother Henry II Jasomirgott, Duke of Austria.
1145		Henry Jasomirgott established his residence in Vienna.
1156		Frederick I, Holy Roman Emperor, emperor of the Holy Roman Empire, restored the House of Welf to the Duchy of Bavaria in the person of Henry the Lion, son of Henry X, Duke of Bavaria.
1156	17 September	To compensate Babenberg for their loss of Bavaria, Frederick I, Holy Roman Emperor, emperor of the Holy Roman Empire, issued the Privilegium Minus, elevating Austria to an independent duchy.
1176	November	Henry Jasomirgott broke his hip falling with his horse from a bridge near Melk.
1177	13 January	Henry Jasomirgott died in Vienna. He was succeeded by his son Leopold V the Virtuous, Duke of Austria.
1186	17 August	Leopold the Virtuous and Ottokar IV, Duke of Styria, duke of Styria, signed the Georgenberg Pact, under which the former was to succeed the latter on his death. In exchange, Leopold the Virtuous promised to maintain the rights of the Styrian estates and citizens.
1187	2 October	Siege of Jerusalem (1187): The city of Jerusalem fell to an Ayyubid siege. The capital of the Kingdom of Jerusalem was moved to Tyre, Lebanon.
1187	29 October	Third Crusade: The pope Pope Gregory VIII issued the audita tremendi calling for a crusade to reconquer Jerusalem from the Ayyubid dynasty.
1189	August	Siege of Acre (1189–1191): Guy of Lusignan, jure uxoris king of Jerusalem, laid siege to the Ayyubid city of Acre, Israel.
1191		Siege of Acre (1189–1191): Leopold the Virtuous took command of the crusader army at Acre, Israel.
1191	July	Siege of Acre (1189–1191): Acre, Israel fell to the crusaders. The flags of Jerusalem, France, England and Austria were raised on the ramparts. Richard I of England, king of England, ordered the Austrian flag torn down.
1192	8 May	Ottokar IV, Duke of Styria, duke of Styria, died of leprosy. He was succeeded by Leopold the Virtuous.
1192		Richard I of England, king of England, was arrested in Vienna for the April murder of Conrad of Montferrat, the king of Jerusalem and cousin to Leopold the Virtuous.
1193	19 April	English king Richard I of England was released from his captivity at Trifels Castle following the payment of a substantial ransom to Austria and the Holy Roman Empire.
1194	31 December	Leopold the Virtuous died of gangrene after a botched amputation of his foot, injured at a tournament in Graz. He was succeeded as duke of Austria by one son, Frederick I the Catholic, Duke of Austria, and as duke of Styria by another, Leopold VI the Glorious, Duke of Austria.
1196		The pope Pope Celestine III censured the late Leopold the Virtuous and his house for his imprisonment and ransoming of Richard I of England, king of England and a fellow crusader.
1197	April	Crusade of 1197: Frederick the Catholic left Austria on a crusade organized by Henry VI, Holy Roman Emperor, emperor of the Holy Roman Empire, to reconquer Jerusalem for the Kingdom of Jerusalem and convince the pope Pope Celestine III to support his claim to Sicily.
1197	December	An army of Austrians and Hungarian nobles loyal to Andrew II of Hungary, then without title, defeated a Hungarian royal army at Mački.
1198		Emeric, King of Hungary, king of Hungary, was forced to appoint his younger brother Andrew II of Hungary duke in Croatia and Dalmatia.
1198	16 April	Frederick the Catholic died of illness at Acre, Israel. He was succeeded as duke of Austria by his younger brother Leopold the Glorious.
1199		Emeric, King of Hungary, king of Hungary, defeated his brother Andrew II of Hungary, duke in Croatia and Dalmatia, at Lake Balaton and forced him to flee into Austria.
1200		Andrew II of Hungary, then a refugee in Austria, was peacefully restored to power as duke in Croatia and Dalmatia.

== 13th century ==
Year	Date	Event
1205		Leopold the Glorious accepted the five-year-old Ladislaus III of Hungary, king of Hungary, and his court as refugees from his uncle and regent Andrew II of Hungary.
1205	7 May	Ladislaus III of Hungary, the five-year-old king of Hungary, died in Vienna. His uncle and regent, Andrew II of Hungary, whose cruel treatment had forced him to flee into exile, succeeded him as king.
1209		Albigensian Crusade: The pope Pope Innocent III called for a crusade against Catharism, a gnostic heresy prevalent in Languedoc, and the sympathetic count of Toulouse, Raymond VI, Count of Toulouse.
1212		Leopold the Glorious took part in an Imperial Diet at Nuremberg which deposed Otto IV, Holy Roman Emperor and elected Frederick II, Holy Roman Emperor as King of the Romans with the support of the pope Pope Innocent III.
1212	August	Albigensian Crusade: Leopold the Glorious left Vienna to participate in the crusade.
1212		Albigensian Crusade: Leopold the Glorious returned to Austria.
1213	12 July	Frederick II, Holy Roman Emperor, King of the Romans, issued the Golden Bull of 1213, a Golden Bull ceding some ecclesiastical rights to the Catholic Church.
1217	July	Fifth Crusade: Leopold the Glorious left Vienna to take part in another crusade to reconquer Jerusalem from the Ayyubid dynasty.
1218	29 May	Siege of Damietta (1218–1219): Crusader forces, including Austrian and Styrian forces, landed near the fortress of the Ayyubid city of Damietta.
1218	August	Fifth Crusade: Leopold the Glorious returned to Austria.
1221		Vienna was granted the staple right, the right to require merchants passing through to offer their goods for sale.
1230	28 July	Leopold VI the Glorious, Duke of Austria died. He was succeeded as duke of Austria and Styria by his son Frederick II the Quarrelsome, Duke of Austria.
1235		Frederick II, Holy Roman Emperor, emperor of the Holy Roman Empire, invited Bohemia to invade and conquer Austria as punishment for the aggression and impertinence of Frederick the Quarrelsome.
1235		The residents of Vienna opened the gates of the city to the Bohemian army. Frederick the Quarrelsome fled to Wiener Neustadt.
1235		Vienna was raised to a free imperial city.
1237		Mongol invasion of Europe: The army of the Golden Horde arrived at Ryazan.
1238		Frederick the Quarrelsome created two administrative divisions of Austria: Upper Austria, above the Enns, and Lower Austria below.
1239		Frederick II, Holy Roman Emperor, emperor of the Holy Roman Empire, restored Frederick the Quarrelsome as duke of Austria.
1241	15 April	Battle of Mohi: Austrian forces defeated a small Golden Horde raiding party near Muhi, then withdrew. Hungarian and Templar forces remained in the theater.
1246	15 June	Battle of the Leitha River: The Kingdom of Hungary defeated an Austrian invasion near the banks of the Leitha. Frederick the Quarrelsome was killed. His sister Margaret of Austria, Queen of Bohemia and his niece Gertrude of Austria both claimed the succession in Austria and Styria.
1246		Wenceslaus I of Bohemia, king of Bohemia, married his son and heir Vladislaus III of Moravia, margrave of Moravia, to Gertrude.
1246		The Austrian nobility gave homage to Vladislaus in support of his claim by right of his wife Gertrude.
1247	3 January	Vladislaus died.
1248		Herman VI, Margrave of Baden, margrave of Baden, married Gertrude. He laid claim to Austria and Styria by right of his wife and left his brother Rudolf I, Margrave of Baden-Baden to govern Baden.
1250	4 October	Herman died.
1250		Wenceslaus I of Bohemia, king of Bohemia, invaded Austria, possibly at the invitation of the local nobility.
1251		The Austrian nobility acclaimed Ottokar II the Iron and Golden King of Bohemia, son and heir of the king of Bohemia Wenceslaus I of Bohemia, duke.
1252	11 February	Ottokar the Iron and Golden King married Margaret.
1252	27 June	Gertrude married Roman Danylovich, son and heir of Daniel of Galicia, knyaz of Galicia and a relative of Béla IV of Hungary, king of Hungary.
1253	23 September	Wenceslaus I of Bohemia, king of Bohemia, died. He was succeeded by Ottokar the Iron and Golden King, his son.
1253		Béla IV of Hungary, king of Hungary, claimed ownership of Styria.
1253		Gertrude and Roman Danylovich were divorced.
1254		After mediation by the pope Pope Innocent IV, Ottokar the Iron and Golden King agreed to cede much of Styria to Béla IV of Hungary, king of Hungary, in exchange for the latter's recognition of his claims in Austria.
1258		Stephen V of Hungary, son and heir of Béla IV of Hungary, king of Hungary, was appointed duke of Styria.
1260		Ottokar the Iron and Golden King invaded Styria in support of a revolt by the local nobility.
1260	July	Battle of Kressenbrunn: Austrian and Bohemian forces repulsed a Hungarian attack over the Morava near modern Engelhartstetten. Many Hungarian soldiers drowned in the river.
1261		Béla IV of Hungary, king of Hungary, renounced his claim to Styria in favor of Ottokar the Iron and Golden King.
1266	29 October	Margaret died.
1273	1 October	1273 Imperial election: Rudolf I of Habsburg of Germany, count of Habsburg, was elected King of the Romans in Frankfurt, defeating Ottokar the Iron and Golden King, who refused to recognize his election.
1274	November	An Imperial Diet at Nuremberg held that all territories which had changed hands in the interregnum following the death of Frederick II, Holy Roman Emperor had to be returned.
1276		Rudolf I of Germany, King of the Romans, banned Ottokar the Iron and Golden King for failing to recognize his election and for failing to cede Austria, Styria and Carinthia to imperial administration after the extinction of the male line in each of those duchies.
1276	June	Rudolf I of Germany, King of the Romans, declared war on Ottokar the Iron and Golden King.
1276	November	Ottokar the Iron and Golden King ceded Austria, Styria, Carinthia and Carniola to the direct administration of the Holy Roman Empire. King of the Romans Rudolf I of Germany rescinded the imperial ban and restored him to the Kingdom of Bohemia.
1278		Ottokar the Iron and Golden King invaded Austria.
1278	26 August	Battle on the Marchfeld: A Holy Roman Empire and Hungarian army decisively defeated a Bohemian, Głogów and Lower Bavarian force near Dürnkrut, Austria and Jedenspeigen. Ottokar the Iron and Golden King was killed.
1282	27 December	A Hoftag at Augsburg recognized the appointment of Rudolf I of Germany's sons Albert I of Habsburg of Germany and Rudolf II, Duke of Austria as dukes jointly and severally of Austria and Styria and margraves jointly and severally of Carniola and the Windic March.
1283	1 June	The Treaty of Rheinfelden was signed at Rheinfelden, establishing the succession of Rudolf I of Germany. Albert of Habsburg was to receive the sole rule of Austria and Styria. In exchange, Rudolf II would receive some territories in Further Austria. The treaty also established primogeniture as the Habsburg order of succession.
1286		Meinhard, Duke of Carinthia, count of Tyrol and Albert of Habsburg's father in law, was made duke of Carinthia and margrave of Carniola and the Windic March as compensation for his earlier support of Rudolf I of Germany against Ottokar the Iron and Golden King.
1290	10 May	Rudolf II died.
1291	15 July	Rudolf I of Germany died.
1291	29 November	Albert II, Duke of Saxony, duke of Saxony, agreed to support the candidate of Wenceslaus II of Bohemia, king of Bohemia, in the upcoming imperial election.
1292	27 April	Adolf, King of the Romans, count of Nassau and Siegfried II of Westerburg, archbishop of Cologne signed the Treaty of Andernach, under which the latter agreed to support the former in the upcoming imperial election in exchange for significant territorial concessions.
1292	5 May	1292 Imperial election: Adolf, King of the Romans, count of Nassau, was elected King of the Romans at Frankfurt, denying the wishes of Rudolf I of Germany to see his son Albert of Habsburg elected.
1292	30 June	Adolf, King of the Romans, King of the Romans, agreed to depose Albert of Habsburg in Austria and Styria and to grant those duchies to Wenceslaus II of Bohemia, king of Kingdom of Bohemia, by force if necessary.
1292	November	Adolf, King of the Romans, King of the Romans, recognized Albert of Habsburg as duke of Austria and Styria, margrave of the Windic March, and lord of Pordenone.
1294		Adolf, King of the Romans, King of the Romans, purchased the landgraviate of Thuringia and the margravate of Meissen from Albert II, Margrave of Meissen.
1298	23 June	The Elector of Mainz, acting on behalf of himself and that of Wenceslaus II of Bohemia, king of Bohemia and Wigbold von Holte, the archbishop of Cologne, declared Adolf, King of the Romans, King of the Romans, deposed at a meeting in Mainz in the presence of some lesser nobility.
1298	2 July	Battle of Göllheim: Albert of Habsburg personally killed Adolf, King of the Romans, King of the Romans in battle at Göllheim.
1298	27 July	Albert of Habsburg was elected King of the Romans in Frankfurt.
1298	24 August	Albert of Habsburg was crowned King of the Romans at Aachen Cathedral in Aachen.
1298	21 November	Albert of Habsburg appointed his son Rudolf I of Bohemia duke of Austria and Styria jointly with himself.

== 14th century ==
Year	Date	Event
1306	4 August	Wenceslaus III of Bohemia, the last king of Bohemia of the Přemyslid dynasty, was stabbed to death in Olomouc by an unknown assassin.
1306		The Bohemian nobility elected Henry of Bohemia king.
1306		The Holy Roman Emperor Albert of Habsburg invaded Bohemia and installed Rudolf I of Bohemia on the throne.
1307	31 May	Battle of Lucka: Frederick I, Margrave of Meissen defeated the forces of the Holy Roman Empire at Lucka, preserving the rule of the House of Wettin over Thuringia.
1307	4 July	Rudolf died, probably due to complications from a preexisting gastrointestinal disease, while besieging a Bohemian rebel fortress at Horažďovice. Albert became sole duke of Austria and Styria.
1308	1 May	Albert of Habsburg was murdered at Windisch by his nephew, Rudolf II's son John Parricida, who felt that the Treaty of Rheinfelden had deprived him of his inheritance. He was succeeded by two of his sons, Frederick the Fair and Leopold I, Duke of Austria, ruling jointly as dukes of Austria and Styria.
1313		Frederick the Fair invaded Lower Bavaria in a dispute with Louis IV, Holy Roman Emperor, duke of Upper Bavaria, over who would tutor the sons of the late Stephen I, Duke of Bavaria, duke of Lower Bavaria.
1313	9 November	Battle of Gammelsdorf: The forces of Louis IV, Holy Roman Emperor, duke of Upper Bavaria, defeated those of Frederick the Fair at Gammelsdorf. Frederick the Fair was forced to renounce the tutelage of the children of the late Stephen I, Duke of Bavaria, duke of Lower Bavaria.
1314	19 October	Imperial election, October 19, 1314: Four electors of the Holy Roman Empire selected Frederick the Fair as King of the Romans at Frankfurt.
1314	20 October	Imperial election, October 20, 1314: Five electors of the Holy Roman Empire selected Louis IV, Holy Roman Emperor, duke of Upper Bavaria, as King of the Romans at Frankfurt in opposition to Frederick the Fair.
1314	25 November	Louis IV, Holy Roman Emperor, duke of Upper Bavaria, was crowned King of the Romans at Aachen.
1314	25 November	Frederick the Fair was crowned King of the Romans at the Bonn Minster in Bonn.
1315	15 November	Battle of Morgarten: A Swiss force ambushed and destroyed a Habsburg army at Ägerisee, saving the Swiss Confederacy from possible annexation to Austria.
1316		Louis IV, Holy Roman Emperor, a claimant against Frederick the Fair to the title of King of the Romans, granted the Waldstätte of the Old Swiss Confederacy independence from the House of Habsburg.
1322	28 September	Battle of Mühldorf: The forces of Louis IV, Holy Roman Emperor, duke of Upper Bavaria and a claimant to the title King of the Romans, defeated those of his rival Frederick the Fair in battle at Ampfing. Frederick the Fair was captured.
1324		The pope Pope John XXII excommunicated Louis IV, Holy Roman Emperor, duke of Upper Bavaria and a claimant in opposition to Frederick the Fair to the title King of the Romans.
1325	13 March	Frederick the Fair signed the Treaty of Trausnitz at Trausnitz Castle with his captor Louis IV, Holy Roman Emperor, duke of Upper Bavaria. Under its terms, he agreed to recognize his captor as King of the Romans in exchange for his liberty, and to convince his partisans to lay down their arms.
1325		Having failed to convince Leopold I, Duke of Austria, his younger brother and co-ruler of Austria and Styria, to abandon his war against Louis IV, Holy Roman Emperor, King of the Romans, Frederick the Fair returned to captivity in Munich.
1326	7 January	Louis IV, Holy Roman Emperor and Frederick the Fair signed the Treaty of Ulm, under which the former was to be crowned Holy Roman Emperor, but the latter would administer the Holy Roman Empire as King of the Romans.
1326	28 February	Leopold I, Duke of Austria died. Frederick the Fair left the administration of the Holy Roman Empire to return to rule Austria and Styria.
1330	13 January	Frederick the Fair died. He was succeeded by his younger brothers Albert II the Wise, the Lame, Duke of Austria and Otto the Merry, Duke of Austria, ruling jointly as dukes of Austria and Styria.
1335	2 April	Henry of Bohemia, duke of Carinthia and margrave of Carniola, died, leaving no male heirs.
1335	2 May	Albert the Wise and Otto the Merry, whose mother, Elizabeth of Carinthia, Queen of Germany was sister to Henry of Bohemia, the late duke of Carinthia, were jointly appointed dukes of Carinthia and margraves of Carniola.
1339		Otto the Merry died. He was survived by two young sons.
1344	10 August	Otto the Merry's younger son, the sixteen-year-old Leopold II, Duke of Austria, died, possibly due to poisoning.
1344	11 December	Otto the Merry's surviving son, the seventeen-year-old Frederick, died, possibly after being poisoned.
1358	16 August	Albert the Wise died. According to his will, he was succeeded by his eldest son, Rudolf IV the Founder, Duke of Austria.
1359		Rudolf the Founder ordered the creation of the Privilegium Maius, a set of forged documents, some purportedly issued by Julius Caesar, which raised Austria to an archduchy and granted it additional rights including the privilegium de non evocando, the right to issue judgments which could not be appealed to the Holy Roman Emperor.
1363		Rudolf the Founder and the childless Margaret, Countess of Tyrol signed a treaty providing for the former's inheritance of the County of Tyrol on the latter's death.
1363		Stephen II, Duke of Bavaria, duke of Bavaria, invaded Tyrol.
1364		Rudolf the Founder took the title duke of Carniola.
1365		The town of Novo Mesto was established.
1365		Albert III, Count of Gorizia died. His territories in Istria, White Carniola and the Windic March were inherited by Rudolf the Founder and added to Carniola.
1365	27 July	Rudolf the Founder died. He was succeeded by his younger brothers Albert III with the Braid, Duke of Austria and Leopold III the Just, Duke of Austria, ruling jointly as dukes of Austria, Styria and Carniola.
1368		Leopold the Just expelled Bavarian forces from County of Tyrol.
1368		The citizens of Freiburg im Breisgau purchased their independence from the count of Freiburg and submitted to Habsburg protection. The city was added to Further Austria.
1369	3 October	Margaret, Countess of Tyrol died. Albert with the Braid and Leopold the Just succeeded her jointly as counts of Tyrol.
1375	December	The mercenary Gugler army crossed the Jura Mountains into Habsburg territory.
1376	January	The Gugler were forced to retreat into France.
1376	6 August	Albert with the Braid agreed to Leopold the Just's right to make separate treaties with foreign powers.
1379		Albert with the Braid and Leopold the Just signed the Treaty of Neuberg at Neuberg Abbey, dividing their father's possessions. Albert and his descendants were to rule Austria, Leopold and his descendants Styria, Carinthia, Carniola, Tyrol, Further Austria and Friuli.
1382		The Imperial Free City of Trieste seceded from the Patriarchate of Aquileia and became part of Leopold the Just's domains in exchange for his protection.
1386	9 July	Battle of Sempach: A Swiss force decisively defeated an invasion by Leopold the Just at Sempach. Leopold was killed, along with a number of his vassals. He was succeeded by his young sons William the Courteous, Duke of Austria and Leopold IV the Fat, Duke of Austria, with his brother Albert with the Braid acting as regent.
1387	11 March	The citizens of Glarus declared themselves independent of Austrian rule.
1388	9 April	Battle of Näfels: Swiss forces decisively defeated an Austrian invasion of Glarus at Näfels.
1395	29 August	Albert with the Braid died. He was succeeded in his lands by his son Albert IV, Duke of Austria.

== 15th century ==
Year	Date	Event
1401		Appenzell Wars: A popular uprising took place in Appenzell against the rule of the prince-abbot of the Abbey of Saint Gall, an ally of the Habsburgs.
1404	14 September	Albert IV died. He was succeeded as duke of Austria by his young son Albert II the Magnanimous of Germany, with his cousin William the Courteous acting as regent.
1406	15 July	William the Courteous died without heirs. He was succeeded in Upper Austria by Leopold the Fat and in Carinthia, Styria and Carniola by another brother, Ernest the Iron, Duke of Austria. Leopold ceded Tyrol to yet another brother, Frederick IV of the Empty Pockets, Duke of Austria and replaced William as regent for Albert the Magnanimous.
1411	3 June	Leopold the Fat died. His territories were divided between Ernest the Iron and Frederick of the Empty Pockets. Albert the Magnanimous was granted his majority.
1411		Appenzell Wars: Appenzell signed a mutual defense treaty with Switzerland to secure its independence from the Abbey of Saint Gall.
1419	30 July	Hussite Wars: A Hussite procession led by the priest Jan Želivský threw seven government officials, including the burgomaster, from the New Town Hall in Prague, killing them.
1420	23 May	Albert the Magnanimous ordered the imprisonment and forcible conversion of the Jews in Austria.
1420	12 June	Battle of Vítkov Hill: A crusader force including some Austrian soldiers laid siege fortifications on a hill outside Prague.
1420	14 July	Battle of Vítkov Hill: The crusader forces were surprised and routed, ending the siege. Several hundred were killed.
1421	12 March	Two hundred Jews, the last practicing in Austria, were burned at the stake outside Vienna.
1423		Sigismund, Holy Roman Emperor, King of the Romans, king of Hungary, king of Croatia and Bohemia and Albert the Magnanimous's father-in-law, appointed Albert margrave of Moravia.
1424	10 June	Ernest the Iron died. He was survived by six children including his young sons Frederick III, Holy Roman Emperor and Albert VI, Archduke of Austria. Frederick of the Empty Pockets appointed himself regent over Ernest's territories.
1431	14 August	Battle of Domažlice: A Holy Roman Empire force, including some troops led by Albert the Magnanimous, was driven from its siege positions at Domažlice and wiped out in the nearby Bohemian Forest.
1431	14 October	Battle of Waidhofen: A Taborite raiding party was attacked and defeated by Austrian and Bohemian forces at Waidhofen an der Thaya.
1435		Frederick III claimed his majority with the support of Albert the Magnanimous.
1436		Albert VI was granted his majority.
1437	June	Transylvanian peasant revolt: A peasant revolt broke out in eastern Hungary following a demand by the local bishop György Lépes that the locals pay several years' overdue tithe in a single lump sum in the new currency.
1437	9 December	Sigismund, Holy Roman Emperor, emperor of the Holy Roman Empire, king of Hungary and king of Croatia and Bohemia, died. Albert the Magnanimous, his son-in-law, succeeded him in Hungary, Croatia and Bohemia, though the Hussite nobles in Bohemia remained in open revolt.
1438	January	Transylvanian peasant revolt: The last of the rebels, besieged in Cluj-Napoca, surrendered.
1438	18 March	1438 Imperial election: Albert the Magnanimous was elected King of the Romans at Frankfurt.
1439	24 June	Frederick of the Empty Pockets died. He was succeeded as duke of Further Austria and count of Tyrol by his young son Sigismund, Archduke of Austria, with Frederick III acting as regent.
1439	27 October	Albert the Magnanimous died at Neszmély defending Hungary against an Ottoman invasion. He was survived by two daughters and by his pregnant wife Elizabeth of Luxembourg.
1440	2 February	1440 Imperial election: Frederick III was elected King of the Romans at Frankfurt.
1440	22 February	Elizabeth of Luxembourg, Albert the Magnanimous's wife, gave birth to a son, Ladislaus the Posthumous.
1440	15 May	Ladislaus was crowned king of Hungary with the Holy Crown of Hungary by his mother in Székesfehérvár.
1440	29 June	The Diet of Hungary declared Ladislaus's coronation invalid.
1440	17 July	Władysław III of Poland, the king of Poland, was crowned king of Hungary under the eye of the Diet at Visegrád.
1440	2 November	Old Zürich War: Zürich was expelled from the Old Swiss Confederacy due to a dispute over the succession in Toggenburg.
1440	22 November	Elizabeth of Luxembourg granted Frederick III guardianship over her son Ladislaus. In exchange, she received financial support to defend her son's claim to the throne of Hungary against Władysław III of Poland.
1442		Old Zürich War: Zürich concluded an alliance with the Holy Roman Empire.
1442	18 March	Battle of Hermannstadt: A Hungarian force was defeated by a numerically superior Ottoman force near Sântimbru, Alba and force to withdraw. One of the Hungarian commanders, the bishop György Lépes, was captured and beheaded.
1442	19 December	Elizabeth of Luxembourg, mother to Ladislaus the Posthumous, died, possibly after having been poisoned.
1443	1 January	Crusade of Varna: The pope Pope Eugene IV called for a crusade to expel the Ottoman Empire from the Balkans.
1443	22 July	Battle of St. Jakob an der Sihl: A Swiss army forced imperial and Zürich forces to abandon a defensive position on the Sihlfeld outside of Zürich.
1443	3 November	Battle of Nish (1443): Hungarian, Polish and Serbian forces captured the Ottoman city of Niš.
1443	12 December	Battle of Zlatitsa: The Hungarian, Polish and Serbian armies were defeated near modern Zlatitsa, in a pass of the Balkan Mountains, halting their advance into Ottoman territory.
1444	2 January	Battle of Kunovica: An Ottoman army pursuing Hungarian, Polish and Serbian forces after their retreat from Zlatitsa were ambushed and defeated in the shadow of Suva Planina.
1444	10 November	Battle of Varna: The Ottoman Empire decisively defeated an inferior Polish-Hungarian-Wallachian force at Varna. Władysław III of Poland, king of Poland and claimant against Ladislaus the Posthumous to the throne of Hungary, was killed.
1445	1 June	The Diet of Hungary offered the throne of Hungary to Ladislaus on the condition that Frederick III release him and the Holy Crown of Hungary to their care. Frederick refused their terms and invaded.
1446		Sigismund, Archduke of Austria was granted his majority.
1446	1 June	The Hungarian nobility accepted Frederick III's guardianship over Ladislaus in exchange for a truce.
1446	6 June	The Diet of Hungary elected John Hunyadi governor of Hungary during Ladislaus's minority.
1446	12 June	Old Zürich War: Zürich and the Old Swiss Confederacy agreed to an armistice.
1448	17 February	Frederick III and the Holy See signed the Concordat of Vienna, recognizing the right of the Holy Roman Emperor to appoint bishops.
1448	3 September	The Hussite rebel George of Poděbrady captured the Bohemian capital Prague.
1448	17 October	Battle of Kosovo (1448): An allied force of Hungarians, Poles, Wallachians and Moldavians met a numerically superior Ottoman force on Kosovo field, near modern Kosovo Polje.
1448	20 October	Battle of Kosovo (1448): The Christian forces were dispersed after heavy losses.
1450	22 October	John Hunyadi and Frederick III agreed that the latter would be Ladislaus's guardian until his eighteenth birthday, in defiance of local customs which granted majority at twelve or sixteen.
1451		Frederick III recognized George of Poděbrady as governor of Bohemia.
1451		Sigismund, Archduke of Austria annexed the County of Bregenz and took the title count of Bregenz.
1452	19 March	Frederick III was crowned Holy Roman Emperor with the Imperial Crown of the Holy Roman Empire in Rome by the pope Pope Nicholas V.
1452	4 September	The Austrian nobility forced Frederick III to renounce his guardianship of Ladislaus and allow him to enter Hungary as its king.
1453	January	John Hunyadi resigned as governor of Hungary but remained in charge of collecting tax.
1453		In his capacity as Holy Roman Emperor, Frederick III confirmed the authenticity of the Privilegium Maius and raised Ladislaus the Posthumous to archduke of Austria.
1453	28 October	Ladislaus the Posthumous was crowned king of Bohemia in Prague.
1454	2 October	Battle of Kruševac: While Ottoman forces mobilized further north for an invasion of Serbia, Serbian and Hungarian forces surprised and defeated a smaller contingent at Kruševac.
1456	4 July	Siege of Belgrade (1456): Ottoman forces laid siege to what is now Belgrade.
1456	22 July	Siege of Belgrade (1456): A mostly peasant crusader force dispersed the Ottoman army and forced their withdrawal to Constantinople.
1456	11 August	John Hunyadi died of plague at what is now Zemun.
1457	23 November	Ladislaus the Posthumous died of plague or leukemia in Prague. Frederick III and Albert VI claimed his inheritance.
1458	24 January	John Hunyadi's young son Matthias Corvinus was unanimously elected king of Hungary by the Hungarian nobility.
1458	2 March	George of Poděbrady was unanimously elected king by the Bohemian estates.
1458		Albert VI conquered some territory from Frederick III in what is now Upper Austria.
1460		Sigismund, Archduke of Austria was excommunicated by the pope Pope Pius II over a territorial conflict with cardinal Nicholas of Cusa, the prince-bishop of Brixen.
1462		Albert VI supported an urban revolt in Frederick III's capital Vienna, enabling him to take possession of what is now Lower Austria.
1463	19 July	Hungary and the Holy Roman Empire signed the Peace Treaty of Wiener Neustadt. Frederick III released the Holy Crown of Hungary to the Hungarian king Matthias Corvinus in exchange for eighty thousand florins and the promise that, if Matthias died without heirs, the throne would pass to Frederick or his son Maximilian I, Holy Roman Emperor.
1463	2 December	Albert VI died. His conquests fell back to his older brother Frederick III.
1468		Bohemian–Hungarian War (1468–1478): Matthias Corvinus, the king of Hungary, invaded Bohemia on the pretext of restoring it to Catholicism.
1469		Sigismund, Archduke of Austria sold some territories on the Rhine to Charles the Bold, duke of Burgundy.
1473		Cologne Diocesan Feud: The Landstände of the Electorate of Cologne declared the archbishop, Ruprecht of the Palatinate, deposed and elevated Hermann IV of Hesse in his stead as diocesan administrator.
1474		Sigismund, Archduke of Austria purchased the County of Sonnenberg.
1474	29 July	Siege of Neuss: Burgundian forces laid siege to the free imperial city of Neuss as part of an invasion of Cologne in support of the deposed archbishop Ruprecht of the Palatinate.
1474		Burgundian Wars: Sigismund, Archduke of Austria joined Switzerland in alliance against the Duchy of Burgundy.
1474	13 November	Battle of Héricourt: An anti-Burgundian alliance including some of Sigismund, Archduke of Austria's forces defeated the Duchy of Burgundy in battle.
1474	December	Burgundian Wars: Frederick III and Louis XI of France, the king of France, signed the Treaty of Andernach, under whose terms France joined the anti-Burgundian alliance.
1475	May	Siege of Neuss: The arrival of Frederick III's forces compelled the Duchy of Burgundy to lift the siege of Neuss. The Burgundian duke Charles the Bold promised the hand of his only child, Mary of Burgundy, to Maximilian.
1477	5 January	Battle of Nancy: The Burgundian army was surrounded and wiped out by Swiss and Lorrain forces while besieging the Lorrain capital Nancy, now Nancy, France. Charles the Bold, the duke of Burgundy, was killed.
1477	11 February	The States General of the Netherlands recognized Mary of Burgundy, the daughter and only child of the deceased duke Charles the Bold, as ruler of Burgundy in exchange for her grant of the Great Privilege, which restored the ancient rights and privileges of Flanders, Brabant, Hainaut, and Holland.
1477		Frederick III raised Sigismund, Archduke of Austria to an archduke.
1477	16 August	Mary of Burgundy, the duchess regnant of Burgundy, married Maximilian.
1477		Austrian–Hungarian War (1477–1488): Hungary invaded Austria as punishment for the latter's diplomatic support of Hussite Bohemia in the Bohemian–Hungarian War.
1478	March	Bohemian–Hungarian War (1468–1478): Matthias Corvinus, king of Hungary and Vladislaus II of Hungary, king of Bohemia signed the Treaty of Brno, ending the war. Vladislaus accepted Matthias's conquests in Bohemia. Each recognized the other's right to use the title king of Bohemia.
1479	7 August	Battle of Guinegate (1479): Burgundian forces defeated a smaller French army at Enguinegatte, defending Maximilian's claim against that of the French king Louis XI of France.
1482	27 March	Mary of Burgundy died. Philip I the Handsome, the Fair of Castile, her young son and Maximilian's, succeeded as duke of Burgundy. Maximilian took over the rule of Burgundy as regent for his son.
1482	4 July	Siege of Hainburg: Hungarian forces laid siege to the Austrian city of Hainburg an der Donau.
1482		Maximilian renounced the Great Privilege.
1482	30 September	Siege of Hainburg: The garrison at Hainburg an der Donau surrendered to the Hungarian besiegers.
1482	23 December	Maximilian and the French king Louis XI of France signed the Treaty of Arras. Maximilian promised his daughter Margaret of Austria, Duchess of Savoy and the County of Burgundy to the Dauphin Charles VIII of France. In exchange, Louis recognized Philip the Handsome's rule over the rump Burgundy, consisting mostly of the County of Flanders, and Maximilian's regency.
1483	5 June	Flemish revolts against Maximilian of Austria: The cities of Flanders established a regency council for the young Philip the Handsome.
1483		Austrian–Hungarian War (1477–1488): The Hungarian advance into Austria forced Frederick III to flee Vienna and establish his court at Wiener Neustadt.
1484		Battle of Leitzersdorf: A Hungarian army forced a numerically superior Austrian force from the battlefield at Leitzersdorf.
1485	29 January	Siege of Vienna (1485): The Hungarian army laid siege to Vienna.
1485	1 June	Siege of Vienna (1485): Vienna surrendered to the Hungarian besiegers. The Hungarian king Matthias Corvinus entered the city and established his court there.
1485	6 July	Flemish revolts against Maximilian of Austria: The rebels released Philip the Handsome to his father Maximilian.
1486		Siege of Wiener Neustadt: Hungarian forces laid siege to the Austrian city of Wiener Neustadt.
1486	16 February	1486 Imperial election: Frederick III's son Maximilian was elected to succeed him as King of the Romans.
1486		The Guldengroschen, a fine one-ounce silver coin, was first minted under Sigismund, Archduke of Austria.
1486	4 October	Siege of Retz: The Hungarian army laid siege to the Austrian city of Retz.
1486	10 October	Siege of Retz: The Hungarian king Matthias Corvinus entered the city.
1487		Frederick III fled Wiener Neustadt for Graz.
1487		The Hungarian king Matthias Corvinus took the title duke of Austria at a diet of the Lower Austrian estates in Ebenfurth.
1487	2 July	Siege of Wiener Neustadt: The Hungarian king Matthias Corvinus and the defenders of Wiener Neustadt agreed that if imperial reinforcements arrived by August 16, the besiegers would withdraw; otherwise, the city would surrender.
1487	17 August	Siege of Wiener Neustadt: Wiener Neustadt surrendered to its Hungarian besiegers.
1487	November	Flemish revolts against Maximilian of Austria: A second revolt against Maximilian's rule over Burgundy began, in Ghent.
1488	8 January	Maximilian issued a decree establishing the Royal Netherlands Navy.
1488	14 February	At the urging of Frederick III, the Swabian League, a mutual defense association of imperial estates, was established at Esslingen am Neckar.
1488	16 December	Austrian–Hungarian War (1477–1488): Representatives of Hungary and the Holy Roman Empire signed an armistice at Sankt Pölten, ending the war.
1489	11 September	The pope Pope Innocent VIII excommunicated and deposed Ferdinand I of Naples, the king of Naples, following his refusal to pay feudal dues and offered the kingdom to Charles VIII of France, the king of France, who had a claim through descent from his grandfather.
1490		The Tyrolean nobility forced Sigismund, Archduke of Austria to abdicate in favor of Maximilian.
1490	6 April	The Hungarian king Matthias Corvinus died, probably from a stroke. He was survived by one child, his illegitimate son John Corvinus.
1490	15 July	Vladislaus II of Hungary, king of Bohemia, was elected king of Hungary by the Hungarian diet.
1491	7 November	Maximilian and Vladislaus II of Hungary, the king of Hungary, signed the Peace of Pressburg in what is now Bratislava. Vladislaus renounced Hungary's conquests in Austria and promised the throne to Maximilian in the event of his death without heirs. In return, Maximilian recognized Vladislaus's rule in Hungary.
1491	6 December	Charles VIII of France, the king of France, married Anne of Brittany, duchess of Brittany.
1492		Flemish revolts against Maximilian of Austria: The second revolt was suppressed.
1493	May	Maximilian and Charles VIII of France, the king of France, signed the Treaty of Senlis at Senlis, under whose terms the French king returned the Burgundian territories he had won by the Treaty of Arras. Philip the Handsome was granted his majority and became ruler of the disputed territories.
1493	19 August	Frederick III bled to death following the amputation of his infected left leg.
1494	25 January	Ferdinand I of Naples died of colorectal cancer. He was succeeded as king of Naples by his son Alfonso II of Naples.
1494	16 March	Maximilian married Bianca Maria Sforza, the niece of Ludovico Sforza, the regent of Milan, receiving a dowry of four hundred thousand ducats.
1494	21 October	Gian Galeazzo Sforza, the duke of Milan, died, probably poisoned on the orders of his uncle and regent Ludovico Sforza.
1494	22 October	Ludovico Sforza was crowned duke of Milan over the objection of Alfonso II of Naples, the king of Naples, who claimed the duchy by his daughter's marriage to the previous duke Gian Galeazzo Sforza. Ludovico Sforza invited Charles VIII of France, the king of France, to pass through Milanese territory on the way to a planned invasion of Naples.
1495	2 February	Diet of Worms (1495): A session of the Imperial Diet opened at Worms, Germany.
1495	February	Italian War of 1494–1498: French forces conquered the Neapolitan capital Naples.
1495	31 March	Italian War of 1494–1498: The Papal States, Venice, Aragon and Sicily and the Holy Roman Empire established the League of Venice, an anti-French military alliance.
1495	7 August	Diet of Worms (1495): The Diet concluded with the publication of three major reforms to the constitution of the Holy Roman Empire. The Ewiger Landfriede banned the use of violence to resolve disputes between the lesser nobility. The Reichskammergericht, a permanent high court which heard civil cases, was established. The Common Penny, a tax reform, was passed, which established a poll tax, income tax and property tax on all residents of the Empire.
1496		The Jews were expelled from Styria and Wiener Neustadt.
1496	20 October	Philip the Handsome married Joanna of Castile, the third child of Isabella I of Castile, the queen regnant of Castile, and Ferdinand II of Aragon, the king of Aragon.
1497	4 October	John, Prince of Asturias, the heir apparent to the thrones of Castile and Aragon, died without issue. His older sister Isabella of Aragon, Queen of Portugal succeeded as heir apparent.
1498	7 April	Italian War of 1494–1498: Charles VIII of France, the king of France, died, probably from an epidural hematoma after bumping his head on a doorframe, effectively ending the war.
1498	23 August	Isabella of Aragon, Queen of Portugal, the heir apparent to the thrones of Castile and Aragon, died giving birth to a son, Miguel da Paz, Prince of Portugal, who became the new heir to the two thrones.
1499	20 January	Swabian War: Imperial and Swabian League forces occupied the Val Müstair, a strategically important pass in the Three Leagues.
1499	20 February	Battle of Hard: A Swiss force routed a Holy Roman Empire army at Hard, Austria.
1499	22 March	Battle of Bruderholz: A Swabian League raiding party was surprised and defeated by a numerically inferior Swiss force near Basel.
1499	11 April	Battle of Schwaderloh: The Swiss surprised and defeated a significantly larger Swabian League force as they burned and looted the area around Triboltingen.
1499	20 April	Battle of Frastanz: Swiss troops flanked a Swabian Letzi in the Montafon and drove out their forces.
1499	22 May	Battle of Calven: An Austrian force in the Val Müstair was attacked simultaneously in the front and rear by Three Leagues forces. Nearly half were killed, and the rest fled.
1499	22 July	Battle of Dornach: A Swiss force dispersed a division of the Holy Roman Empire near Dornach, with heavy losses on both sides. The Imperial commander was killed.
1499	22 September	Swabian War: The Swabian League and the Old Swiss Confederacy signed the Treaty of Basel, ending the war. An imperial ban placed on the Swiss cantons following their refusal to pay the Common Penny was revoked.
1500		An Imperial Diet at Augsburg established six imperial circles, administrative divisions over many of the states of the Holy Roman Empire, in order to better organize military forces and tax collection in the Empire. It also established an Imperial Government, a permanent government seated at Nuremberg composed of representatives of twenty princes of the Empire.
1500	19 July	Miguel da Paz, Prince of Portugal, the infant heir to the thrones of Castile and Aragon, died. His aunt Joanna of Castile became the new heir apparent.

== 16th century ==
Year	Date	Event
1502		Maximilian dissolved the Imperial Government of the Holy Roman Empire.
1504	26 November	Isabella I of Castile, the queen of Castile, died. She was succeeded by her daughter, Philip the Handsome's wife, Joanna of Castile. The Castilian nobility refused the regency of Ferdinand II of Aragon, king of Aragon, Isabella's widower and father to the purportedly mentally ill Joanna, and summoned Philip to take the throne.
1506	January	Philip the Handsome was shipwrecked off the coast of Dorset on his way to claim the throne of Castile and taken into the custody of Henry VII of England, the king of England.
1506	30 April	Philip the Handsome and Henry VII of England, the king of England, signed the Malus Intercursus, under which the former agreed to return to the latter all Yorkist fugitives in Burgundy and to open Burgundy completely to English trade in textiles.
1506	28 June	Philip the Handsome signed the Treaty of Villafáfila, under which he recognized the incapacity of his wife Joanna of Castile, and was recognized in turn by his father-in-law Ferdinand II of Aragon, king of Aragon, as jure uxoris king of Castile and lord of the Spanish West Indies.
1506	25 September	Philip the Handsome died of typhoid at Burgos. He was succeeded as duke of Burgundy by his young son Charles V, Holy Roman Emperor.
1506		Ferdinand II of Aragon, king of Aragon, with the support of Francisco Jiménez de Cisneros, the archbishop of Toledo, became regent of Castile for his daughter Joanna of Castile.
1507		Maximilian appointed his daughter Margaret of Austria, Duchess of Savoy regent of the Netherlands for the young Charles.
1508	February	War of the League of Cambrai: Maximilian invaded Venice with the aim of reconquering the Romagna for the Papal States.
1508	4 February	Unable to reach Rome, and with the consent of the pope Pope Julius II, Maximilian took the title elected Holy Roman Emperor at Trento.
1508	10 December	War of the League of Cambrai: The Papal States, the Holy Roman Empire, France and Aragon concluded a military alliance for the destruction and partition of Venice. The House of Habsburg would receive Istria, Verona, Vicenza, Padua and Friuli.
1509	February	Joanna of Castile, the queen of Castile, was sequestered in the Royal Convent of Santa Clara in Tordesillas.
1509	May	War of the League of Cambrai: Following the collapse of the Venetian army at the hands of the French, forces of the Holy Roman Empire entered the territory granted to them under the partition.
1509	17 July	War of the League of Cambrai: A revolt in Padua expelled the garrison of the Holy Roman Empire and returned the city to Venetian control.
1509	15 September	Siege of Padua: French and Holy Roman Empire forces laid siege to Padua.
1509	30 September	Siege of Padua: Unable to pay his mercenaries, Maximilian lifted the siege.
1511	October	Maximilian joined Venice and the Papal States in a military alliance against the French.
1513	16 August	Battle of the Spurs: French forces attempting to break an English and Holy Roman Empire siege of Thérouanne were met by the besiegers at modern Enguinegatte and routed with heavy casualties.
1513	7 October	Battle of La Motta (1513): An Aragonese and Holy Roman Empire force decisively defeated a Venetian attack at Schio.
1515	22 July	First Congress of Vienna: Philip the Handsome's younger son Ferdinand I, Holy Roman Emperor married Anne of Bohemia and Hungary, the eldest child of Vladislaus II of Hungary, king of Hungary as well as king of Bohemia and Croatia. Philip's daughter Mary of Hungary married Vladislaus's other child, his son Louis II of Hungary.
1516	23 January	Ferdinand II of Aragon, the king of Aragon, died. He was succeeded in Aragon, Catalonia, Valencia, Naples, Sicily and Sardinia by his daughter Joanna of Castile and as regent of Castile by Francisco Jiménez de Cisneros, the archbishop of Toledo.
1516	March	Charles was proclaimed king of Castile and Aragon and the Aragonese kingdoms Valencia, Naples, Sicily and Sardinia and prince of Catalonia ruling jointly with his mother Joanna of Castile, who remained imprisoned.
1516	12 March	A rebellion by John III of Navarre, the deposed jure uxoris king of Navarre, against the rule of Charles was defeated.
1516	13 March	Vladislaus II of Hungary died. He was succeeded as king of Hungary and king of Bohemia and Croatia by his son Louis II of Hungary.
1516	13 August	War of the League of Cambrai: Charles and Francis I of France, the king of France, signed the Treaty of Noyon, under which the former accepted France's conquests in Northern Italy and the latter recognized Spain's possessions in Southern Italy. Charles further agreed to an audience with Catherine of Navarre, the deposed queen of Navarre, regarding the restoration of her territories.
1517	31 October	Martin Luther, a professor of moral theology at the University of Wittenberg, now part of the Martin Luther University of Halle-Wittenberg, published the Ninety-five Theses, which criticized the Church practice of selling indulgences.
1518	February	The Castilian Cortes accepted Charles in exchange for his promise to learn Spanish and to refrain from taking precious metals out of Castile or appointing foreign officers.
1519	12 January	Maximilian died. He was succeeded as archduke of Austria by Charles.
1519		Revolt of the Brotherhoods: A council consisting of one representative from each of the thirteen Germanies of Valencia expelled the municipal government of Valencia, Spain.
1519	28 June	1519 Imperial election: Charles was elected King of the Romans.
1520	16 April	Revolt of the Comuneros: Rioters in Toledo, Spain, opposed to Charles' election as King of the Romans and his burdensome tax policy, expelled his appointed city councilors and elected a citizens' committee.
1520	20 May	Charles left Castile for Germany to accept his election as King of the Romans, leaving Pope Adrian VI, then Grand Inquisitor of Castile and Aragon, in charge in Spain.
1520	15 June	The pope Pope Leo X issued the papal bull Exsurge Domine, calling on Martin Luther to recant the Ninety-five Theses or face excommunication.
1521	28 January	Diet of Worms: An Imperial Diet of the Holy Roman Empire convened at Worms, Germany to address the writings of Martin Luther.
1521		Diet of Worms: Charles abdicated as archduke of Austria in favor of his younger brother Ferdinand I, Holy Roman Emperor.
1521	23 April	Battle of Villalar: Forces loyal to Charles, in command of superior cavalry and firepower, dispersed a force of rebel comuneros at Villalar de los Comuneros and captured their leaders.
1521	May	A force of Navarrese and Gascon exiles led by Henry II of Navarre, son of the deposed queen Catherine of Navarre, invaded Navarre from France.
1521	25 May	Diet of Worms: Charles issued the Edict of Worms, making outlaws of Martin Luther and anyone who would harbor him or defend his writings.
1521	June	Italian War of 1521–1526: The Imperial Army of the Holy Roman Empire invaded northern France.
1521	30 June	Battle of Noáin: The bulk of the army dedicated to Navarrese independence under Henry II of Navarre was defeated by a vastly superior Castilian-Aragonese force.
1521	18 July	Battle of Almenara (1521): Forces of the rebel Germanies of Valencia were defeated by a royal army at Almenara, Castellón.
1521	30 August	Battle of Oriola (1521): The Germanies, now riven by internal dissent, were decisively defeated by a royal army at Orihuela, suffering two thousand dead.
1521	25 October	Revolt of the Comuneros: Charles agreed to respect the lives and property of the remaining comuneros in Toledo, Spain in exchange for their surrender.
1521	1 November	Revolt of the Brotherhoods: Valencia, Spain was reconquered by Valencian royal forces.
1521	28 November	Italian War of 1521–1526: Henry VIII of England, the king of England, and Pope Leo X, the pope, joined a treaty of alliance with the Holy Roman Empire against France.
1522	27 April	Battle of Bicocca: A French force of Swiss mercenaries advancing under heavy artillery fire failed to dislodge Holy Roman Empire forces from Bicocca in Milan.
1523		Siege of Fuenterrabía (1523–1524): Castilian and Aragonese forces laid siege to Hondarribia, where remained forces loyal to Henry II of Navarre and to the independence of Navarre.
1523	October	Italian campaign of 1524–25: The French king Francis I of France crossed the Alps into Northern Italy at the head of army forty thousand strong.
1524		Siege of Fuenterrabía (1523–1524): The occupants of the castle at Hondarribia surrendered to the besiegers.
1524	30 April	Battle of the Sesia (1524): Holy Roman Empire forces intercepted and decisively defeated a French force withdrawing from Lombardy.
1525	24 February	Battle of Pavia: After a precipitate attack, a French force was surrounded and destroyed by Holy Roman Empire artillery at Visconti Park. The French king Francis I of France was captured.
1526	14 January	Italian War of 1521–1526: The French king Francis I of France, in captivity in Madrid, and Charles, the Holy Roman Emperor, signed a treaty under which Francis renounced all his claims in Italy, Flanders and Artois, surrendered Burgundy to Charles, and agreed to withdraw his support from Henry II of Navarre, claimant to the throne of Navarre.
1526	27 February	A group of Lutheran princes of the Holy Roman Empire concluded the League of Torgau, a mutual agreement not to abide by the Edict of Worms, at Torgau.
1526	22 May	The pope Pope Clement VII released Francis I of France, the king of France, from his obligations under the Treaty of Madrid, which he had signed under duress, and concluded an anti-Habsburg alliance which also included Venice, Florence and Milan.
1526	25 June	Diet of Speyer (1526): An Imperial Diet of the Holy Roman Empire convened at Speyer to address the rise of Lutheranism.
1526	27 August	Diet of Speyer (1526): The Imperial Diet unanimously suspended the Edict of Worms, which had placed a death sentence on Martin Luther and his followers, until a council could be convened to resolve the dispute between Luther and the Catholic Church.
1526	29 August	Battle of Mohács: A Hungarian army met an Ottoman invasion at Mohács. After breaking the Hungarian left flank, the Ottoman army surrounded and destroyed the Hungarian and killed Louis II of Hungary, the king of Hungary and king of Bohemia.
1526	24 October	The Bohemian diet elected Ferdinand king.
1526	10 November	John Zápolya, the voivode of Transylvania, was elected king of Hungary by the Diet at Székesfehérvár.
1526	17 December	A rump Diet elected Ferdinand king of Hungary at Bratislava.
1527	1 January	Election in Cetin: The Croatian nobility unanimously elected Ferdinand king at Cetin Castle.
1527		Hungarian campaign of 1527–1528: Ferdinand invaded Hungary to press his claim to the throne against John Zápolya, then tied up suppressing a rebellion in the country's south.
1527	30 April	War of the League of Cognac: England joined the anti-House of Habsburg League of Cognac.
1527	1 May	Battle of Szőlős: The Serb commander Jovan Nenad defeated an army loyal to John Zápolya, the claimant against Ferdinand to the throne of Hungary, near Seleuș.
1527	6 May	Sack of Rome (1527): After the failure of the Holy Roman Empire to pay them, the Landsknechte mutinied, sacked Rome and forced the pope Pope Clement VII to fortify himself inside the Castel Sant'Angelo.
1527	6 June	Sack of Rome (1527): The pope Pope Clement VII surrendered to his besiegers, promising four hundred thousand ducati to the Landsknechte and the cities of Parma, Piacenza, Civitavecchia and Modena to the Holy Roman Empire in exchange for his life.
1527	25 July	Battle of Sződfalva: The Serb commander Jovan Nenad was defeated and killed by a Hungarian army of John Zápolya.
1527	27 September	Battle of Tarcal: Ferdinand's partisans routed an army led by John Zápolya, his rival claimant to the Hungarian throne.
1528	20 March	Battle of Szina: Ferdinand's forces decisively defeated the army of John Zápolya, his rival in the struggle for the Hungarian succession. Zápolya was forced to flee into Poland.
1528	April	Siege of Naples (1528): French and allied forces laid siege by land and sea to Naples, capital of the Aragonese kingdom of Naples.
1528	28 April	Battle of Capo d'Orso: In a four-hour battle, a Spanish fleet attempting to break the French blockade of Naples was decisively defeated, losing nine ships and over a thousand men.
1528	August	Siege of Naples (1528): The League of Cognac abandoned the siege due to an outbreak of disease and were intercepted by Holy Roman Empire forces during their retreat
1529	15 March	Diet of Speyer (1529): An Imperial Diet of the Holy Roman Empire was convened at Speyer to address Ottoman gains in Europe and the rise of Lutheranism. Ferdinand, on behalf of his brother Charles, the Holy Roman Emperor, called for the reinstatement of the ban on Martin Luther and his followers and condemned the religious innovations that had taken place in the Imperial Estates.
1529	19 April	Protestation at Speyer: Six princes of the Holy Roman Empire and the representatives of fourteen free imperial cities issued a letter to the Imperial Diet declaring their refusal to accept its authority in spiritual matters.
1529	10 May	Suleiman I's campaign of 1529: The Ottoman Empire invaded Hungary in support of John Zápolya's claim to the throne against Ferdinand.
1529	21 June	Battle of Landriano: A Spanish force destroyed the French army in Italy at Landriano.
1529	5 August	War of the League of Cognac: France and the Holy Roman Empire signed a treaty at Cambrai ending the former's participation in the war and affirming its 1526 cession of Artois, Flanders and Tournai.
1529	August	War of the League of Cognac: The pope Pope Clement VII signed a treaty at Bologna with Charles, ending their conflict. Clement received the cities of Ravenna and Cervia and in exchange agreed to crown Charles Holy Roman Emperor and to join him in the overthrow of the republican government in Florence.
1529	8 September	Suleiman I's campaign of 1529: Ottoman forces captured Buda. John Zápolya was again crowned king of Hungary.
1529	27 September	Siege of Vienna: Some hundred thousand Ottoman soldiers led by the sultan Suleiman the Magnificent laid siege to the Austrian capital Vienna.
1529	15 October	Siege of Vienna: Following the failure of a massive assault on the city and several weeks of bad weather, Ottoman forces withdrew from Vienna.
1529	24 October	Siege of Florence (1529–30): Spanish, Holy Roman Empire and papal forces made camp outside of Florence.
1530		Siege of Florence (1529–30): The Holy Roman Empire took the city of Volterra, cutting off Florence's primary supply line.
1530	3 August	Battle of Gavinana: After some early successes against forces of the Holy Roman Empire, the Florentine army was beaten and destroyed by their reinforcements.
1531	5 January	1531 Imperial election: Ferdinand was elected King of the Romans. The prince-electors agreed to elect Charles's preferred candidate, his young son Philip II of Spain, to succeed Ferdinand.
1531	27 February	Philip I, Landgrave of Hesse, the landgrave of Hesse, and John Frederick I, Elector of Saxony, the elector of Saxony, established the Schmalkaldic League, a mutual defense treaty of Lutheran princes against the Holy Roman Empire.
1532	5 August	Siege of Güns: Ottoman forces laid siege to Kőszeg, a Hungarian town loyal to Ferdinand, on the border of Austria.
1532	23 August	Siege of Güns: The Ottoman army withdrew into eastern Hungary following the failure of the siege and the mustering of a formidable Holy Roman Empire army in Vienna.
1532	19 September	Battle of Leobersdorf: An Ottoman cavalry brigade attempting to join the advance of the main army into eastern Hungary was intercepted and wiped out by Austrian forces in a mountain pass near Leobersdorf.
1533	22 July	Austria and the Ottoman Empire signed the Treaty of Constantinople, ending their conflict. Ferdinand recognized John Zápolya as king of Hungary in exchange for Ottoman recognition of his conquests in the west of the kingdom, signaling its de facto division into the Eastern Hungarian Kingdom, a vassal state of the Ottoman Empire, and Royal Hungary.

== 17th century ==
Year	Date	Event
1601	3 August	Battle of Guruslău: A force of Hungarians, Wallachians and Cossacks defeated the rebel Transylvanian prince Sigismund Báthory on the plain of the Guruslău River.
1604	28 September	Bocskai uprising: The Hungarian nobleman Stephen Bocskai launched a revolt against Habsburg dominion over Hungary.
1606	23 June	Bocskai uprising: The Hungarian nobleman Stephen Bocskai and Rudolf II, Holy Roman Emperor, the Holy Roman Emperor, king of Bohemia, Hungary and Croatia and archduke of Austria, signed the Treaty of Vienna, naming the former prince of Transylvania and granting some additional rights to religious minorities in Hungary.
1606	11 November	Long Turkish War: The Peace of Zsitvatorok was signed in what is now Radvaň nad Dunajom, ending a long conflict between the Ottoman Empire and the Holy Roman Empire. The obligations of the Hungarian nobility to their Ottoman suzerains were reduced.
1608	25 June	Rudolf's younger brother Matthias, Holy Roman Emperor, the governor of Austria, with the support of the nobility in Austria, Hungary and Moravia, forced him to cede the rule of those lands.

== 18th century ==
Year	Date	Event
1701	9 July	Battle of Carpi: An Austrian army dispatched a small French force at Carpi, near Legnago, during its crossing into Italy.
1701	1 September	Battle of Chiari: An Austrian force dealt severe and disproportionate casualties to a French army attempting to dislodge it at Chiari, Lombardy.
1701	7 September	England, the Holy Roman Empire and the Dutch Republic signed the Treaty of The Hague, reestablishing the Grand Alliance and setting out their primary goals: the establishment of Austrian control over Spanish territories in Italy and the Spanish Netherlands and Dutch and English access to markets in the Spanish Empire.
1702	1 February	Battle of Cremona: Austrian forces entered the French-held city of Cremona but, failing to take the citadel of the city and facing the arrival of French reinforcements, withdrew.
1702	15 August	Battle of Luzzara: An Austrian force under the general Prince Eugene of Savoy crossed the Po at Luzzara but failed to dislodge the French from their position despite heavy casualties on both sides.

== 19th century ==
Year	Date	Event
1801	9 February	War of the Second Coalition: France and Francis II, Holy Roman Emperor, the latter acting as emperor of the Holy Roman Empire and as king of Hungary, Bohemia and Croatia and archduke of Austria, signed the Treaty of Lunéville, ending their conflict. France made territorial gains, including the extension of its border with the Holy Roman Empire east to the Rhine.
1804	11 August	Francis took the title Emperor of Austria.
1805	25 September	Ulm Campaign: A French-Bavarian force crossed the Rhine into Germany.
1805	8 October	Battle of Wertingen: A French army surprised and defeated a much smaller Austrian force at Wertingen.
1805	9 October	Battle of Günzburg: A French force captured a Danube river crossing at Günzburg. Austrian forces failed to retake it, suffering heavy casualties, and withdrew.

== 20th century ==
Year	Date	Event
1901	18 January	1900–1901 Cisleithanian legislative election: The last round of elections were held to the Imperial Council. Ethnic nationalist parties won the majority of seats.
1901	2 October	1901 Hungarian parliamentary election: Voting began in elections to the Hungarian Diet. Voting ended on 9 October, with the liberal Liberal Party won a supermajority of seats.
1907	14 May	1907 Cisleithanian legislative election: The first round of elections was held to the Imperial Council.
1907	23 May	Cisleithanian legislative election, 1907: The runoff elections to the Imperial Council were held. The conservative Christian Social Party won a plurality of seats.
1919	10 September	The First Austrian Republic was created after the signing of the Treaty of Saint-Germain-en-Laye.
1938	13 March	Nazi Germany annexed Austria on.
1945		Soviet Union liberates Austria from Nazi Germany.
1975		Niki Lauda wins the 1975 Formula One season against James Hunt.
1995	1 January	Austria joined the European Union.

== 21st century ==
Year	Date	Event
2002	August	2002 European floods: Heavy rains resulted in destructive flooding in Salzburg and Upper Austria.
2002	7 September	Knittelfeld Putsch: An agreement between Jörg Haider, Landeshauptmann of Carinthia and an elder statesman of the Freedom Party of Austria (FPÖ), and Susanne Riess, the party chair, was symbolically torn up at a party meeting at Knittelfeld.
2002	8 September	Knittelfeld Putsch: Riess, finance minister Karl-Heinz Grasser, and Peter Westenthaler, until then chairman of the party's caucus in Parliament, resigned from the FPÖ.
2002	24 November	2002 Austrian legislative election: The Christian democratic Austrian People's Party (ÖVP) gained twenty-seven seats in elections to the National Council, largely at the expense of the FPÖ.
2004	25 April	2004 Austrian presidential election: Heinz Fischer of the social democratic Social Democratic Party of Austria (SPÖ) was elected president with fifty-two percent of the vote.
2019	20 May	Niki Lauda dies
