= Treaty of Andernach =

Treaty of Andernach can refer to one of several treaties signed in Andernach, Germany:

- Treaty of Andernach (1292)
- Treaty of Andernach (1474)
