= 19 October 1314 imperial election =

- 19 October 1314

4 Prince-electors (Note: This assembly consisted of four of the seven total Prince-electors. A rival assembly was held in Frankfurt the following day with five electors; both assemblies claimed the electoral seats of Saxony and the Bohemia.) 4 votes needed to win (Note: Four votes were required to establish an absolute majority of the seven recognized electoral seats.)
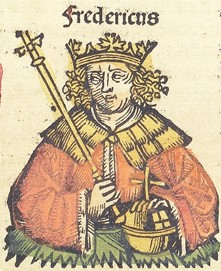
Candidate	Frederick the Fair
House	Habsburg
Electoral vote	4
Percentage	100%
King before election
Henry VII
House of Luxembourg
Elected King
Frederick the Fair (Note: Result disputed by the rival assembly in Frankfurt.)
House of Habsburg

The imperial election of 19 October 1314 was an imperial election held to select the emperor of the Holy Roman Empire. It took place in Sachsenhausen, near Frankfurt.

The election was called by Heinrich II, Count of Virneburg, at the time Archbishop of Cologne and former member of the pro-Luxembourg party, to decide the successor of Emperor Henry VII, died while in Italy on 24 August 1313. Henry's son John, King of Bohemia since 1310, was considered by many prince-electors to be too young, and by others to be already too powerful. Many nobles preferred instead Frederick the Fair, Duke of Austria and Styria and son of Henry VII's predecessor Albert I.

== Electors ==
Of seven electors, only four attended the meeting, one of whom was disputed:

- Henrich II, Archbishop-Elector of Cologne
- Rudolf I, Elector Palatine
- Rudolf I, Duke of Saxe-Wittenberg, Elector of Saxony
- Henry, Duke of Carinthia, deposed King-Elector of Bohemia, who still claimed the title

== Legacy ==
As a result of the election, Frederick the Fair was elected Holy Roman Emperor. However, due to the unrecognized claim of Henry of Carinthia, the election was considered invalid by the other electors, that the day after elected Louis IV, Duke of Bavaria as Holy Roman Emperor.
