= 20 October 1314 imperial election =

- 20 October 1314

5 Prince-electors (Note: This assembly consisted of five of the seven total Prince-electors. A rival assembly had been held in Sachsenhausen the previous day with four electors; both assemblies claimed the electoral seats of Saxony and the Bohemia.) 4 votes needed to win (Note: Four votes were required to establish an absolute majority of the seven recognized electoral seats.)
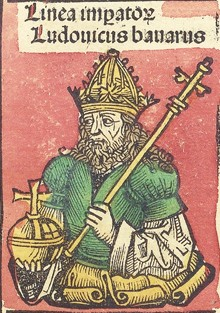
Candidate	Louis IV
House	Wittelsbach
Electoral vote	5
Percentage	100%
King before election
Henry VII
Luxembourg
Elected King
Louis IV (Note: Result disputed by the rival assembly in Sachsenhausen.)
Wittelsbach

The imperial election of 20 October 1314 was an imperial election held to select the emperor of the Holy Roman Empire. It took place in Frankfurt.

Like the previous day's election, the meeting was called to elect the successor of Emperor Henry VII, who had died while in Italy on 24 August 1313. Henry's son John, King of Bohemia since 1310, was considered by many prince-electors to be too young, and by others to be already too powerful. While one day before three of the seven electors had elected Frederick the Fair, son of the late German king Albert I, the result was claimed to be invalid, due to the absence of the other four electors and the presence as fourth elector of Henry of Carinthia, the deposed King-Elector of Bohemia who still claimed the title against John.

== Electors ==
The election was presided over by Peter of Aspelt, Archbishop of Mainz and member of the pro-Luxembourg party. Of seven electors only five attended the meeting, one of whom was disputed:

- Peter of Aspelt, Archbishop-Elector of Mainz
- Baldwin of Luxembourg, brother of Henry VII and Archbishop-Elector of Trier
- John, son of Henry VII and King-Elector of Bohemia
- Waldemar of Stendal, Elector of Brandenburg
- John II of Lauenburg, claimant Elector of Saxony against Rudolf I of Wittenberg

== Civil war between two rival kings ==
As a result of the election, Louis IV, Duke of Bavaria was elected Holy Roman Emperor. However, due to the unrecognized claim of John II of Lauenburg, the election was considered invalid by the electors who supported Frederick the Fair.

The two contested elections caused the eruption of a civil war inside the Holy Roman Empire, fought between pro-Luxembourg and pro-Habsburg parties. Louis was successfully crowned at Aachen - the customary site of coronations - by the Archbishop of Mainz, while Henry II of Virneburg, who as the Archbishop of Cologne had the customary right to crown the new "King of the Romans," crowned Frederick at Bonn. In the following conflict between the kings, Louis recognized the independence of Switzerland from the Habsburg dynasty in 1316.

After several years of bloody war, victory finally seemed within the grasp of Frederick, who was strongly supported by his brother Leopold. However, Frederick's army was decisively defeated in the Battle of Mühldorf on 28 September 1322 on the Ampfing Heath, where Frederick and 1300 nobles from Austria and Salzburg were captured. Louis was finally crowned Emperor in Rome on 17 January 1328 by Senator Giacomo Colonna. At the time, the Pope resided in Avignon.
