= Battle of Sződfalva =

1527 battle

- Part of the Hungarian campaign of 1527–1528
Date	25 July 1527
Location	Sződfalva, near Szeged, Hungary
Result	Decisive Hungarian victory

Belligerents
Hungarian Kingdom of Szapolyai with the Transylvanian saxons, Transylvanian Romanians, nobblemans and peasants in the country Tisza	Serbian Empire of Jovan Nenad

Commanders and leaders
Péter Perényi voivod of Transylvania; Imre Czibak bishop	Jovan Nenad †

Strength
13,000	8,000

The Battle of Sződfalva or Battle of Sedfal field (Hungarian: Sződfalvi csata, Serbian: Бој на Седфалском пољу (Boj na Sedfalskom polju)) was fought on 25 July 1527 between voivodian Serbs, under Jovan Nenad, and the Transylvanian army of (Hungarians and Saxons). In the battle, Jovan Nenad was defeated by a much larger force, and many of his troops dispersed into Syrmia after the defeat. When Ferdinand of Austria won, the Serbs maintained an autonomous principality in the area that lasted until 1540.

== Background ==
In 1525, the Serbs of Vojvodina (who had previously ruled the area as Hungarian vassals) saw the power vacuum created by the struggle for the Hungarian throne, and decided to elevate their status from autonomous principality to full-fledged state. At first, the rebels supported János Szapolyai; however, soon the Hungarian king called for Jovan Nenad to relinquish control over the land. In response, the Serbians changed sides to Ferdinand. Jovan Nenad and his numerically inferior forces defeated two larger Hungarian forces (the first was the force led by Laszlo Casky and the second was at the Battle of Szőlős).

After the battle of Szőlős, Jovan proclaimed himself the tsar of Voivodina. The Hungarian peasants and noblemen governance by the priests and teachers took up arms against the Serbs and Szapolyai direct bishop of Imre Czibak by restoration of order.

Few Serbian soldiers still stood by Szapolyai, mainly the Lipovian Serbs.

== The battle ==
The Serbian rebels faced the entire combined strength of Transylvania and upper Hungary. They clashed with the Hungarians at Sződfalva, near Szeged, and were defeated. The army at a slow pace demoralized and only 8,000 soldiers remained of Jovan's army. The Transylvanian army numbered 12,000–13,000 soldiers composed of peasants, rebels, and Romanians. However, Jovan Nenad was able to recoup his losses and reform his army after the defeat.

In an attempt to unite with the forces of Ferdinand, Jovan Nenad was severely wounded in Szeged. In his retreat towards Senta, he was intercepted and murdered in the village of Tornjoš. Jovan Nenad's head was delivered to Zápolya and soon after his death the remainder of his army dispersed, which was the end of Jovan Nenad's liberation movement.

== Aftermath ==
Jovan Nenad, who managed to recoup his losses at Sedfal field, was later killed en route to a battle against the forces of the Hungarian king. His forces dispersed after his death and the area was given to the Serbian despots who ruled an autonomous principality subordinate to the Hungarian king.

The Serbs returned to the Ottoman Empire and took up their duties in the Ottoman army. Serbian soldiers fought in the Siege of Vienna in 1529.

== Sources ==
- Military History of Hungary, Editor: Ervin Liptai Zrínyi Military Publisher, Budapest 1985. ISBN 978-963-326-337-2
