= Sárospatak Reformed College =

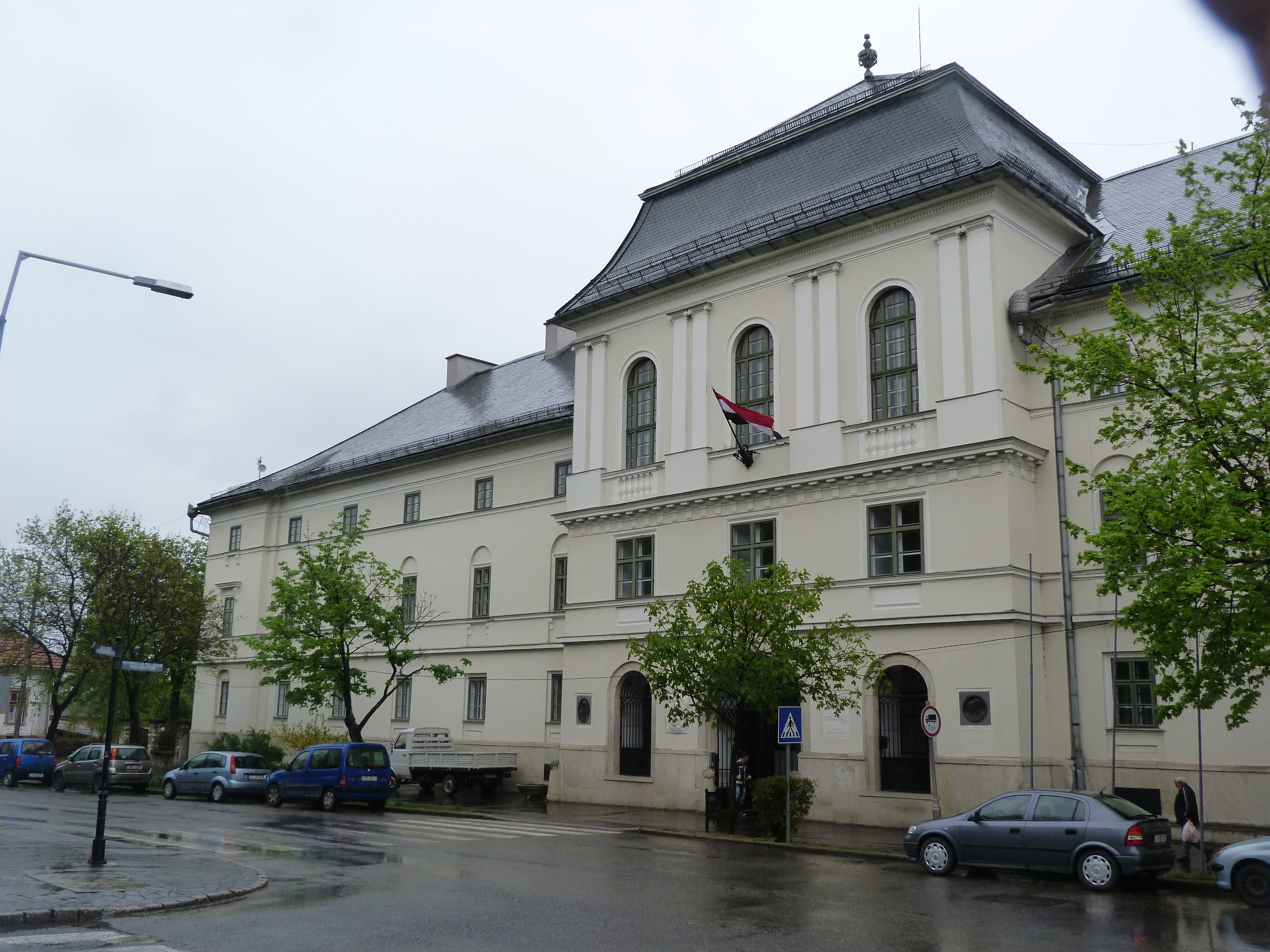
- Northern Hungary; Sárospatak, Hungary

Information
- Type: College, Gymnasium, Primary school
- Religious affiliation: Reformed Christianity
- Established: 1531
- Founder: Péter Perényi
- Website: www.reformatus-sp.edu.hu

The Sárospatak Reformed College (Hungarian: Sárospataki Református Kollégium), officially Secondary School, Primary School and Dormitory of the Sárospatak Reformed College (Hungarian: Sárospataki Református Kollégium Gimnáziuma, Általános Iskolája és Diákotthona) is a Protestant educational institute in Sárospatak, Hungary. It is one of the country's oldest educational institutions; it was founded in 1531 by Péter Perényi, in the spirit of the Reformation. Over the centuries, many of Hungary’s most prominent figures spent their school years at this school, which is considered one of the country’s most prestigious schools. It is often referred to as the "Hungarian Cambridge", since it was the first place in the country where students could earn a diploma in English.

== History ==
The school was founded in 1531 on the order of Péter Perényi. In 1550, it was reorganized as a gymnasium, after which many foreign teachers also taught in Sárospatak. New subjects began to be taught, such as rhetoric, dialectics, theology, philosophy, Ancient Greek, Latin, and Hebrew. When György I Rákóczi became Prince of Transylvania, he took charge of the college and enacted laws governing its operations. Zsuzsanna Lorántffy regarded her husband's increased attention to the school as his final wish; she moved to Sárospatak and oversaw the work being done at the school.

After Zsuzsanna Lorántffy’s death, there was no one left to support the college. When Zsófia Báthory, the widow of György II Rákóczi, Prince of Transylvania, moved into the castle of Sárospatak, she immediately took action against the Protestants. As a result, in 1671, the younger students returned home, while the older ones moved to Gyulafehérvár, where they continued their studies.

The college reopened in 1682, but their ordeal began anew when, in 1687, Imperial General Caprara expelled the Protestants from the town. Finally, in 1791, the National Assembly passed the law that enshrined the right of Protestants to freely practice their religion.

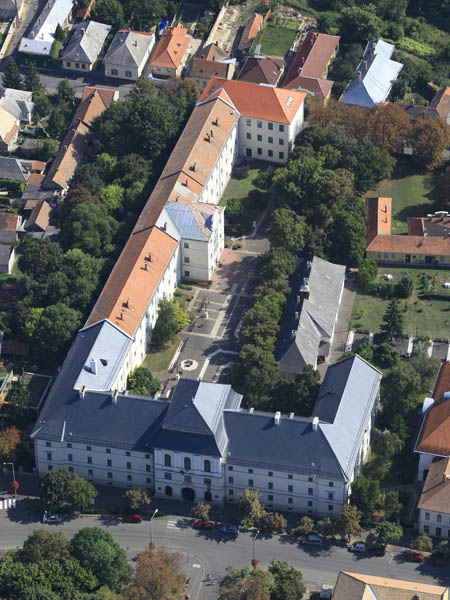
Aerial view

Despite the effects of the World War, as early as 1944-45, a few dorm rooms at the theological boarding school—with barely thirty students—and the gymnasium, with just three students, resumed operations. The school gradually filled up again; as the days went by, the number of students and teachers grew.

Between 1951 and 1952, it was gradually abolished and the autonomy of the Cistibiscan Church District was also dissolved. On July 1, 1990, the Reformed Church regained ownership of part of the school buildings, and the college's high school resumed operations in September of that year. In October 1991, after a forty-year forced hiatus, the theological academy also resumed its work as a state-recognized college of theology. The school became fully restored on September 1, 2004, with the reopening of its primary school.

== See also ==
- Reformed Church in Hungary
- Debrecen Reformed Theological University
- Sárospatak
