= 1292 imperial election =

1292 election for Holy Roman Emperor

- 5 May 1292

6 Prince-electors (Note: One of the 7 electors, Wenceslaus II of Bohemia, did not cast a vote as he held out for political and territorial concessions.) 4 votes needed to win
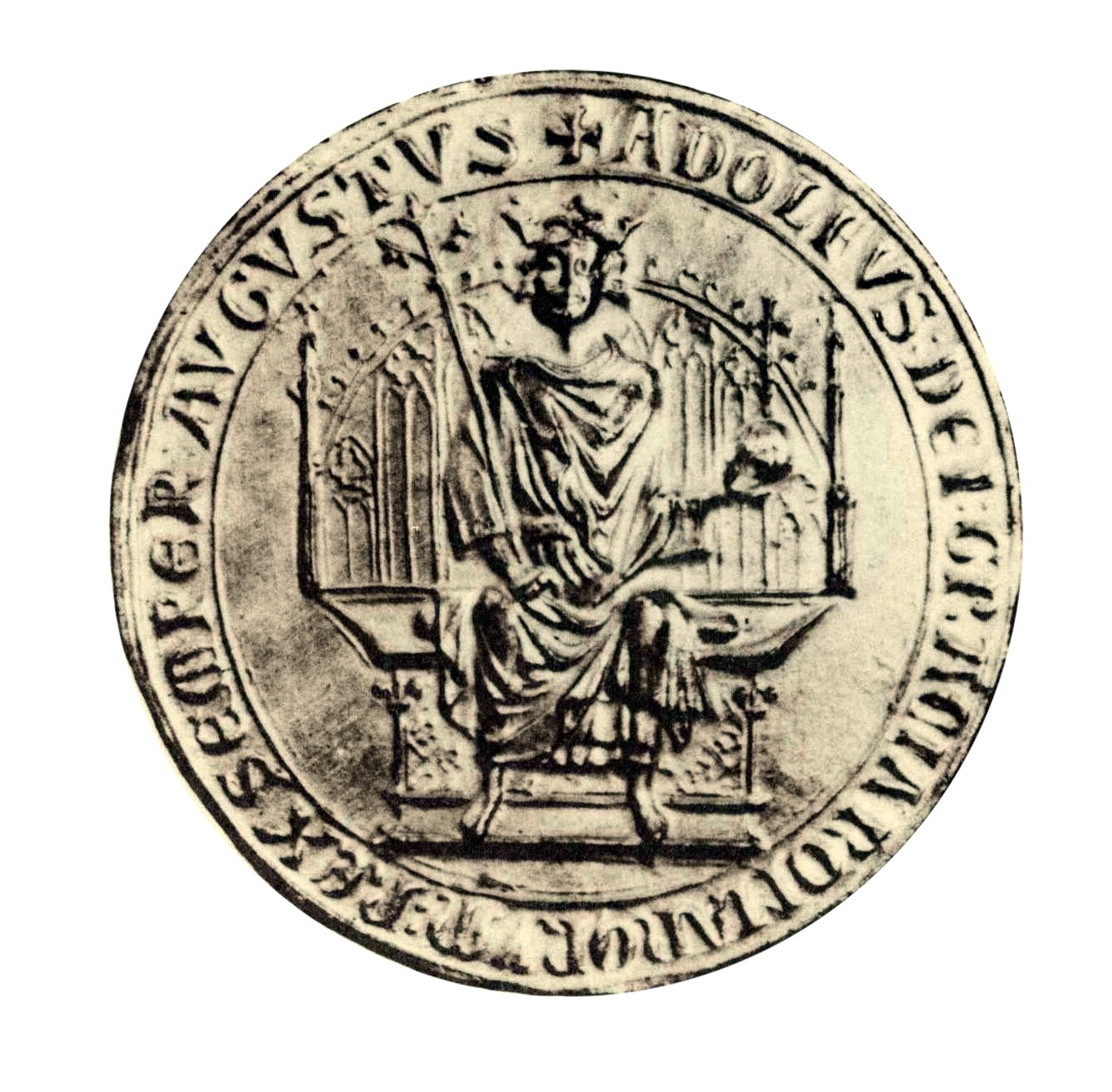

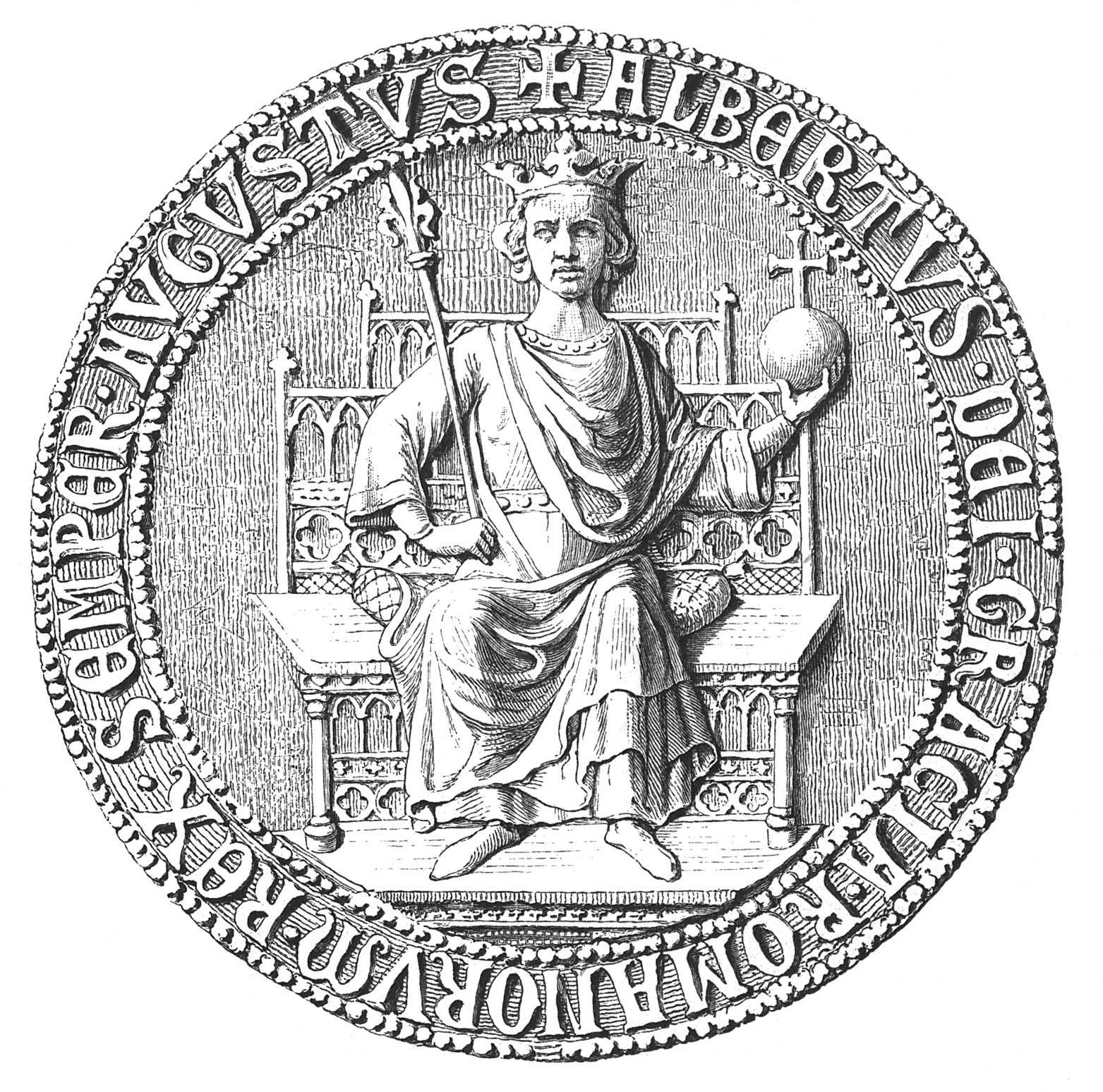
Candidate	Adolf of Nassau	Albert of Austria
House	Nassau	Habsburg
Electoral vote	6	0 (Note: Albert of Austria, the son of the previous king, was the expected successor but was rejected by the electors who feared the growing power of the Habsburgs.)
Percentage	100%
King before election
Rudolf I
House of Habsburg
Elected King
Adolf of Nassau
House of Nassau

The imperial election of 1292 was an imperial election held to select the emperor of the Holy Roman Empire. It took place in Frankfurt on May 5. Emperor Rudolf I of Germany had died on 15 July 1291.

King Wenceslaus II of Bohemia, despite his late father-in-law Rudolf's recognition of the electoral vote to him, refused to support Rudolf's son, Albert of Austria, his wife's brother. King Wenceslaus succeeded in bringing the Electors of Brandenburg and Saxony over to his side: Albert II, Duke of Saxony signed an electoral pact on 29 November 1291 that he would vote the same way as Wenceslaus; Otto IV, Margrave of Brandenburg-Stendal made a similar commitment.

Siegfried II of Westerburg, Archbishop of Cologne, believed that the Emperor should not receive the crown as an inheritance from his father, but should be freely selected by the College of Electors. He convinced Gerhard II. von Eppstein, the Archbishop of Mainz, to seek a candidate who would principally serve their interests. Gerard in turn recruited the new Archbishop of Trier, Bohemund I. Thereupon, the Elector Palatine, originally a supporter of Albert of Austria, was forced to submit to the majority of the College of Electors. Siegfried therefore proposed to the Electoral College to select Adolf of Nassau, a count, as king. They were ready to elect him, provided he make extensive concessions to the Electors and follow their political demands.

On 5 May 1292 in Frankfurt am Main, the Archbishop of Mainz, in the name of all the electors, elected Adolf King of the Germans (Emperor-Elect). As a result of the election, Adolf, King of the Romans was named King of the Romans. He was crowned in Aachen on 24 June by the Archbishop of Cologne.
