= Jovan Nenad =

Serbian military commander & ruler (c.1492–1527)

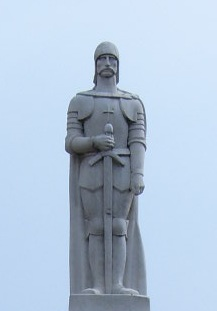
- Monument in Subotica

Emperor of the Serbs
- In office 1526–1527
- Succeeded by: Radoslav Čelnik as Duke of Syrmia

Personal details
- Born: c. 1492 Lippa, Banate of Severin, Kingdom of Hungary (now Romania)
- Died: 26 July 1527 Sedfal field, near Szeged
- Nickname: The Black

Military service
- Allegiance: Serbian Empire of Jovan Nenad
- Battles/wars: Hungarian campaign of 1527–1528; Jovan Nenad's uprising; Defense of Subotica; Subotica attack; Csanàd attack; Battle of Szőlős; Invasion of Transylvania; Battle of Tisza; Battle of Fönlaki; Battle of Sződfalva †

Jovan Nenad (Serbian Cyrillic: Јован Ненад; Hungarian: Fekete Iván or János; c. 1492 – 26 July 1527), known as "the Black", was a Serb military commander in the service of the Kingdom of Hungary who took advantage of a Hungarian military defeat at Mohács and subsequent struggle over the Hungarian throne to carve out his own state in the southern Pannonian Plain. He styled himself emperor (tsar).

Jovan Nenad is attributed by Serbian historians as the founder of Vojvodina and the leader of the last independent Serbian state before the Ottoman conquest.

== Origin ==
An ethnic Serb, he was born c. 1492 in Lipova near the Mureș River in northern Banat (present-day Romania). Other facts about his origins are uncertain; he himself claimed to be "a descendant of Serbian and Byzantine rulers", although other contemporaries thought that he was a descendant of the Serbian despots or that he was a man of low rank. He was of medium height, slender, and highly moral and pious. His contemporaries called him "the Black Man" because of a strange birthmark which many considered a divine mark: "he had a dark stripe, one finger wide, starting at the right temple of his head and running in a straight line over his body down to his right foot".

== Military career ==
In the Battle of Mohács on 29 August 1526, the Ottoman Empire destroyed the army of Hungarian-Czech King Louis Jagellion, who was killed on the battlefield. As King Louis had no children, Hungary was divided into two parties: one elected John Zápolya, a respected Hungarian noble, while the other declared for the King of Hungary a Habsburg, Ferdinand, Louis' brother-in-law. This led to a tri-partite struggle for control of Hungary between Ferdinand, Zapolya, and the Ottomans. A part of this struggle was the leader of Serb mercenaries, Jovan Nenad.

Right after Mohács, Jovan Nenad appeared between Tisza and Danube as a leader of a Serb regiment. He quickly drove the Ottomans from Bačka and parts of Banat and Syrmia, which he then ruled independently. At first he sided with the Zapolyai, but after the Hungarian nobility of Bačka estranged him from John Zápolya, who also refused to acknowledge Nenad's territory, he decided to support the Habsburg pretender, Ferdinand, in the beginning of 1527. The conflict with the Hungarian nobility arose when Hungarian refugees were refused to return to their rightful properties in Bačka, which Nenad saw as his. With his forces he continued to pillage Hungarian estates and villages and terrorized the Hungarian population. This turned against him not just the Hungarian nobility but the villagers and peasants as well.

He named Radoslav Čelnik the general commander of his army, while his emissaries to foreign rulers were Fabijan Literat, a Franciscan from Ilok, and Ivan Dolić, the castellan of Bač from Irig. His treasurer and palatine was Subota Vrlić from Jagodina. Besides his main army, he also organized a personal guard numbering 600 soldiers who served at his quasi-court in Subotica. His army grew by drawing Serbs from Ottoman territory, Vlachs from Banat and Transylvania, and also some Roman Catholics; by the beginning of 1527, it numbered around 15,000 men. It is believed that the cooperation of Orthodox and Catholic Slavs was the key of his later success. At that time, there were considerable numbers of Serbs living in the southern Pannonian Plain, most notably in the Danube and Tisa regions (a region commonly known as "Rascia").

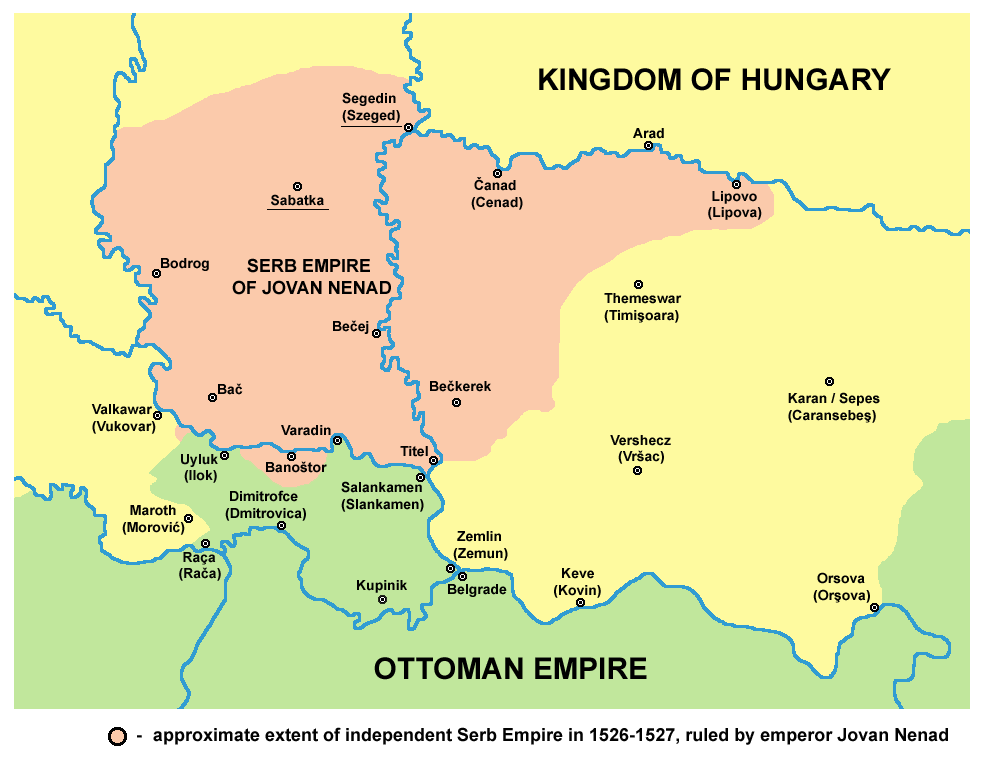
Territorial extent of 'Black Serbia'.

Jovan Nenad considered the struggle around the Hungarian throne just a temporary occupation, his primary task being the fight against the Ottomans for the liberation of the Serb lands. In the first half of 1527, Ferdinand was outside of Hungary, preparing for what would become the Hungarian campaign of 1527–28 to fight Zápolya. During that time, King Zápolya sent armies after Jovan Nenad, wishing to settle his internal affairs before Ferdinand could return to Hungary. Underestimating Nenad's strength, Zápolya sent 300 knights under László Csáky, which were defeated by Jovan Nenad in early April; Csáky himself was captured and executed. After this, Jovan Nenad rose to the peak of his power, and he styled himself emperor. Another Hungarian army was dispatched, led by the Voivode of Transylvania, Péter Perényi. It was defeated by late April near Tiszaszőlős (Battle of Szőlős) on the banks of the Tisza River. Finally, a second army, which encompassed the entire strength of Transylvania and upper Hungary, led by Perényi and Bishop Czibak decisively defeated Jovan's army in the Battle of Sződfalva, killing around 8,000 of his men.

In an attempt to unite with the forces of Ferdinand, Jovan Nenad was severely wounded in Szeged. In his retreat towards Senta, he was intercepted and murdered in the village of Tornjoš. His head was delivered to Zápolya. Soon after his death, the remainder of his army dispersed. Afterward, Radoslav Čelnik led the remains of the army to Ottoman Syrmia, where he ruled until 1530 as an Ottoman vassal, and then as a Habsburg subject.

== Legacy ==
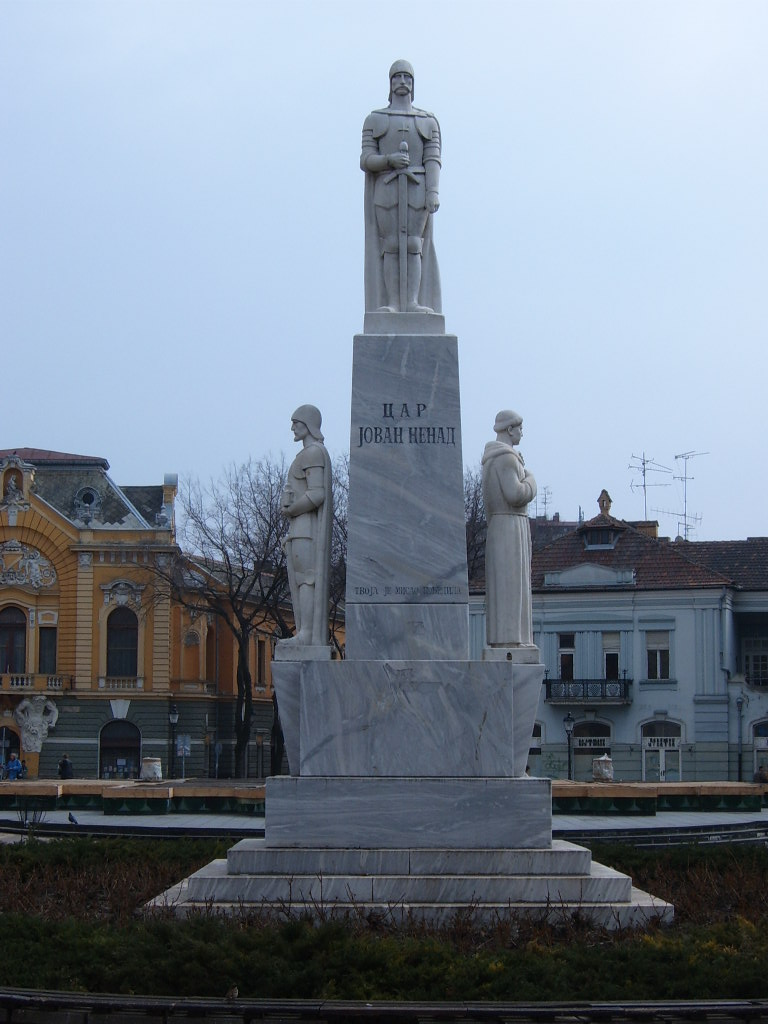
Jovan Nenad monument in Subotica.

As time passed, Jovan Nenad became a mythical figure to the Serbs. Many Serbian historians consider him the founder of contemporary Vojvodina, although in reality his insurrection was too short-lived and his reign too tumultuous to have a lasting impact. Subotica, the province's second largest city (which was once his capital) erected a monument to him bearing the inscription "Your thought has prevailed" (Твоја је мисаo победила/Tvoja je misao pobedila).

== In popular culture ==
In the 1942 Hollywood film Cat People, a small statue of Jovan Nenad (albeit referenced as "King John of Serbia"), plays a central role in developing the underlying mythological basis of the film's plot. The statue is of Jovan Nenad on horseback holding up an impaled cat on his sword.

== See also ==
- Starina Novak (1530s-1601), hajduk leader
- List of Serbian rulers
- List of rulers of Vojvodina
- Serbs of Vojvodina
- Rascians

== Notes ==
1. His name was Jovan Nenad. He was also called Black Jovan (Serbian: Црни Јован; Hungarian: Cserni Jován), Jovan the Black (Јован Црни, German: Johann der Schwarze), or the Black Man (Црни Човек) or Emperor Jovan (Цар Јован). Đorđe Branković (1645–1711) called him Jovan Črnović (Јован Чpновић).

== Sources ==
- Bataković, Dušan T., ed. (2005). Histoire du peuple serbe [History of the Serbian People] (in French). Lausanne: L’Age d’Homme. ISBN 9782825119587.
- Dejan Djokić (2023). A Concise History of Serbia. Cambridge University Press. ISBN 978-1-107-02838-8.
- Ćirković, Sima (2004). The Serbs. Malden: Blackwell Publishing. ISBN 9781405142915.
- Ćorović, Vladimir (2006). Историја Срба. Дом и школа. ISBN 9788683751303.
- Fodor, Pál; Dávid, Géza, eds. (2000). Ottomans, Hungarians, and Habsburgs in Central Europe: The Military Confines in the Era of Ottoman Conquest. Leiden: Brill. ISBN 90-04-11907-8.
- Gavrilović, Slavko (1993). "Serbs in Hungary, Slavonia and Croatia in struggles against the Turks (15th-18th centuries)". Serbs in European Civilization. Belgrade: Nova, Serbian Academy of Sciences and Arts, Institute for Balkan Studies. pp. 41–54. ISBN 9788675830153.
- Isailović, Neven; Krstić, Aleksandar (2015). "Serbian Language and Cyrillic Script as a Means of Diplomatic Literacy in South Eastern Europe in 15th and 16th Centuries". Literacy Experiences concerning Medieval and Early Modern Transylvania. Cluj-Napoca: George Bariţiu Institute of History. pp. 185–195.
- Jireček, Constantin (1918). Geschichte der Serben. Vol. 2. Gotha: Perthes.
- Stojkovski, Boris (2015). "Between Habsburgs and Ottomans - Jovan Nenad movement in 1526-1527". Балканот: луѓе, војни и мир. Скопје: Институт за национална историја. pp. 73–82.
