= Treaty of Andernach (1292) =

1292 treaty in the Holy Roman Empire

The Treaty of Andernach sealed the support of Siegfried II of Westerburg, archbishop of Cologne, for Adolf, King of the Romans, Count of Nassau, in the upcoming imperial election. It was agreed on 27 April 1292.

Under the terms of the treaty, Adolf agreed to the transfer of imperial castles and estates, the cities of Dortmund and Duisburg, and the Reichsvogtship of Essen to the Archdiocese of Cologne after his election.
