= Wigbold von Holte =

Archbishop of Cologne from 1297 to 1304

- Archbishop of Cologne
- Archdiocese: Cologne
- In office: 1297–1304
- Predecessor: Siegfried II of Westerburg
- Successor: Heinrich II of Virneburg

Personal details
- Died: 26 March 1304 Soest, Germany
- Buried: Soest

Wigbold von Holte (died 26 March 1304) was Archbishop of Cologne from 1297 to 1304.

== Election ==
After the death of Archbishop Siegfried II von Westerburg in Bonn on 7 April 1297 the nobility and clergy gathered to select a new archbishop of Cologne in Neuss, as Cologne was still under an interdict. King Adolf of Nassau was also present. Count Eberhard von der Mark urged the election of Wigbold, because Eberhard's son, Engelbert, was married to Wigbold's niece, Mechtilde von Aremberg. When he was duly elected as archbishop of Cologne in May 1297 by the chapter of Cologne Cathedral, of which he was already a member as dean, he was already described as an old man ("senis confracti"). Adolf of Nassau however valued his diplomatic skill, and therefore supported his election.

In 1298 Wigbold received the pallium from Pope Boniface VIII.

== Career as archbishop ==
Well-schooled in worldly and intellectual studies, Wigbold was mostly occupied in minimising the political damage resulting from the defeat at the Battle of Worringen of his predecessor by the Counts of the Mark. He had the reputation of loving money above all else, and was suspected of simony.

He died on 26 March 1304 in Soest, where he is buried.

== Family ==
Wigbold's sister Beatrix von Holte was abbess of Essen Abbey.

== Sources and external links ==
- Hermann Keussen (1897). "Wigbold von Holte" . Allgemeine Deutsche Biographie (in German). Vol. 42. Leipzig: Duncker & Humblot. pp. 459–460.

Wigbold of Holte Born: unknown Died: 26 March 1304 in Soest
Catholic Church titles
Regnal titles
Preceded by Siegfried II of Westerburg	Archbishop-Elector of Cologne and Duke of Westphalia and Angria; 1297–1304	Succeeded by Henry II of Virneburg
