= Siegfried II of Westerburg =

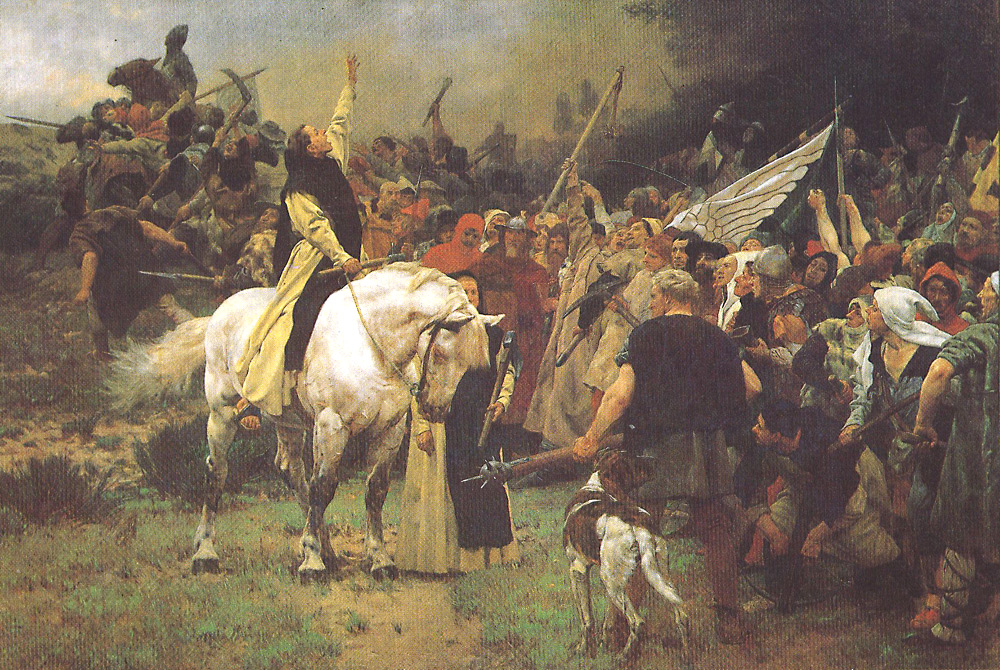

Siegfried (or Sigfrid) II of Westerburg (before 1260 – 7 April 1297, in Bonn) was Archbishop of Cologne from 1275 to 1297.

Siegfried was the second son of Siegfried IV, Count of Runkel in Westerburg (died 1266). His older brother was Henry (Heinrich) I of Westerburg (who would be killed at the Battle of Worringen in 1288).

Siegfried was consecrated Archbishop of Cologne in March 1275 in Lyon. The city of Cologne since 1268 had been under excommunication, and was therefore deemed an unsuitable place for consecration. In July 1275, as the new Archbishop of Cologne, Siegfried lifted the city's excommunication and signed a friendship treaty with the city. In October 1279 in Pingsheim (now part of Nörvenich), he concluded the Peace of Pingsheim with the Counts of Jülich. On 27 April 1285 he awarded Brühl, situated south of Cologne, town and market rights.

Around 1283, Siegfried took the side of Count Reinoud I of Guelders in the War of the Limburg Succession. In March 1287, he led the opposition the taxation of the clergy proposed by the cardinal legate Giovanni Boccamazza at the Synod of Würzburg. In July 1287, he freed the city of Cologne, after receiving a loyalty oath from its citizens, from paying duties to finance his war expenses in the Limburg succession conflict.

His involvement in the Limburg succession dispute led to the Battle of Worringen on 5 June 1288. Siegfried lost the battle, which also involved citizens from Cologne led by Gerhard Overstolzen and from Berg under the leadership of Walter Dodds. Siegfried was taken prisoner by Duke John I of Brabant and delivered over to Count Adolf VIII of Berg. After first spending a night confined in the Schelmenturm at Monheim, he was subsequently brought to Schloss Burg.

Siegfried was released on 6 July 1289 but had fallen ill during the time of his difficult captivity. He earlier had to conclude peace treaties with the victors of Worringen on 19 May 1289. He had to pay reparations of 12,000 marks (about three tons of silver) to the Count of Berg, cede areas (among others, Lünen with all episcopal rights, Westhofen, Brackel, Werl, Menden, Isenberg, and Raffenberg) and the (sub-) Vogtship over the Diocese of Essen to Eberhard II, Count of the Mark (who thereby benefited most from the victory at Worringen), pledge the town of Deutz and some castles, and tear down other castles like Worringen, Zons, and Volmarstein. The Duchy of Limburg was occupied Duke John I of Brabant.

As a consequence of his defeat, on 18 June 1288 he had to recognize in a contract 'the sovereignty of the city' of Cologne. However, on 18 January 1290, Pope Nicholas IV relieved him of all the promises which he had given to Cologne. On 31 January the Pope even called for the Archbishops of Mainz and Trier to help Siegfried recover the Cologne Archbishopric's possessions.

After his release, the Elector preferred to make his residence in Bonn. The archbishop's mint in Cologne ceased operations and Siegfried made Bonn his new mint city. As a challenge to Cologne, he chose the name "Verona" for Bonn, and issued his coins with the inscription "Beata Verona Vince" ("You, Happy Verona will win"). In 1286 Siegfrid introduced the first town constitution in Bonn. It specified that the distinguished citizens (oppidani maiores) should choose twelve suitable men, the best the city had to offer, whose decisions would be binding for the whole citizenry.

In the upcoming election of the King of Germany in 1292, Siegfried favored Count Adolf of Nassau, his brother-in-law, to enable the Archbishop to recover from his vast concessions. In the Treaty of Andernach on 27 April 1292, Adolf of Nassau agreed to all of Siegfried's demands, including the transfer to the Archbishopric of imperial cities like Dortmund and Duisburg, imperial castles and estates, and the Vogtship of Essen. On 5 May 1292, Siegfried saw to the successful election of Adolf of Nassau, and crowned him on 24 June 1292 in Aachen.

Siegfrieds restoration policy, however, was doomed to fail, because of the opposition of the "Coalition of Worringen." He could neither restore the link between his Rhenish and Westphalian possessions, nor re-integrate the city of Cologne into the Diocese. Because of the non-fulfillment of the requirements of the Treaty of Andernach, the kingdom of Adolf of Nassau then collapsed as well.

Siegfried died on 7 April 1297 in Bonn and was buried in the Bonn Minster.

Siegfried of Westerburg Born: unknown Died: 7 April 1297 in Bonn
Catholic Church titles
Regnal titles
Preceded by Engelbert II of Falkenburg	Archbishop-Elector of Cologne and Duke of Westphalia and Angria as Siegfried II; 1275-1297	Succeeded by Wigbold of Holte
