= Heinrich II of Virneburg =

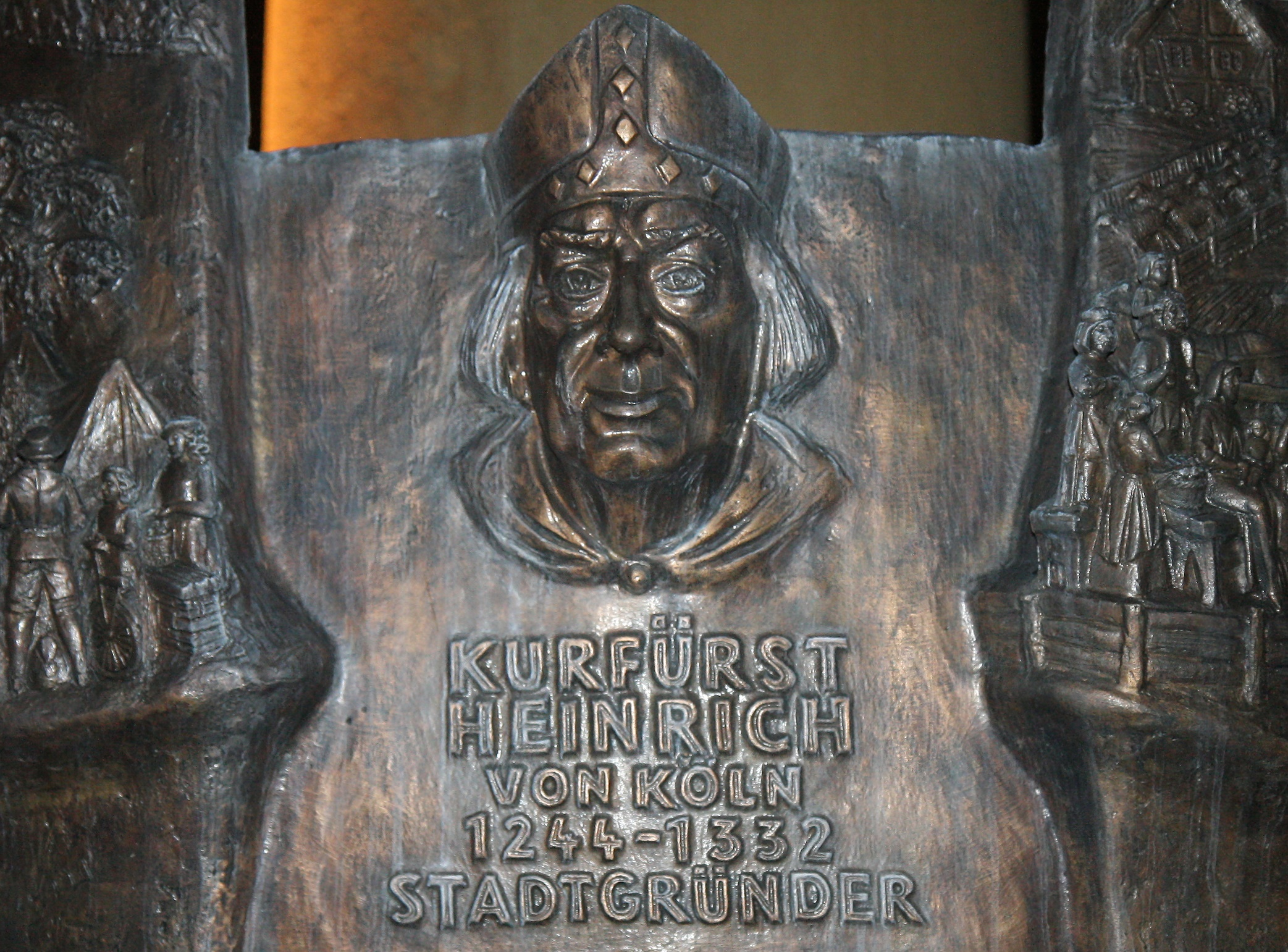
Water well in Olpe, Germany

Count Heinrich II of Virneburg (German: Graf Heinrich II. von Virneburg; 1244 or 1246 – 5 January 1332) was Archbishop of Cologne from 1304 to his death in 1332.

== Life ==
Heinrich was the sixth son of Count Heinrich of Virneburg (died 1290) and his wife Ponzetta of Oberstein (died 1311). In 1288, together with his father and his brother Ruprecht, he took part in the Battle of Worringen on the side of John I, Duke of Brabant.

From 1288 he held two prebends and was a canon of St. Gereon's in Cologne, and in 1292 became chaplain of the German king Adolf of Nassau, to whom he was related. In the following years he became the occupant of a number of canonries. He was not only cathedral provost of Cologne Cathedral, but also archdeacon of both Trier and Cologne. In 1300 he was elected Archbishop of Trier, but the Pope refused to allow it. Heinrich nevertheless remained as opposition bishop to the Pope's appointee, Diether of Nassau, until 1306.

In 1304 however he was elected Archbishop of Cologne, although Papal ratification was not forthcoming until 1306. In the election of King Henry VII in 1308, Heinrich followed the example of Baldwin of Luxembourg, Elector of Trier, and of Peter of Aspelt, Elector of Mainz, and took substantial payment for his vote.

For his seat of government Heinrich II favoured Bonn, where from 1313 to 1328 he was provost of the collegiate foundation of St. Cassius (Cassius-Stift). He issued over 110 writs and charters from here, declared invalid the renunciation of tolls to which his predecessor had been forced to agree and obtained permission from King Henry VII to set up a new toll in Bonn. However, as the burghers of Bonn courageously supported the archbishop in his feud with the lord of Falkenburg at the battle of Euskirchen, Heinrich II granted them exemption from the Rhine toll for all goods.

Under Heinrich of Virneburg Bonn became the location of a king's coronation for the first time, when on 25 November 1314 he crowned Frederick the Handsome as King of the Germans in Bonn Minster.

Heinrich also advanced the building works on the cathedral in Cologne, where on 27 September 1322 he was able to consecrate the high choir of the new Cologne Cathedral.

He was decisively involved in the heresy proceedings against Meister Eckhart, when the written accusation was formally presented to him in 1325. He transferred the proceedings to the Papal curia in Avignon.

According to contemporaries, Heinrich was a chatterer and too fond of drink. He died on 5 January 1332 in Bonn and was buried in St. Barbara's Chapel in Bonn Minster, next to his sister, the abbess Ponzetta of Dietkirchen. His grave is no longer extant.

== Sources and external links ==
- Meister Eckhart und seine Zeit - Leben - Heinrich von Virneburg (in German)
- Heinrich II. von Virneburg in den Saarländischen Biografien (in German)
- Hermann Cardauns (1910). "Heinrich II. (Erzbischof von Köln)". Allgemeine Deutsche Biographie (in German). Vol. 55. Leipzig: Duncker & Humblot. pp. 146–158.
- Erich Wisplinghoff (1969). "Heinrich II.". Neue Deutsche Biographie (in German). Vol. 8. Berlin: Duncker & Humblot. pp. 364–365.
- Oliver Tekolf. "Heinrich II of Virneburg". Biographisch-Bibliographisches Kirchenlexikon (BBKL) (in German).

Henry of Virneburg Counts of Virneburg Born: 1244 or 1246 Died: 5 January 1332 in Bonn
Catholic Church titles
Regnal titles
Preceded by Wigbold von Holte	Archbishop-Elector of Cologne and Duke of Westphalia and Angria as Henry II; 1304–1332	Succeeded by Walram of Jülich
