= Treaty of Andernach (1474) =

1474 treaty between the Holy Roman Empire and France

The Treaty of Andernach was agreed in December 1474 by the Holy Roman Emperor, Frederick III, several princes of the Empire, and the King of France, Louis XI.
