= Battle of Szőlős =

1527 battle

- Part of the Hungarian campaign of 1527–1528
| Date | May 1, 1527 |
| Location | near Csigérszőllős, Kingdom of Hungary (now Seleuș, Romania) |
| Result | Serbian victory |

Belligerents
| Hungarian Kingdom of House Szapolyai | Serbian Empire of Jovan Nenad |

Commanders and leaders
| Péter Perényi | Jovan Nenad |

Strength
| 10,000 cavalry; 2,000 infantry; Several hundred conscripts | 15,000 (infantry and cavalry) |

Casualties and losses
| 3,000 | Minimal |

The Battle of Szőlős or Battle of Seleš (Hungarian: Szőlősi csata, Serbian: Селешка битка (Seleška bitka)) was fought on May 1, 1527 between the ethnic Serbian Rebels and Hungarian nobility. The commander of the Serb forces was Emperor Jovan Nenad, while the Hungarians were led by Péter Perényi of Transylvania. The Hungarian army suffered a total defeat while Perényi barely escaped alive.

== Background to battle ==
In late 1526. Bálint Török attacked Szabadka (Subotica), the capital of the newly formed province in the wake of the Battle of Mohács, with 67 elite cavalry knights. The Serbs fortified the city and halted the attack. When László Csáky arrived with another 300 Hungarian cavalrymen, the Serbs retaliated with full force. Csáky was defeated and executed.

These events alarmed the Hungarian nobility, and János Szapolyai appointed Péter Perényi as leader of an army set to destroy the new state at its heart. Meanwhile, Jovan Nenad, aware of the Hungarians' intentions, mustered a substantial force and marched to meet his enemy.

== Battle ==
Perényi's army numbered some 2,000 infantry and 10,000 cavalry (Transylvanian Hungarians and Saxons) together with few a thousand conscripts and nobility from the Tisza area. Jovan's army numbered 15,000 infantry and cavalry.

Jovan attacked first, concentrating his force on the Hungarian infantry, and then managed to rout the Transylvanian cavalry. Around 3,000 Hungarians and Saxons fell in battle, while Jovan's army suffered minimal casualties.

== Sources ==
- Military History of Hungary, Editor: Ervin Liptai Zrínyi Military Publisher, Budapest 1985. ISBN 978-963-326-337-2
