= Privilegium Maius =

Medieval forged document; elevated Austria to archduchy

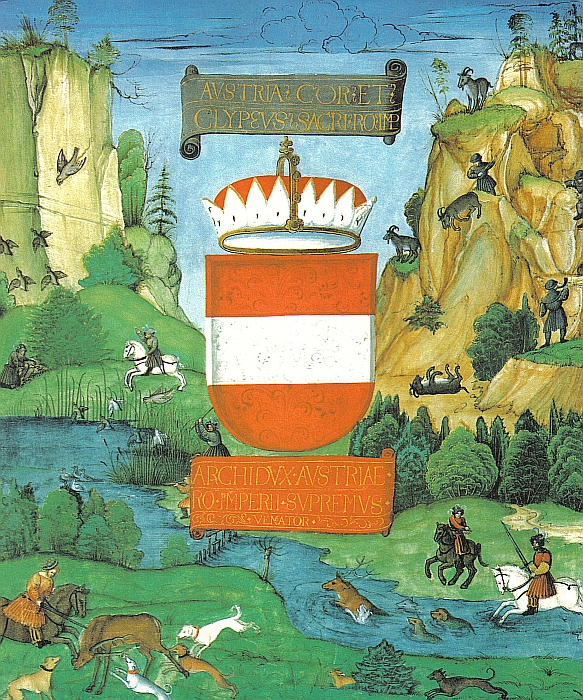
An illustrated cover for the 1512 copy of Privilegium maius, devised for the Emperor Maximilian I

The Privilegium maius (German: Großer Freiheitsbrief 'greater privilege') is a medieval document forged in 1358 or 1359 at the behest of Duke Rudolf IV of Austria (1358–1365) of the House of Habsburg. It was essentially a modified and expanded version of the Privilegium minus issued by Emperor Frederick I Barbarossa in 1156, which had elevated the former March of Austria into the Duchy of Austria. The Privilegium maius claimed various rights and privileges for the Dukes of Austria. It was the main document from a set of five forged charters, that were devised as a response to the Golden Bull of 1356, issued by Emperor Charles IV who did not include the Duke of Austria among the seven prince-electors of the Holy Roman Empire. In order to strengthen various Habsburg claims and aspirations, a set of five documents was produced, main among them being the Privilegium maius that was elevating the Dukes of Austria among the Palatine Archdukes, a newly coined term used only once in the document, as an honorary designation, ranking with prince-electors. That formulation thus became the very basis for the title Archduke of Austria, and the consequent elevation of the Duchy of Austria to the Archduchy of Austria. Emperor Charles IV refused to accept and approve claims from the document, and only in 1453 the Privilegium maius was finally confirmed and enacted by Emperor Frederick III, himself a Habsburg.

The rights and privileges contained within that document, and also within other four forgeries from the same set, had great influence on the Austrian political landscape, particularly after the 1453 confirmation, and thus created a unique connection between Austria and the ruling House of Habsburg, and the same connection was later continued by the succeeding House of Habsburg-Lorraine.

== Background ==
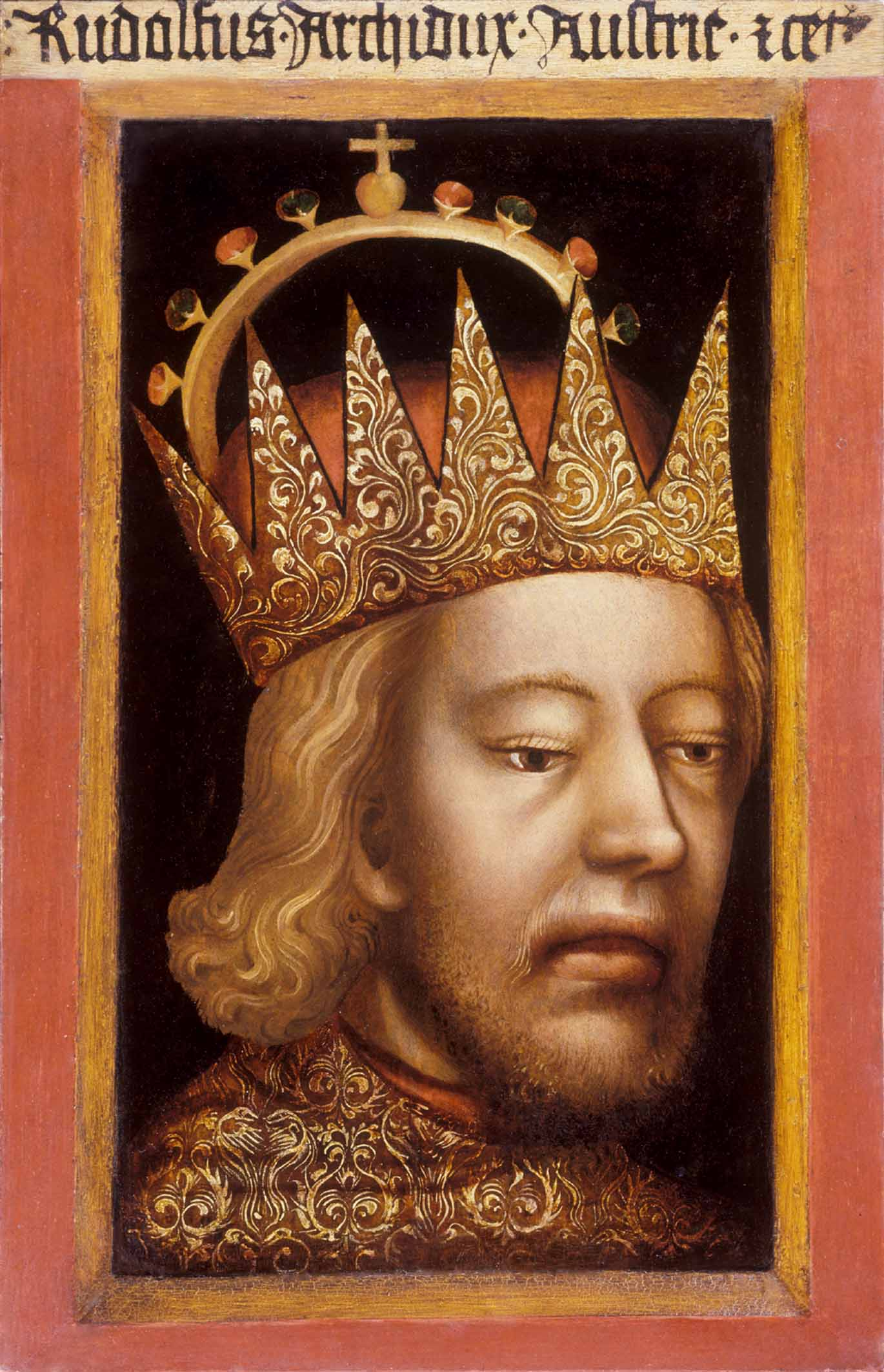
Rudolf IV – Rudolfus Archidux Austriae – with archducal hat, painted about 1365

The House of Habsburg had gained rulership of the Duchy of Austria in 1282. Rudolf IV attempted to restore the Habsburg influence on the European political scene by trying to build relations with Holy Roman Emperor Charles IV and increasing the respect of the Austrian rulers. However, Rudolf IV did not belong to the seven Prince-electors, who—as dictated by the Golden Bull of 1356—had the power to choose the king. In the same way Charles IV had made Prague the center of his rule, Rudolf did the same for Vienna, giving it special privileges, launching construction projects and founding the University of Vienna. All this aimed at increasing the legitimacy and influence of the House and its Austrian lands. For this purpose, in the winter of 1358/1359, Rudolf IV ordered the creation of a forged document called Privilegium maius ("the greater privilege").

== Document ==
The Privilegium maius consists of five forged deeds, some of which purported to have been issued by Julius Caesar and Nero to the historic Roman province of Noricum, which was roughly coterminous with the modern Austrian borders. Though purposefully modeled on the Privilegium minus, the original of which "got lost" at the same time, the bundle was already identified as a fake by contemporaries such as the Italian scholar Petrarch.

In the Privilegium maius, Rudolf IV claimed for the Dukes of Austria various honors, rights and privileges, similar to those of the prince-electors of the Holy Roman Empire such as:

- inseparability of the territory
- automatic inheritance of the first-born (primogeniture), later extended to female heirs in the Pragmatic Sanction of 1713 in favour of Archduchess Maria Theresa
- independent jurisdiction and legislature, without any possibility to appeal to the Emperor (privilegium de non evocando)
- permission to display certain symbols of rule

The Privilegium maius also contained a singular mention of the newly created title of Archdukes Palatine (Latin: Palatinus Archidux; German: Pfalzerzherzog / Palatine Archduke), used as an honorary designation, ranking with prince-electors, among whom the Duke of Austria aspired to be elevated:

"Si quibusvis curiis publicis Imperii dux Austrie presens fuerit unus de palatinis archiducibus est censendus et nichilominus in consessu et incessu ad latus dextrum Imperii post electores principes obtineat primum locum." Also in English: If the Duke of Austria is present at any public courts of the Empire, he is to be considered one of the Palatine Archdukes, and nevertheless in the sitting and procession he shall occupy the first place on the right side of the Empire after the prince electors.

The first Habsburg ruler who actually used the title of an archduke was Ernest of Iron, ruler of Inner Austria from 1406 to 1424. From the 15th century onward, all princes of the Habsburg dynasty were styled as Archdukes (German: Erzherzöge).

=== Related documents from the same set ===
Being the main document from the set of five forged charters, the Privilegium maius was accompanied by four other newly produced forgeries, all created in the same time, during the second half of 1358 or the first half of 1359:

- Charter from "1058", attributed to king Henry IV, and shaped as a confirmation of various privileges whose establishment was attributed to Julius Caesar and emperor Nero, while also granting those rights to margrave Ernst of Austria and awarding him and his successors the lordship over the bishoprics of Salzburg and Lorch (Passau), and allowing them to bear the judicial sword and banner of the land.
- Charter from "1228", attributed to king Henry VII, and also shaped as a confirmation of various privileges, while granting additional rights to duke Leopold VI of Austria and Styria.
- Charter from "1245", attributed to emperor Frederick II, and shaped as a confirmation of the Privilegium maius from "1156", while also granting additional rights to duke Frederick II of Austria.
- Charter from "1283", attributed to king Rudolf I and the Prince-Electors, also shaped as a confirmation of previously issued privileges, awarded now to king's sons Albrecht and Rudolf, dukes of Austria and Styria.

== Effects ==
Emperor Charles IV refused to confirm the Privilegium maius, although he accepted some claims. The discoverer of the forgery was his advisor, the poet and scholar Petrarch. However, Frederick III, of the House of Habsburg, who became Holy Roman Emperor, 1452, confirmed the document and made it part of imperial law, thus making fiction into fact. From then on, the status as claimed by the document became widely accepted. Frederick also extended the Privilegium maius by granting the power of ennoblement for his family as hereditary rulers of Austria (this power was normally reserved for the emperor). Thus, the act of confirmation by Frederick was what elevated the House of Habsburg to a special rank within the Empire. (Note: "Hatte sein Vater durch Anerkennung des Privilegium maius dem Haus einen besonderen Rang im Reich verschafft, so steigerte Maximilian das Ansehen und den Anspruch der Dynastie durch genealogische Spekulationen [...]")

The Privilegium maius had great influence on the Austrian political landscape. In time, the Austrian archdukes arrogated an almost king-like position, and demonstrated this to outsiders through the usage of special insignia. The Habsburgs gained a new foundation for their rule in these lands; in a way, the House of Habsburg and Austria became a single unit. The family subsequently published special editions of the documents, and forbade all discussion of their authenticity.

With the dissolution of the Holy Roman Empire in 1806, the Privilegium maius finally lost its meaning. In 1852, it was proven a forgery by historian Wilhelm Wattenbach.

== Sources ==
- Appelt, Heinrich (1977). "Die Bedeutung des Titels archidux palatinus Austriae". Festschrift Friedrich Hausmann. Graz: Akademische Druck- und Verlagsanstalt. pp. 15–20.
- Bérenger, Jean (2013) [1994]. A History of the Habsburg Empire 1273-1700. London and New York: Routledge.
- Lhotsky, Alphons (1957). Privilegium maius: Die Geschichte einer Urkunde. Wien: Verlag für Geschichte und Politik.
- Sauter, Alexander (2003). Fürstliche Herrschaftsrepräsentation: Die Habsburger im 14. Jahrhundert. Ostfildern: Jan Thorbecke Verlag.
- Wilson, Peter H. (2016). Heart of Europe: A History of the Holy Roman Empire. Cambridge: Harvard University Press.
