= Archduke =

Title used by the Habsburg dynasty

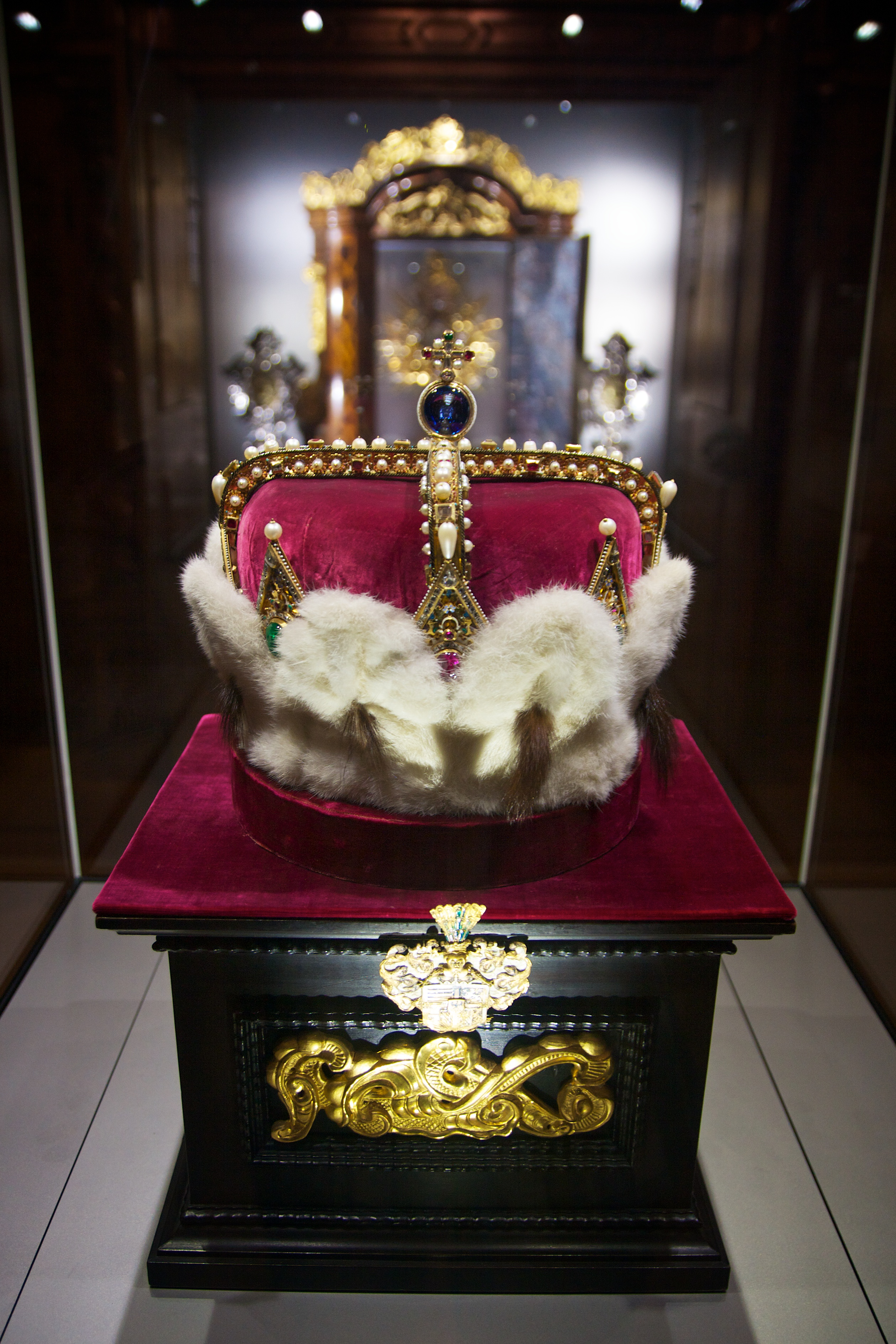
Archducal hat, the coronet of the Archduchy of Austria kept in the treasury of Klosterneuburg Abbey

Archduke (Latin: Archidux; German: Erzherzog), or in feminine form Archduchess (Latin: Archiducissa; German: Erzherzogin) was a title of nobility in the Holy Roman Empire, and later in the Austrian Empire and the Austro-Hungarian Monarchy. It denoted a rank above the duke, but below the king or emperor, and was roughly equal to that of a grand duke. The title was initially devised by Rudolf IV, Duke of Austria (d. 1365) from the House of Habsburg, who claimed the archducal rank and title since 1358-1359, and the same aspiration was later reaffirmed by Ernest, Duke of Austria (d. 1424), but both failed to secure imperial confirmation of their claims. The title was officially established by Emperor Frederick III in 1453, who awarded the archducal title to the Austrian ruling House of Habsburg, thus elevating the Duchy of Austria to the Archduchy of Austria. By further dynastic provisions, the title Archduke of Austria, (in feminine form: Archduchess of Austria), was awarded to all members of the Habsburg dynasty, and the same use of the title was later continued by the House of Habsburg-Lorraine.

== Terminology ==
The English word is first recorded in 1530, derived from Middle French archeduc, a 15th-century derivation from Medieval Latin archidux, from Latin archi- (Greek ἀρχι-) meaning "authority" or "primary" (see arch-) and dux "duke" (literally "leader").

"Archduke" (German: Erzherzog; Dutch: aartshertog) is a title distinct from "grand duke" (French: grand-duc; Luxembourgish: Groussherzog; German: Großherzog; Dutch: groothertog), a later monarchic title borne by the rulers of other European countries (for instance, Luxembourg).

== History ==
The Latin title archidux is first attested in reference to Bruno the Great, who ruled simultaneously as Archbishop of Cologne and Duke of Lotharingia in the 10th century, in the work of his biographer Ruotger of Cologne. In Ruotger, the title served as an honorific denoting Bruno's unusual position rather than a formal office.

The title was not used systematically until the 14th century, when the title "Archduke of Austria" was invented in the forged Privilegium Maius (1358–1359) by Duke Rudolf IV of Austria, called Rudolf the Founder (German: Rudolf der Stifter). Rudolf originally claimed the title in the form palatinus archidux ("palatine archduke"). The title was intended to emphasize the claimed precedence (thus "Arch-") of the Duchy of Austria, in an effort to put the Habsburgs on an even level with the Prince-Electors of the Holy Roman Empire, as Austria had been passed over when the Golden Bull of 1356 assigned that dignity to the four highest-ranking secular Imperial princes and three Archbishops. Holy Roman Emperor Charles IV refused to recognise the title, as did all the other ruling dynasties of the member countries of the Empire. However, Duke Ernest the Iron also used the archducal title before its imperial confirmation in 1453.

The archducal title was only officially recognized in 1453 by Emperor Frederick III, when the Habsburgs had solidified their grip on the throne of the de jure elected Holy Roman Emperor, making it de facto hereditary. Despite that imperial authorization of the title, which showed a Holy Roman Emperor from the Habsburg dynasty deciding over a title claim of the Habsburg dynasty, many ruling dynasties of the countries which formed the Empire refused to recognize the title "Archduke". Fredericks III´s confirmation did not extend to Ladislaus the Posthumous, Duke of Austria, who died in 1457. Emperor Frederick III himself simply used the title "Duke of Austria", not Archduke, until his death in 1493. The title was first granted to Frederick's younger brother, Albert VI of Austria (d. 1463), who used it at least from 1458.

In 1477, Frederick III also granted the title of Archduke to his first cousin, Sigismund of Austria, ruler of Further Austria (German: Vorderösterreich). Frederick's son and heir, the future Emperor Maximilian I, started to use the title, but apparently only after the death of his wife Mary of Burgundy (d. 1482), as Archduke never appears in documents issued jointly by Maximilian and Mary as rulers in the Low Countries (where Maximilian is still titled "Duke of Austria"). The title appears first in documents issued under the joint rule of Maximilian and his son Philip in the Low Countries.

Archduke was initially borne by those dynasts who ruled a Habsburg territory—i.e., only by males and their consorts, appanages being commonly distributed to cadets. But these "junior" archdukes did not thereby become sovereign hereditary rulers, since all territories remained vested in the Austrian crown. Occasionally a territory might be combined with a separate gubernatorial mandate ruled by an archducal cadet.

== Usage ==
From the 16th century onward, "Archduke" and its female form, "Archduchess", came to be used by all the members of the House of Habsburg (e.g. Queen Marie Antoinette of France was born Archduchess Maria Antonia of Austria). Upon extinction of the male line of the Habsburgs and the marriage of their heiress, the Holy Roman Empress-consort Maria Theresa, Queen of Hungary and Archduchess of Austria, to Francis Stephen, Duke of Lorraine, who was elected Holy Roman Emperor, their descendants formed the House of Habsburg-Lorraine. After the dissolution of the Holy Roman Empire this usage was retained in the Austrian Empire (1804–1867) and the Austro-Hungarian Empire (1867–1918).

The official use of titles of nobility and of all other hereditary titles, including Archduke, has been illegal in the Republic of Austria for Austrian citizens since the Law on the Abolition of Nobility (Gesetz vom 3. April 1919 über die Aufhebung des Adels, der weltlichen Ritter- und Damenorden und gewisser Titel und Würden). Thus those members of the Habsburg family who are residents of the Republic of Austria are simply known by their first name(s) and their surname Habsburg-Lothringen. However, members of the family who reside in other countries may or may not use the title, in accordance with laws and customs in those nations.

For example, Otto Habsburg-Lothringen (1912–2011), the eldest son of the last Habsburg Emperor, was an Austrian, Hungarian and German citizen. As he lived in Germany, where it is permitted to use hereditary titles as part of the civil surname (including indications of origin, such as von or zu), his official civil name was Otto von Habsburg (literally: Otto of Habsburg), whereas in Austria he was registered as Otto Habsburg.

The Monarchs of Spain also bear the nominal title of Archduke/Archduchess of Austria as part of their full list of titles, as the Bourbon dynasty adopted all the titles previously held by the Spanish Habsburgs when they took over the Spanish throne. However, "Archduke" was never considered by the Spanish Bourbons as a substantial dignity of their own dynasty, but rather as a traditional supplementary title of the Spanish Crown since the days of the Habsburg dynasty on the royal throne (1516–1700). Hence, no member of the royal family other than the Monarch bears the (additional) title of "Archduke".

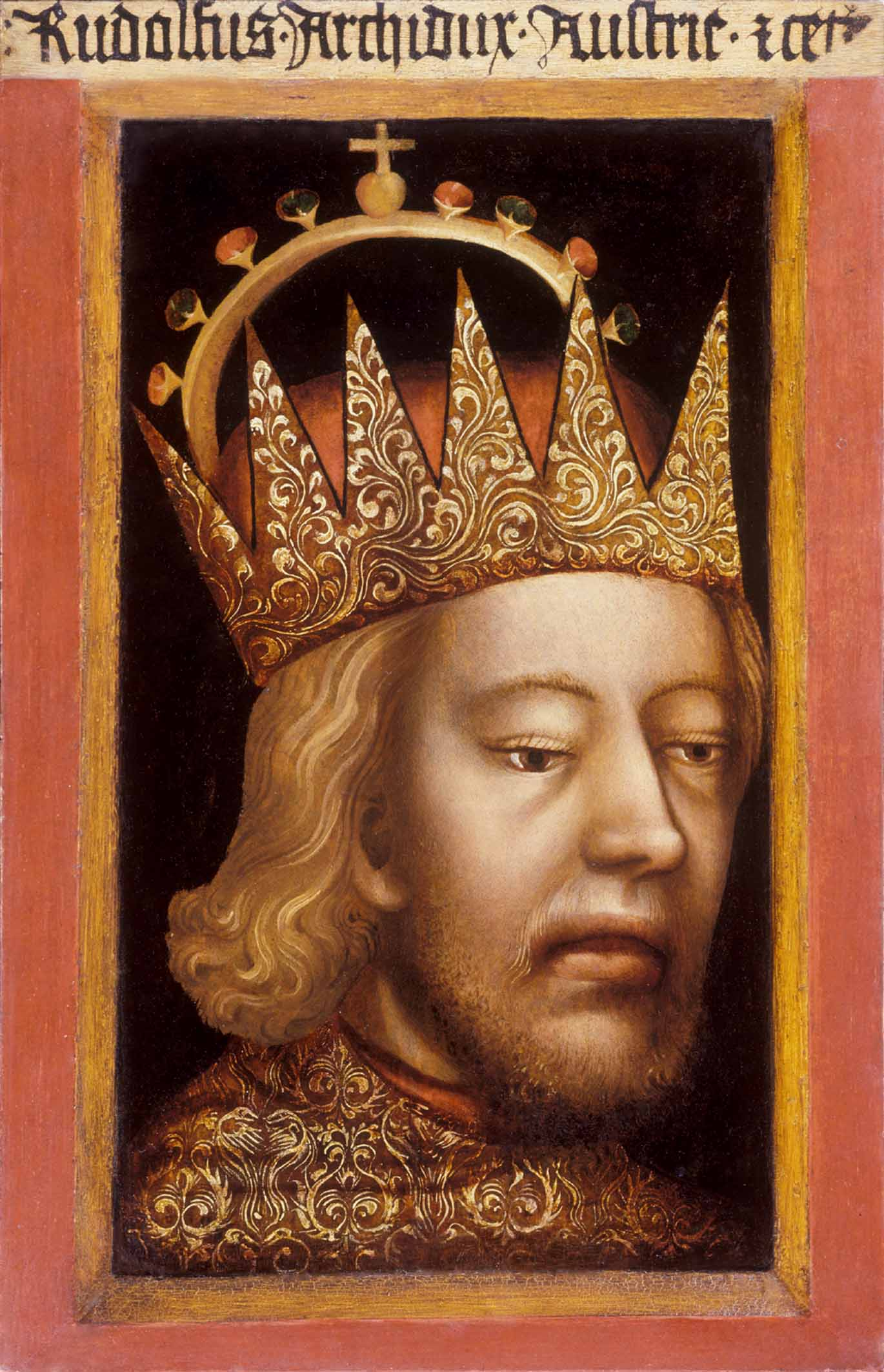
The use of archducal title in depiction of its first claimant, Rudolf IV, Duke of Austria

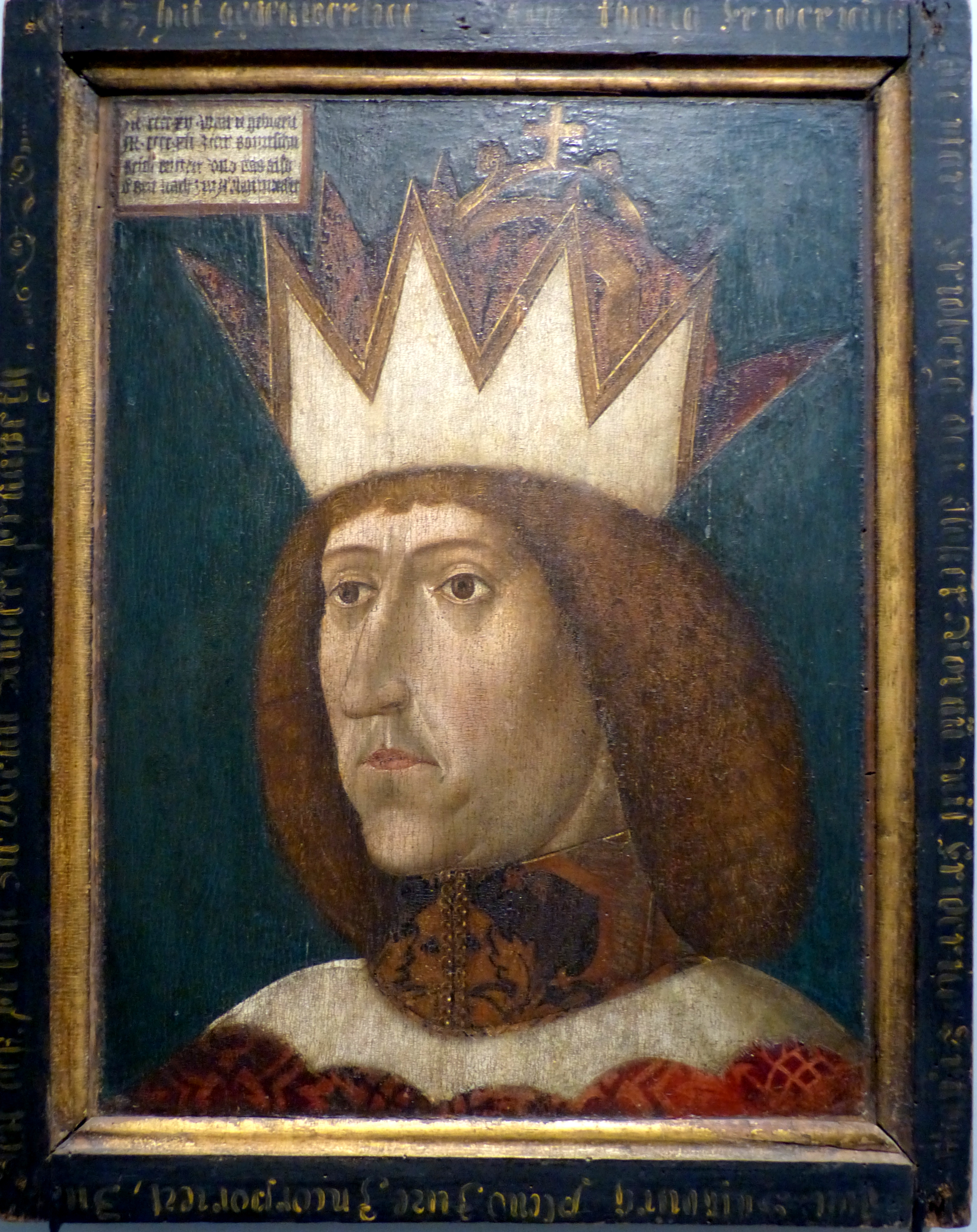
Depiction of the archducal crown in a portrait of Frederick III

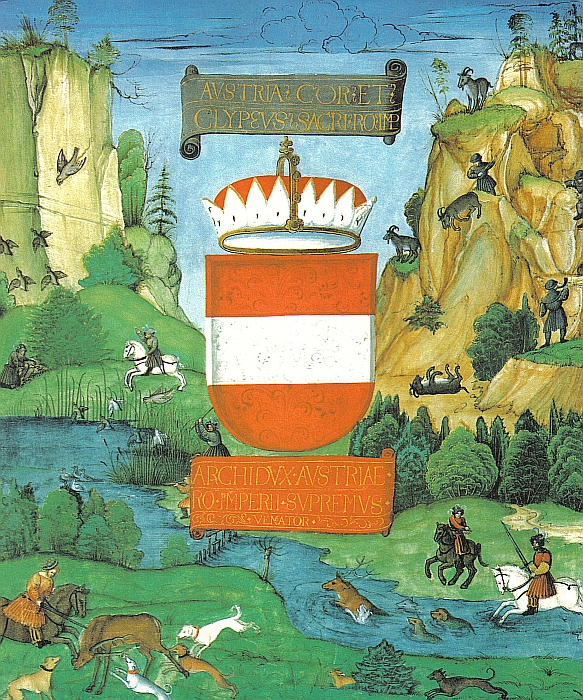
The use of archducal title in an illustrated cover for the 1512 copy of Privilegium maius, devised for the Emperor Maximilian I

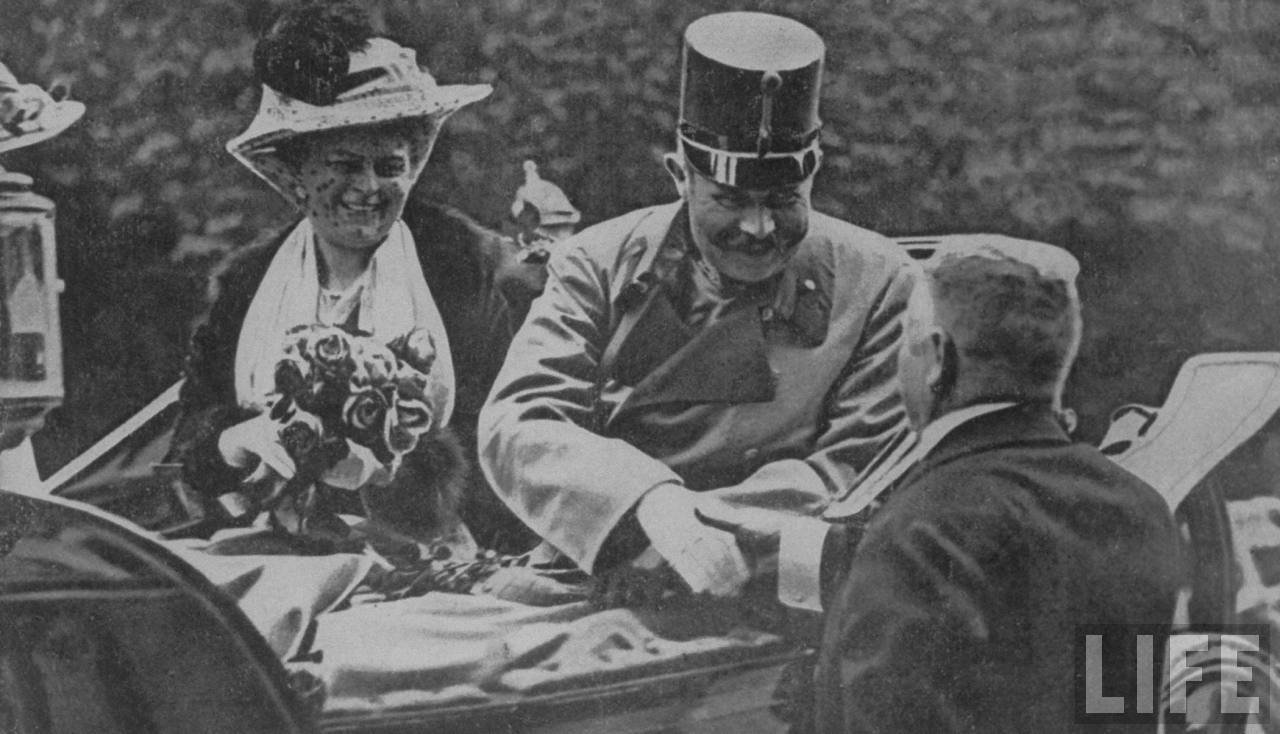
Archduke Franz Ferdinand with his wife, before their assassination in Sarajevo (1914), which sparked World War I

== Insignia ==
The Austrian archducal hat (= the insignia of the Archduke) is preserved in the treasury of Klosterneuberg Abbey, where it has been kept since 1616. It was taken from Vienna for ceremonies of hereditary homage to a new archduke.

== See also ==
- List of rulers of Austria
- List of Austrian consorts

== Sources ==
- Appelt, Heinrich (1977). "Die Bedeutung des Titels archidux palatinus Austriae". Festschrift Friedrich Hausmann. Graz: Akademische Druck- und Verlagsanstalt. pp. 15–20.
- Lhotsky, Alphons (1957). Privilegium maius: Die Geschichte einer Urkunde. Wien: Verlag für Geschichte und Politik.
- Wilson, Peter H. (2016). Heart of Europe: A History of the Holy Roman Empire. Cambridge: Harvard University Press.
