= Archduchy of Austria =

Central European monarchy (1453–1918)

Coordinates: 48°13′N 16°22′E

Archduchy of Austria Archiducatus Austriae (Latin) Erzherzogtum Österreich (German)
- 1453–1804; 1867–1918
- Coat of arms
- Motto: A.E.I.O.U. (Motto for the House of Habsburg) "All The World Is Subject To Austria"
- Full coat of arms with decorations

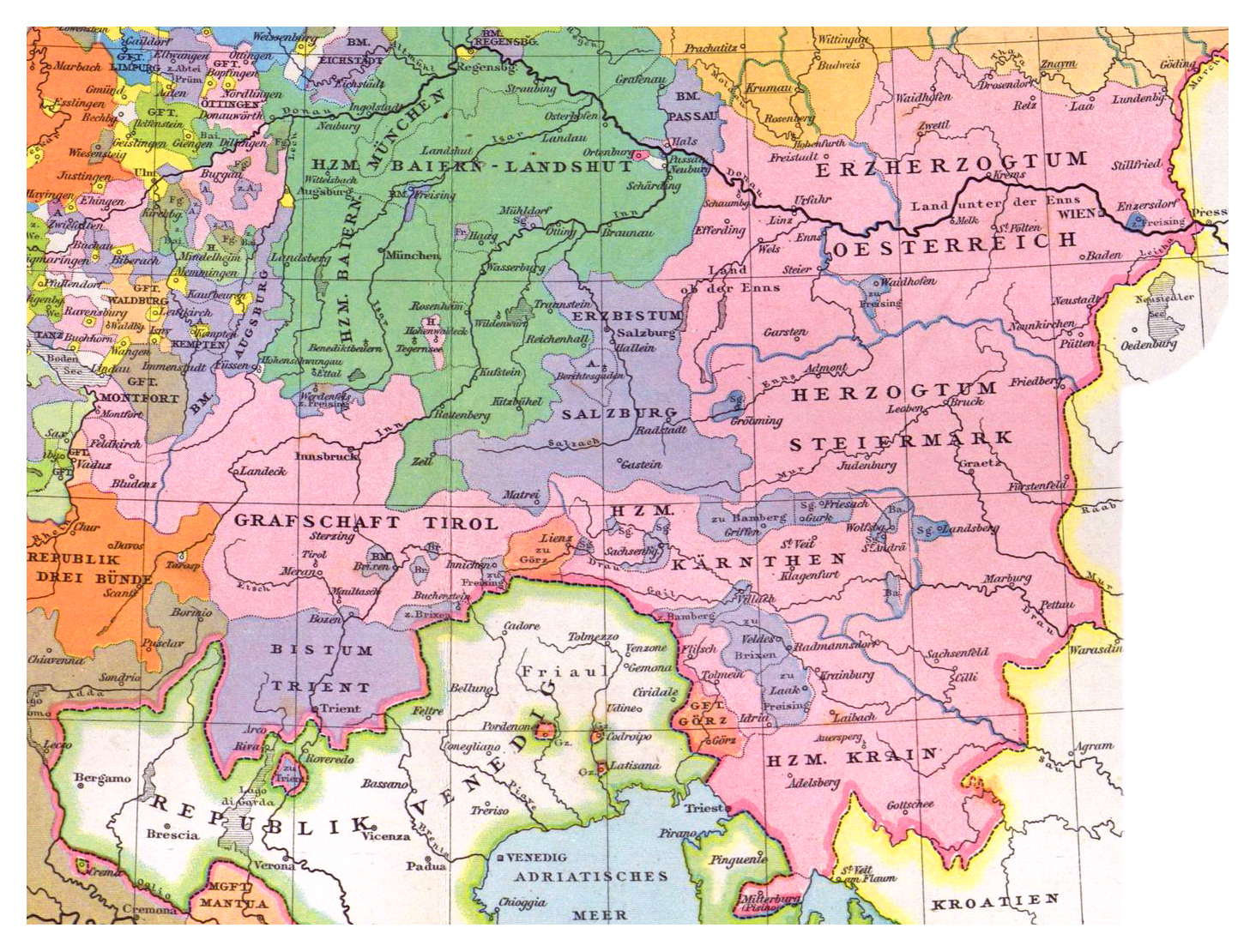
- The Archduchy of Austria, within Habsburg lands in the 15th century
- Status: State of the Holy Roman Empire (1453–1806); Crown land of the Habsburg monarchy (from 1526)
- Capital: Vienna
- Common languages: Central Bavarian; German; Renaissance Latin; Slovene
- Religion: Roman Catholicism
- Demonym: Austrian
- Government: Absolute monarchy
- Archduke
  - 1453–1457: Ladislaus V
  - 1519–1521/1556: Charles V
  - 1521–1564: Ferdinand I
  - 1658–1705: Leopold I
  - 1740–1780: Maria Theresa
  - 1792–1806: Francis I
  - 1867–1916: Franz Joseph I
  - 1916–1918: Charles I
- Historical era: Late Middle Ages to Early modern period
  - Duke Rudolf IV forged Privilegium Maius: 1358/59
  - Emperor Frederick III acknowledged archducal title: 6 January 1453
  - Joined Austrian Circle: 1512
  - Ferdinand I regent according to Worms agreement: 28 April 1521
  - War of the Austrian Succession: 1740–1748
  - Austrian Empire proclaimed: 11 August 1804
  - Holy Roman Empire dissolved: 6 August 1806
  - Austro-Hungarian Compromise: 30 August 1867
  - Monarchy abolished: 18 November 1918
  - Disestablished: 1918
- Currency: Conventionsthaler (Pre-1806); Florin (1867–1892); Crown (1892–1918)
Preceded by	Succeeded by
Duchy of Austria	1804: Austrian Empire; 1918: Republic of German-Austria
- ^a The title "Archduke of Austria" remained part of the official grand title of the rulers of Austria until 1918.

The Archduchy of Austria (Latin: Archiducatus Austriae; German: Erzherzogtum Österreich) was a major principality and later transformed into one of the most important states of the Holy Roman Empire and the nucleus of the Habsburg monarchy. Throughout the Renaissance and early modern era, rulers of the Archduchy of Austria ruled as the Holy Roman Emperors and also ruled as the sole rulers of various states like Hungary, Bohemia, Moravia and many others. It was the center of the Holy Roman Empire and of central Europe and its capital Vienna acted as the de facto capital of the empire and the seat of Holy Roman Emperors. With its capital at Vienna, the archduchy was centered at the Empire's southeastern periphery. From Frederick III to Charles I, the last ruler of the state until 1918, the state was ruled by the Habsburg Dynasty.

Its present name originates from the Frankish term Oustrich – Eastern Kingdom (east of the Frankish kingdom). The archduchy developed out of the Bavarian Margraviate of Austria, elevated to the Duchy of Austria according to the 1156 Privilegium Minus by Emperor Frederick Barbarossa. The House of Habsburg came to the Austrian throne in Vienna in 1282 and in 1453 Emperor Frederick III, also the ruler of Austria, officially adopted the archducal title. From the 15th century onward, all Holy Roman Emperors but one were Austrian archdukes and with the acquisition of the Bohemian and Hungarian crown lands in 1526, the Habsburg hereditary lands became the centre of a major European power.

The archduchy's history as an imperial state ended with the dissolution of the Holy Roman Empire in 1806. It was replaced with the Lower and Upper Austria crown lands of the Austrian Empire.

== Geography ==
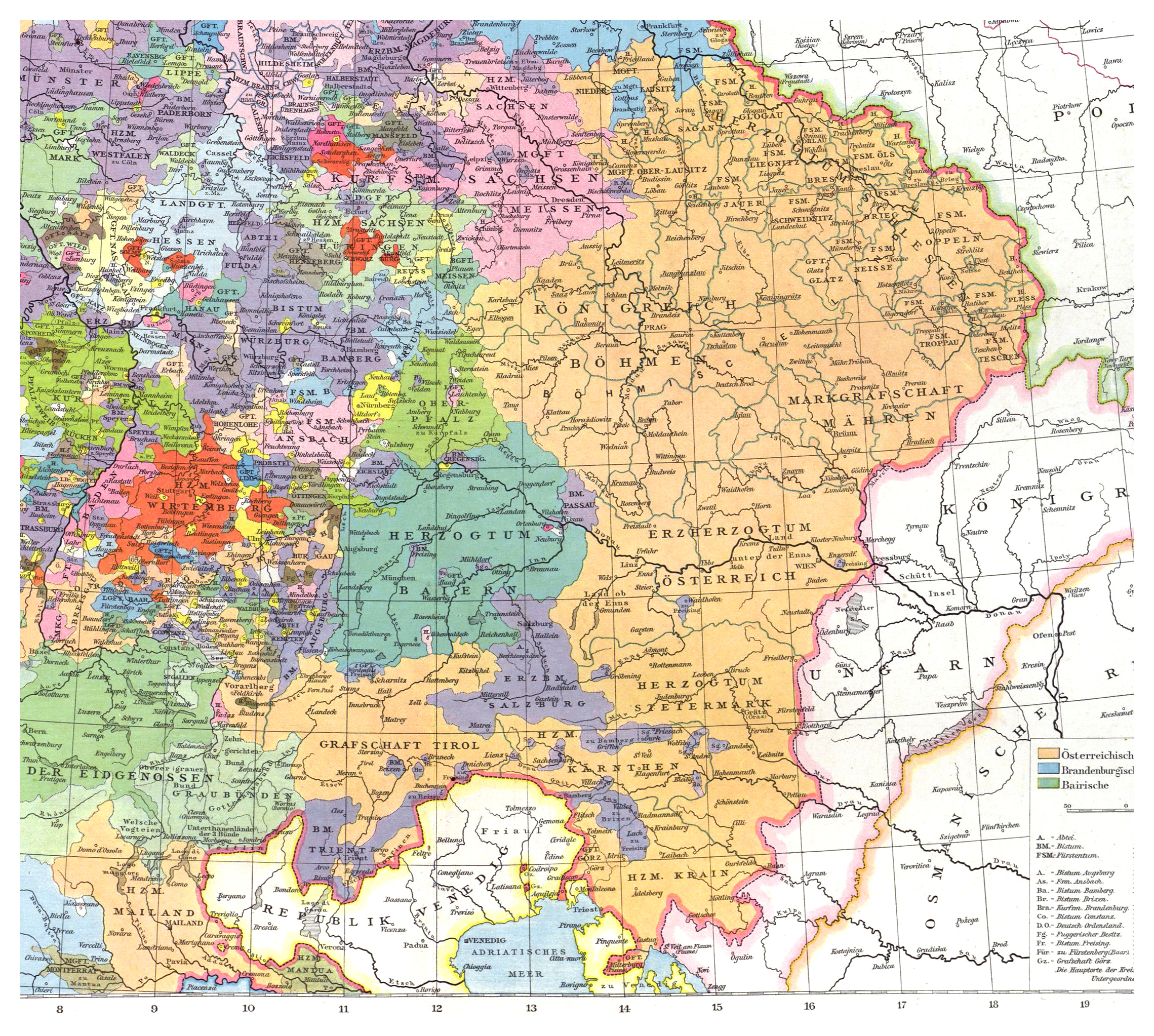
The Archduchy of Austria within Habsburg lands during the 16th century

Located in the Danube basin, Austria bordered on the Kingdom of Hungary beyond the March and Leitha rivers in the east. In the south it was confined by the Duchy of Styria, with the border at the historic Semmering Pass, while in the north the Bohemian Forest and the Thaya river marked the border with Bohemia and Moravia.

In the west, the Upper Austrian part bordered on the Bavarian stem duchy. The adjacent Innviertel region belonged to the Bavarian dukes, until it was occupied by Austrian forces during the War of the Bavarian Succession in 1778 and incorporated into the archducal lands according to the Peace of Teschen. In the course of the German mediatisation in 1803, the Austrian archdukes also acquired the rule over the Electorate of Salzburg and the Berchtesgaden Provostry.

== History ==
After Austria was detached from the Duchy of Bavaria and established as an Imperial estate in 1156 (thanks to the Privilegium Minus), the Babenberg dukes also acquired the neighbouring Duchy of Styria in 1192. After the extinction of male line in 1246 and the subsequent quarter-century reign by King Ottokar II of Bohemia – a permanent vestige of his rule is the division of Austria proper into Upper and Lower Austria (at the time called "Austria above the Enns" and "below the Enns") – it was seized by Habsburg King Rudolf I of Germany, who defeated Ottokar in the Battle on the Marchfeld (1278) and later (1282) enfeoffed his sons Albert I and Rudolf II with both duchies.

In 1358/1359, Austrian Duke Rudolf IV, in response to the Golden Bull of 1356, already claimed the archducal title by forging the Privilegium Maius. Rudolf aimed to achieve a status comparable to the Empire's seven prince-electors, the holders of the traditional Imperial 'arch'-offices; however, his attempts failed as the elevation was rejected by the Luxembourg emperor Charles IV (Rudolf's father-in-law). Rudolf's younger brothers Albert III and Leopold III divided the Habsburg lands by the 1379 Treaty of Neuberg, whereafter the Austrian duchy itself remained under the rule of the Albertinian line.

=== From duchy to archduchy ===
On Epiphany 1453, Emperor Frederick III, regent of the Duchy of Austria for his minor Albertinian cousin Ladislaus the Posthumous, finally acknowledged the archducal title. It was then conferred to all Habsburg emperors and rulers, as well as to the non-ruling princes of the dynasty, however, it still did not carry the right to vote in the Imperial election.

Frederick further promoted the rise of the Habsburg dynasty into European dimensions with the arrangement of the marriage between his son Archduke Maximilian and Mary of Burgundy, heiress of Burgundy in 1477. After Maximilian's son Philip the Handsome in 1496 had married Joanna the Mad, Queen of Castile and Aragon, his son Charles V could come into an inheritance "on which the sun never sets".

Nevertheless, Charles' younger brother Ferdinand I claimed his rights and became Archduke of Austria according to an estate distribution at the 1521 Diet of Worms, whereby he became regent over the Austrian archduchy and the adjacent Inner Austrian lands of Styria, Carinthia, Carniola, and Gorizia (Görz). By marrying Princess Anna of Bohemia and Hungary, Ferdinand inherited both kingdoms in 1526. Also King of the Romans from 1531, he became the progenitor of the Austrian branch of the House of Habsburg (House of Habsburg-Lorraine from 1780 on), which as Archdukes of Austria and Kings of Bohemia ruled as Holy Roman Emperors until the Empire's dissolution in 1806.

=== Austrian Empire ===
In 1804, Emperor Francis II, who was also ruler of the lands of the Habsburg monarchy, established the Austrian Empire in reaction to Napoleon's proclamation of the French Empire. His new state comprised both territories within the Holy Roman Empire (the Erblande, which included the Archduchy, and the Lands of the Bohemian Crown) and outside it (Hungary including Croatia and Transylvania, Galicia and Lodomeria and his recently acquired former Venetian territory). Two years later Francis formally dissolved the Holy Roman Empire. The Archduchy of Austria continued to exist as a constituent crown land (Kronland) within the Empire, although it was divided into Upper and Lower Austria for administrative purposes. (Hungary preserved its earlier status as Regnum Independens.) The title of archduke continued to be used by members of the imperial family and the archduchy was only formally dissolved in 1918 with the collapse of Austria-Hungary and the creation of the separate federal states of Lower and Upper Austria in the new Republic of German-Austria.

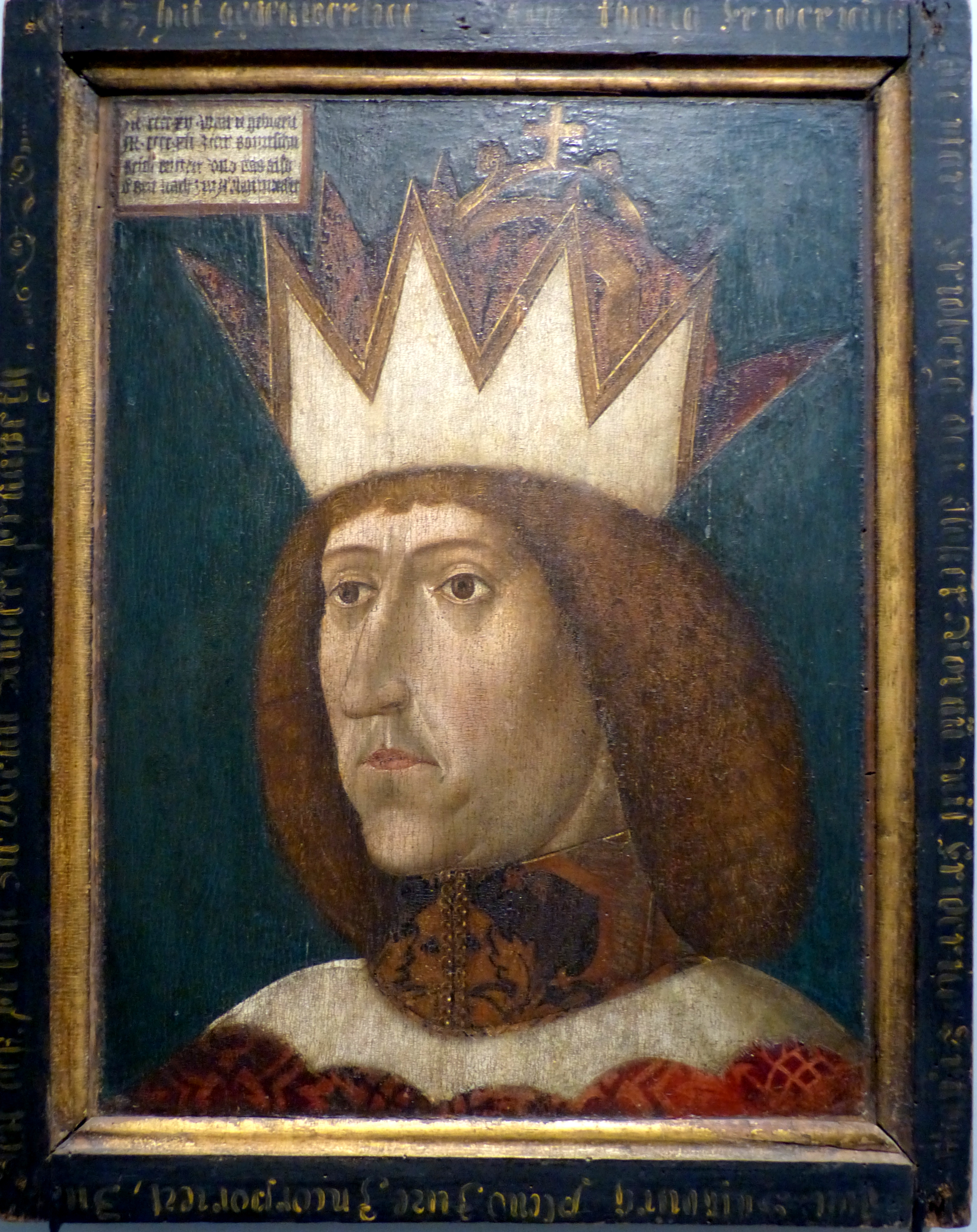
Depiction of the archducal crown in a portrait of Frederick III

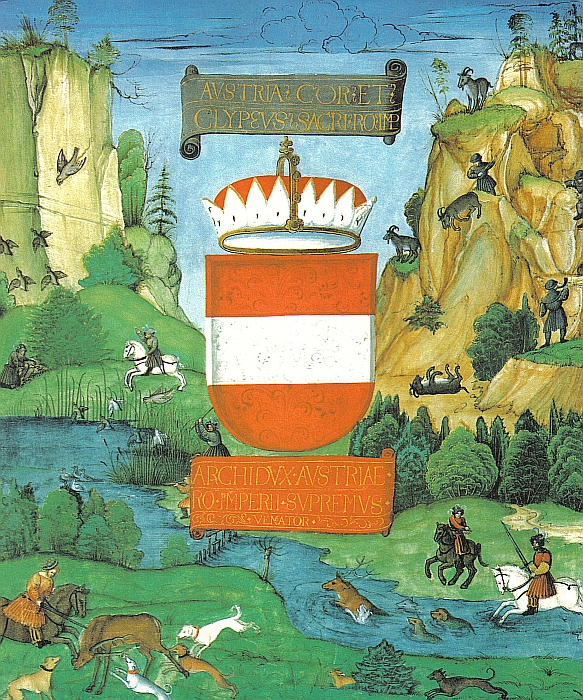
The use of archducal title in an illustrated cover for the 1512 copy of Privilegium maius, devised for the Emperor Maximilian I

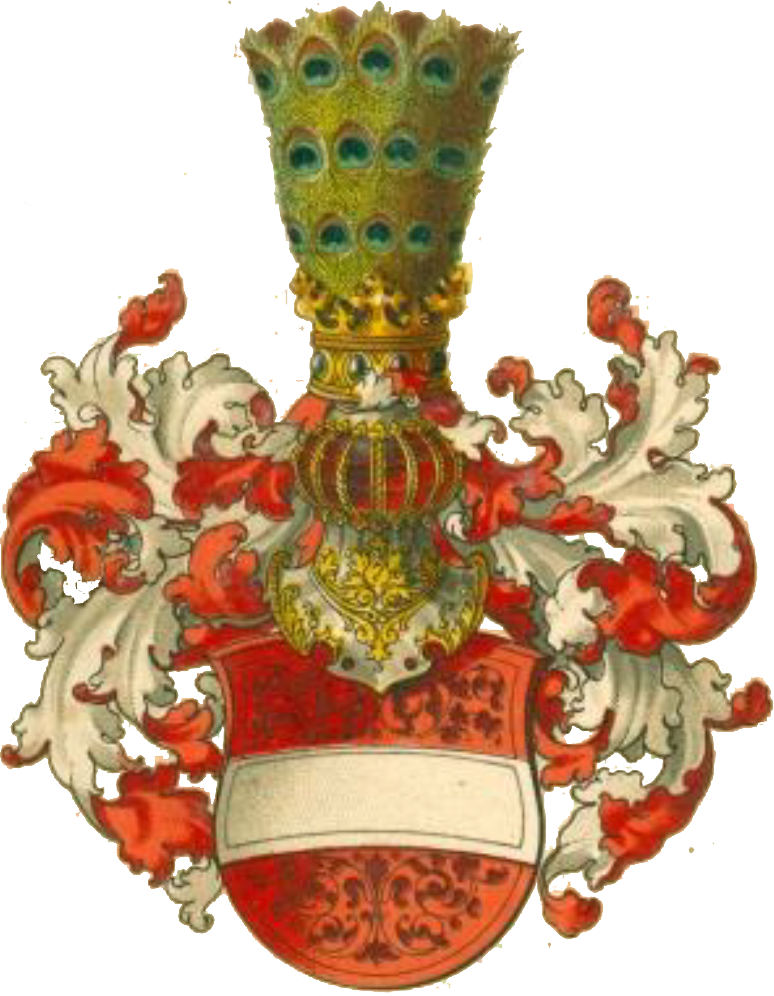
Hugo Gerald Ströhl's depiction in his Wappenrolle Österreich-Ungarns (1890 and 1900)

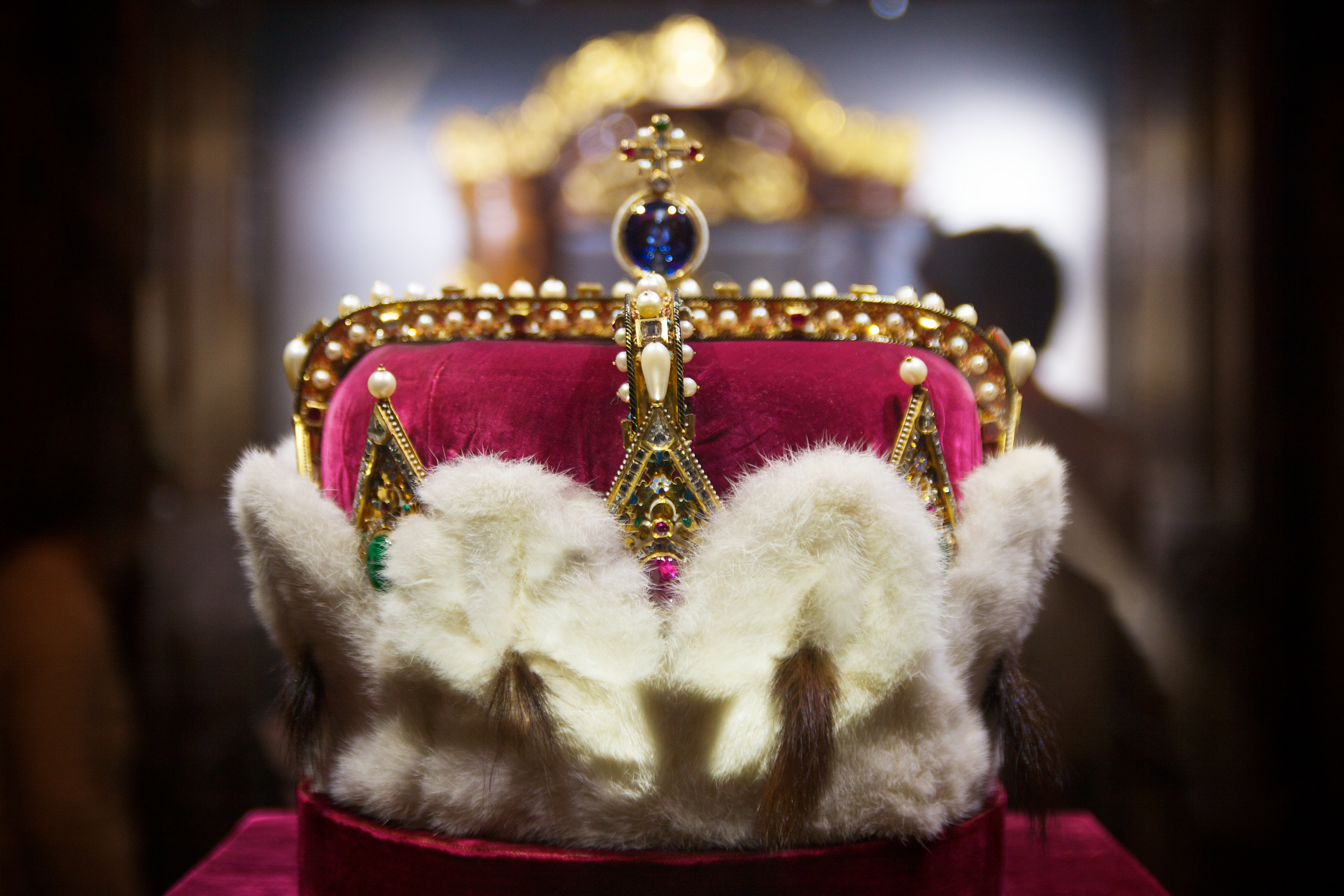
The Austrian Archducal hat

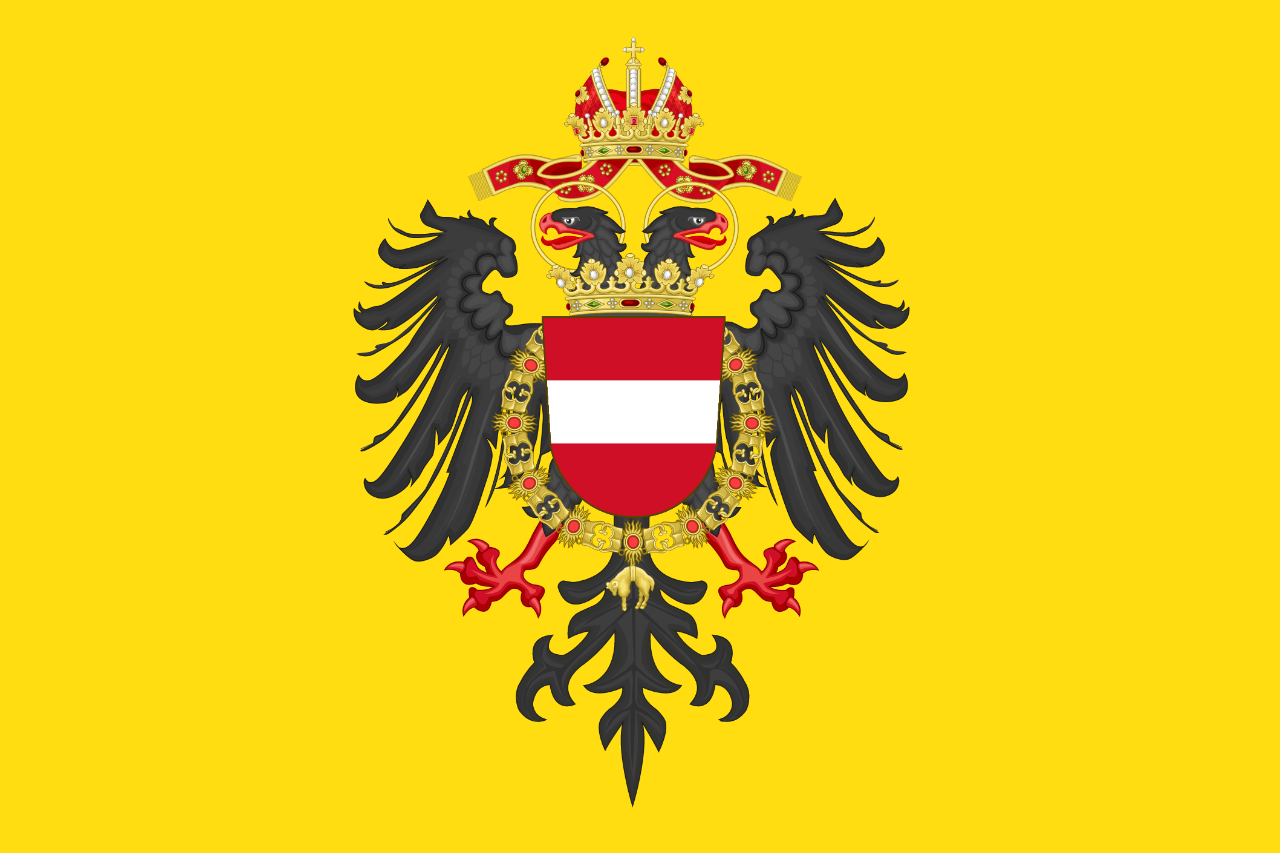
Austrian Ensign (1685–1740)

== See also ==
- History of Austria
- List of rulers of Austria

== Sources ==
- Appelt, Heinrich (1977). "Die Bedeutung des Titels archidux palatinus Austriae". Festschrift Friedrich Hausmann. Graz: Akademische Druck- und Verlagsanstalt. pp. 15–20.
- Bérenger, Jean (2013) [1994]. A History of the Habsburg Empire 1273-1700. London and New York: Routledge.
- Lhotsky, Alphons (1957). Privilegium maius: Die Geschichte einer Urkunde. Wien: Verlag für Geschichte und Politik.
- Sauter, Alexander (2003). Fürstliche Herrschaftsrepräsentation: Die Habsburger im 14. Jahrhundert. Ostfildern: Jan Thorbecke Verlag.
- Wilson, Peter H. (2016). Heart of Europe: A History of the Holy Roman Empire. Cambridge: Harvard University Press.
