= Archducal hat of Joseph II =

Imperial insignia of Joseph II

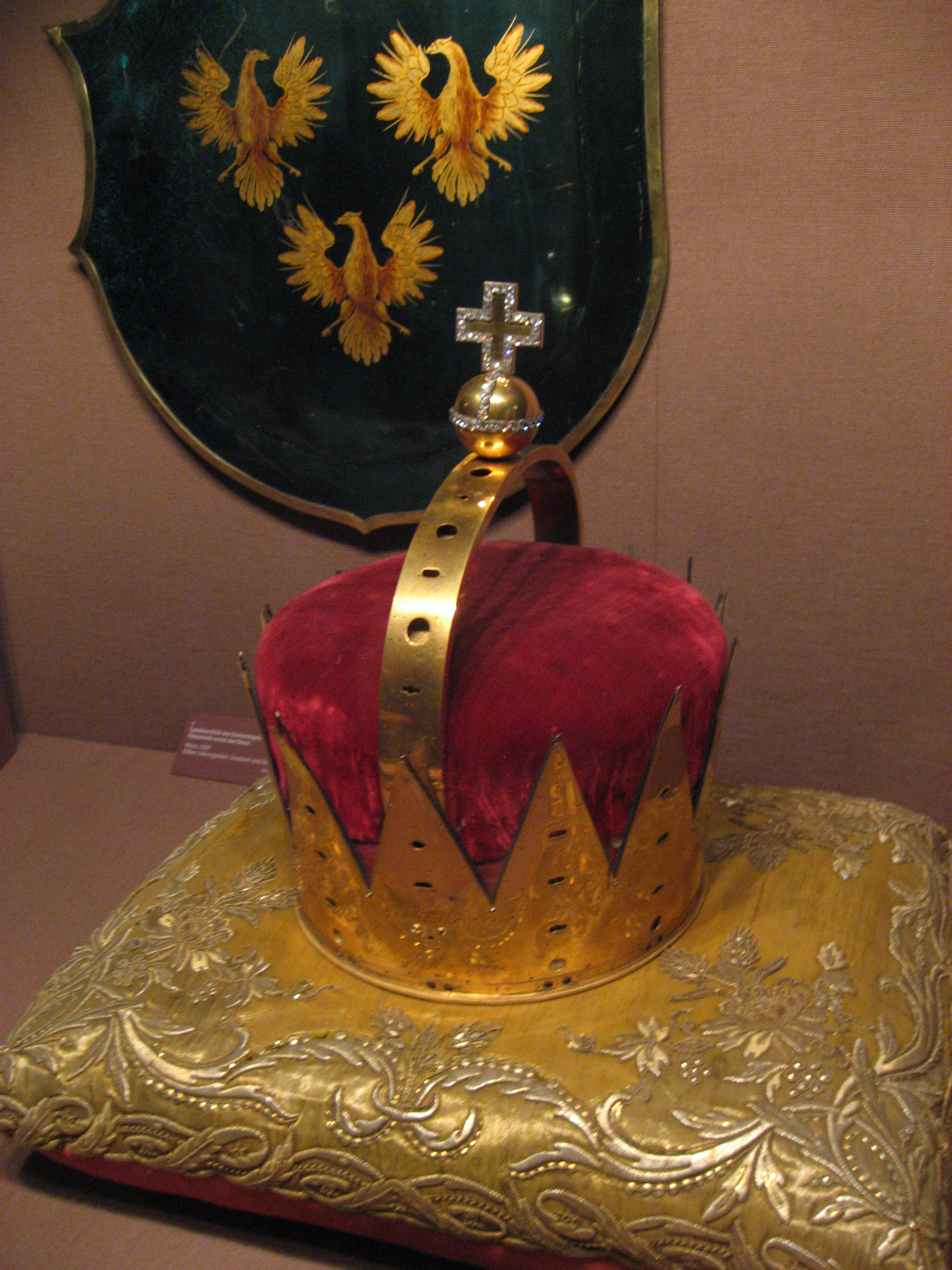
The frame of the coronet in the treasury of the Hofburg

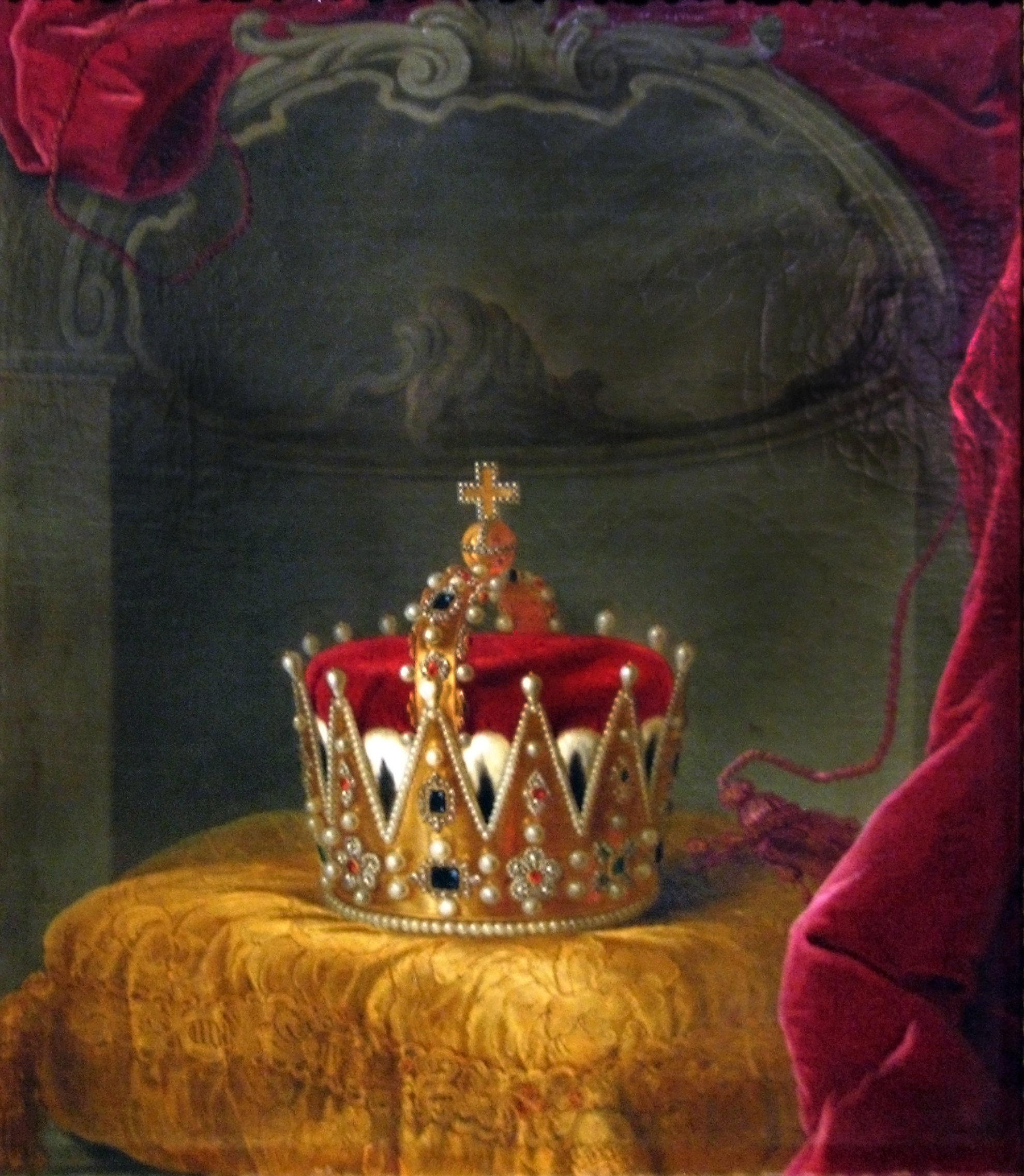
The archducal coronet in its original state

The archducal hat of Joseph II is an imperial insignia of Joseph II, Holy Roman Emperor.

== History ==
The Habsburg dynasty used the archducal hat on several occasions, such as the homage paid by the estates. Since the 16th century, it was worn as a sign of their rank as archdukes of Austria in the procession prior to the Imperial coronation at Frankfurt am Main. Since the custodians of the archducal hat at Klosterneuburg Monastery refused to allow the archducal hat to be used by Joseph II for the procession preceding his coronation at Frankfurt am Main in 1764, a new archducal coronet had to be created.

This new coronet did not follow the pattern of the hat in Klosterneuburg. It consisted of a golden eastern coronet with pearls and precious stones. A flat velvet cap encircled by ermine was included. Having only one arch, it resembled the original archducal coronet introduced by Rudolph IV of Austria. At the center of the arch, it is surmounted by a globe and cross.

After the coronation, the coronet became obsolete. The jewels and pearls were removed and were used for other purposes. Its frame, however, survived and can be seen in the Imperial Treasury, Vienna. Its original state can be seen in a contemporary painting of Joseph II.
