= Archducal hat of Tyrol =

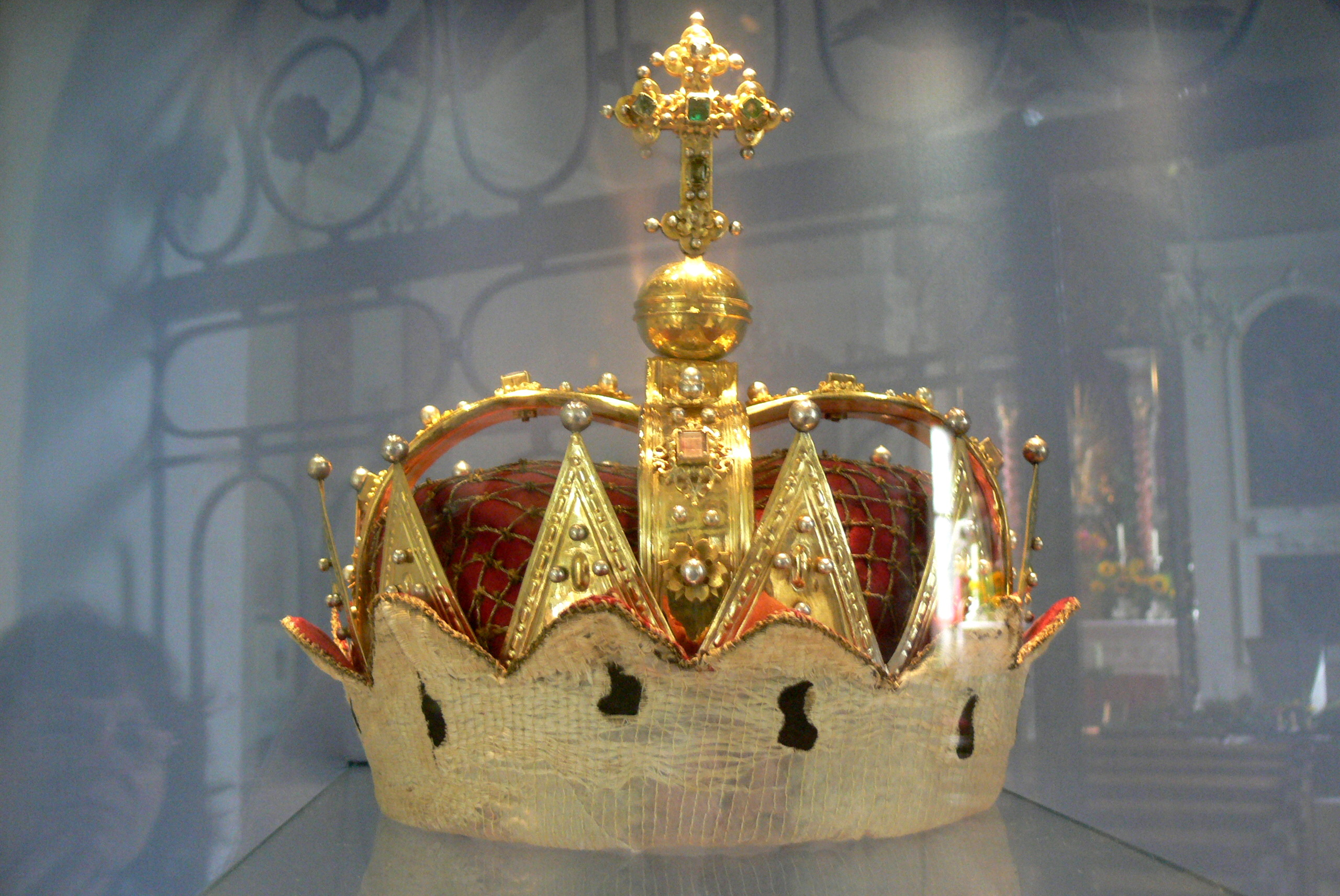
The archducal hat of Tyrol at Mariastein Church

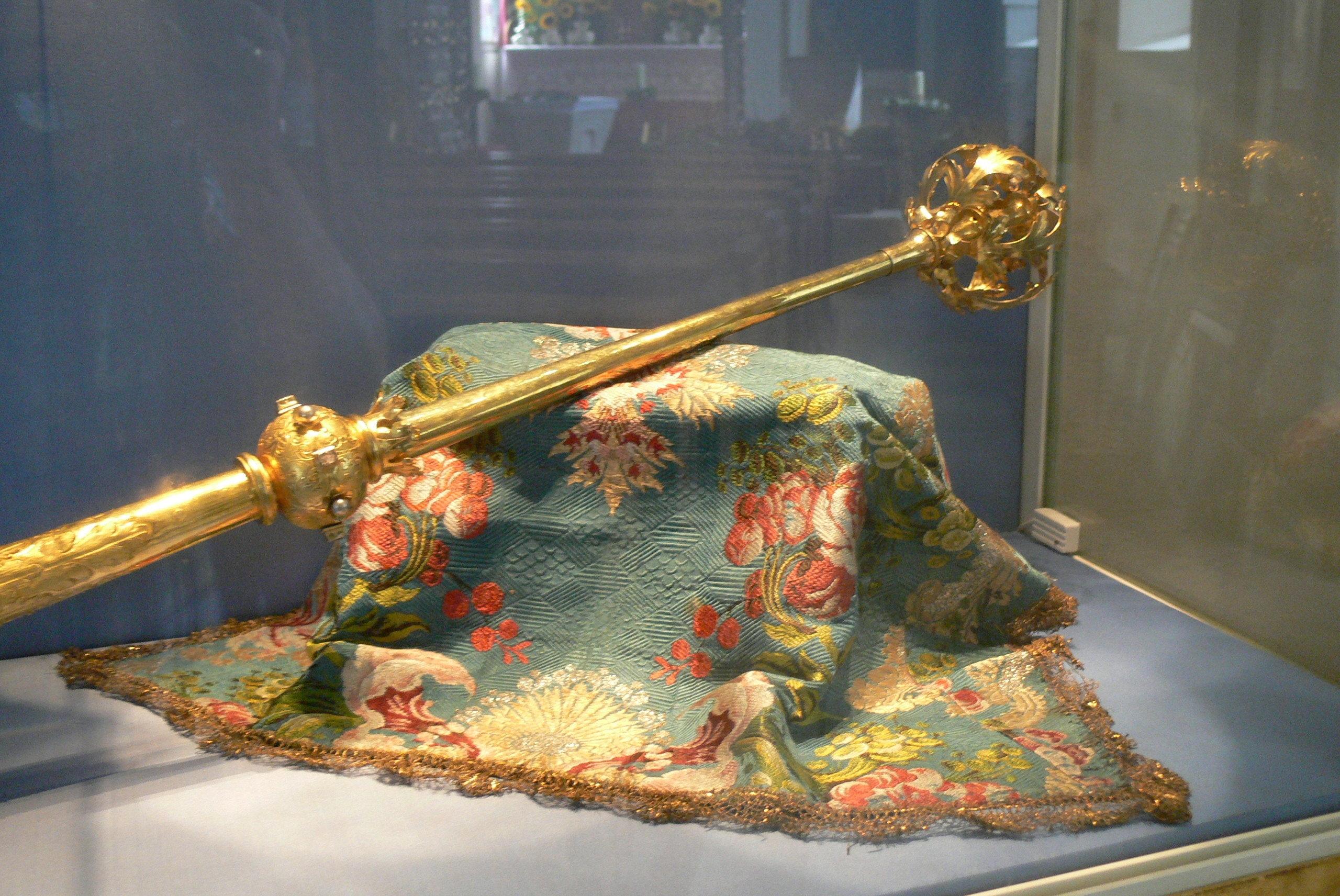
Sceptre of the archduke, also kept at Mariastein

The archducal hat of Tyrol is an insignia of the County of Tyrol. It is located in the treasury of Mariastein.

== History ==
Its design resembles the original archducal hat and depictions on coins of the archdukes Ferdinand I and Ferdinand II of Tyrol. It consists of a gilded copper circlet which rests ten triangular gables with precious stones and ornaments. It is closed with two arches surmounted by a globe and cross at the center. The copper circlet is hidden by the crimson cap which was originally turned up with ermine. The ermine has been lost over time and was replaced with silk in ermine pattern. Both the hat and the sceptre were probably made in 1602.

Although the Tyrol was a county, the hat is called archducal hat since its ruler Maximilian III was an imperial Habsburg archduke, which is a higher rank than the count of Tyrol. He appears to have considered it unsuitable for his personal use after personal examination of the hat at Innsbruck in 1613. It was given as a votive offering to the church in Mariastein.
