= Jean Bérenger =

French historian (1934–2024)

- Born: 2 October 1934
- Died: 8 September 2024 (age 90)
- Occupations: Historian, university professor
- Board member of: Professor at the Faculty of History of the Paris-Sorbonne University
- Awards: Limantour Prize (2005)

Academic background
- Education: Paris-Sorbonne University

Academic work
- Main interests: History of Central Europe, History of Eastern Europe, Military history, Habsburgs

Jean Bérenger (2 October 1934 – 8 September 2024) was a French historian, director of research at the CNRS, professor at the Faculty of History of the University of Strasbourg and, starting from 1990, at the University of Paris-Sorbonne.

Bérenger specializes in the history of the countries of Central and Eastern Europe and in military history, mainly of the modern era, but has also published works on the contemporary era. His doctorate dealt with the history of Austria and Hungary in the 17th century. Bérenger died on 8 September 2024, at the age of 90.

== Work ==
In 1974, he suggested other historians of the 17th century to "see, and study, minister-favorites not only in a national context but as a 'European phenomenon.'" His seminal 1974 Annales article on "royal favourites" has been credited as an important comparative study on the subject. He argued that the simultaneous success of several 17th-century minister-favorites in their respective countries was not coincidental, but reflected some change that took place in the period. J.H. Elliot and Lawrence Brockliss's work (that culminated in the collection of essays The World of the Favourite), undertaken to explore the matter put forward by Bérenger, became the most important comparative treatment of this subject.

In 1975, he published what in the 2020s was still the only modern survey of the financial relationship between Government and Estates in the period between the Peace of Westphalia and the Treaty of Aix-la-Chapelle.

== Incomplete list of works ==
- Tolérance ou paix de religion en Europe centrale : 1415-1792, Honoré Champion, 2000 ISBN 978-2-7453-0189-5

- Prix Monseigneur-Marcel 2001 of the Académie française

- L'Autriche-Hongrie, 1815-1918, Armand Colin, 1998 ISBN 978-2-200-21743-3
- La révolution militaire en Europe (XV^{e}-XVIII^{e} siècles), Economica, 1998 sous la direction de Jean Bérenger.
- Guerre et paix dans l'Europe du XVII^{e} siècle, Sedes, 1995, trois tomes. ISBN 978-2-7181-3215-0, ISBN 978-2-7181-3506-9
- Histoire de l'Autriche, Presses universitaires de France, 1994 ISBN 978-2-13-046685-7 (collection Que sais-je ? n° 222)
- Histoire de l'empire des Habsbourg, 1273-1918, Fayard, 1990 ISBN 978-2-213-02297-0
- Turenne, Fayard, 1987 ISBN 978-2-213-01970-3 - nombreuses rééditions - Une biographie de ce grand seigneur du XVII^{e} siècle qui s'inscrit dans le double registre de l'histoire militaire élargie à la géopolitique et de l'histoire sociale.
- La Tchécoslovaquie, Presses universitaires de France, 1978 ISBN 978-2-13-035537-3 (collection Que sais-je ? n° 1726)
- La République autrichienne de 1919 à nos jours, Klincksieck/Didier, 1971 ISBN 978-2-86460-583-6
- Joseph d'Autriche : serviteur de l'État, Fayard, 2007 ISBN 978-2-213-63458-6
- 'Pour une enquête européenne, l'histoire du ministeriat au XVIIe siècle', Annales Economies Sociétés Civilisations, 29, 1, février 1974, p. 166-192.
