= Archducal hat =

Insignia of the Archduchy of Austria

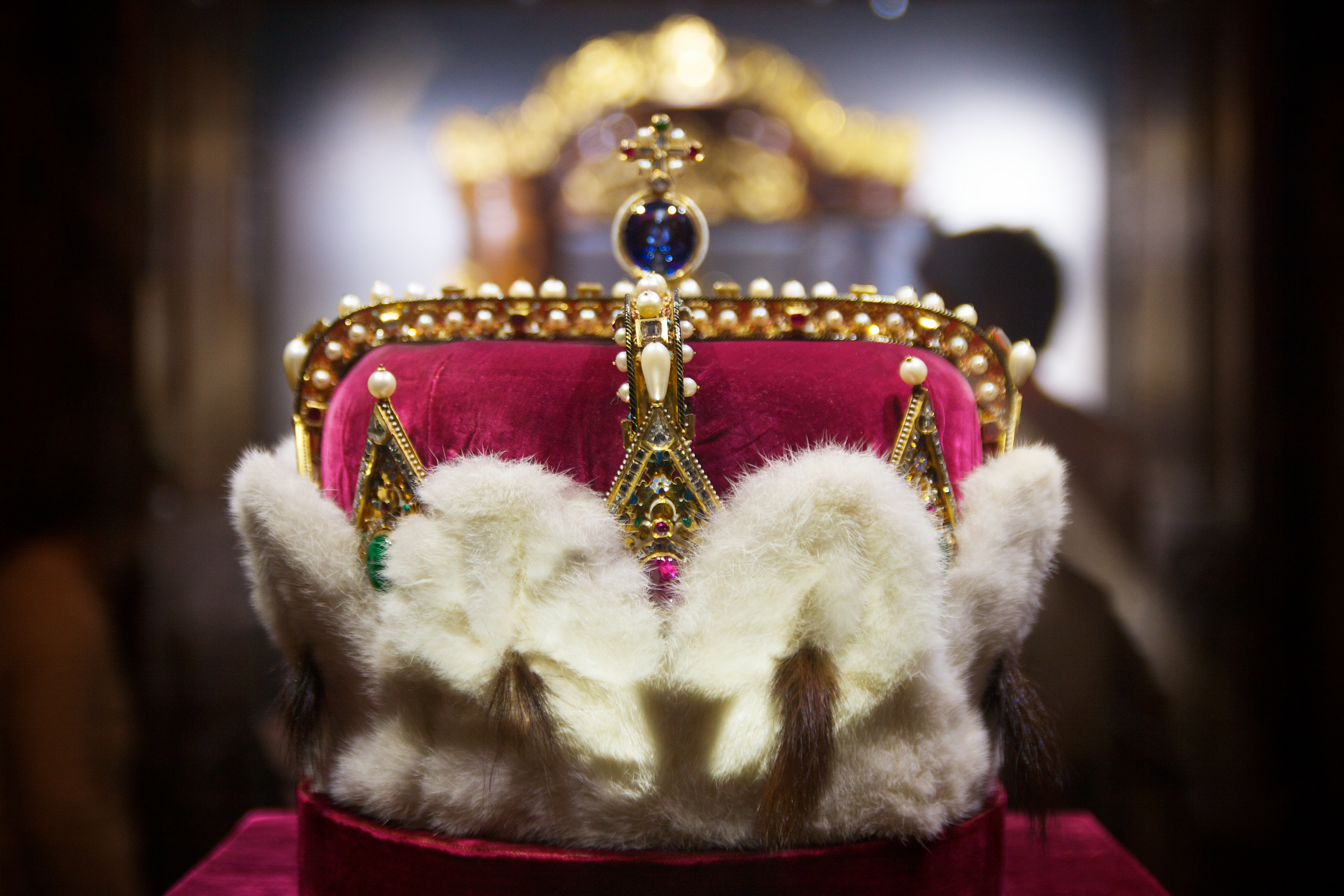
- The archducal hat, at Klosterneuburg Monastery

Heraldic depictions

Details
- Country: Austria
- Made: XIV century
- Arches: 4
- Material: Gold
- Cap: Red velvet
- Notable stones: Diamonds, rubies, sapphires
- Other elements: Ermine

The archducal hat (German: Erzherzogshut) is the insignia of the Archduchy of Austria and is kept in the treasury of Klosterneuburg Monastery.

It appears in heraldry such as the state coat of arms of Upper Austria.

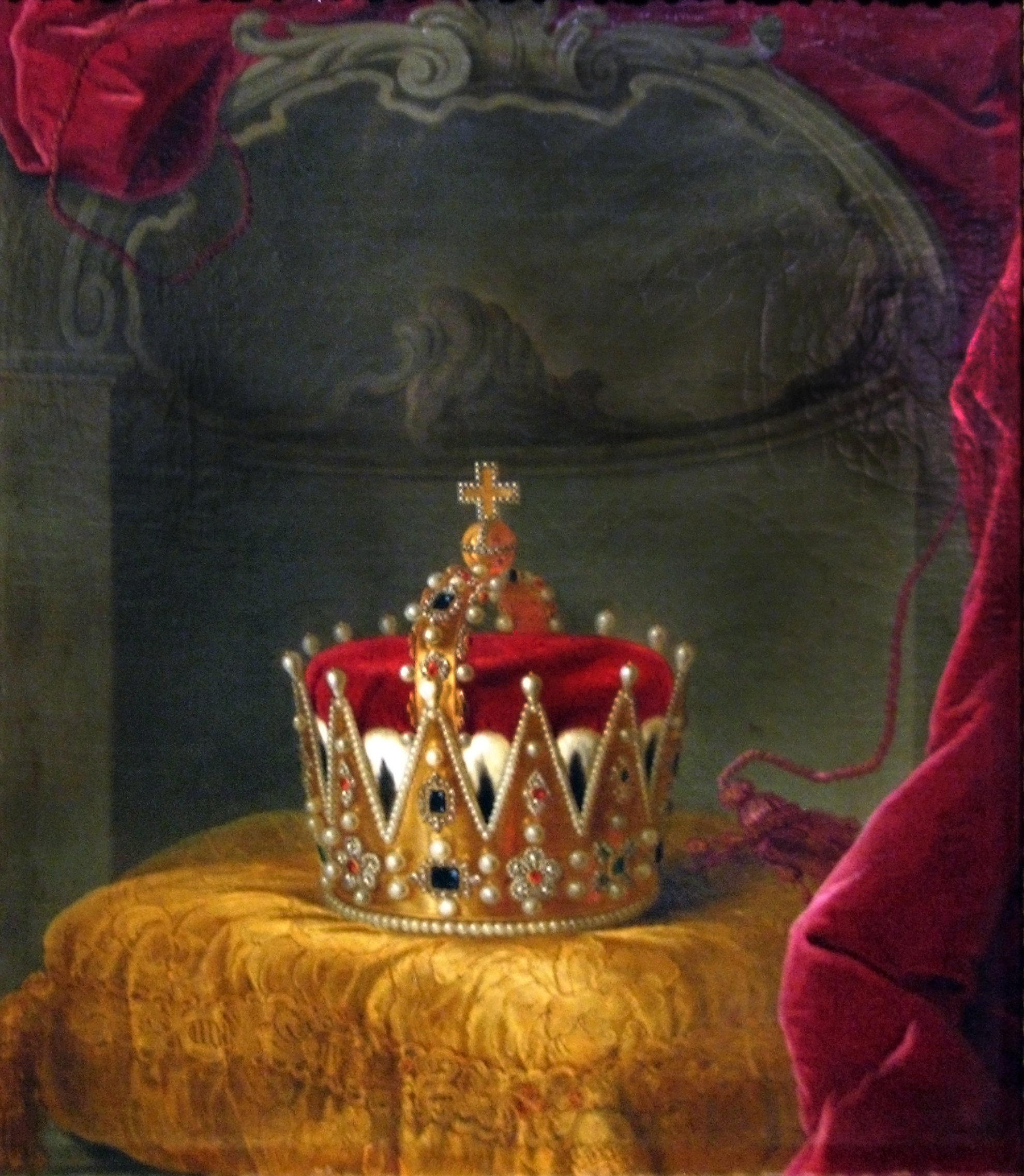
Painting of the archducal hat of Joseph II, Holy Roman Emperor

== History ==
The first archducal coronet (Erzherzogskrone) was shown on a portrait of Rudolf IV, Duke of Austria, though this coronet probably never existed. Ernest the Iron (1377–1424) had a coronet made, and another was made on the death of Archduke Ferdinand II of the Tyrol in 1595.

The final crown of the Archduchy of Austria was made in 1616 for the regent of the Tyrol, Maximilian III. Its place of production remains unknown. It is kept at Klosterneuburg Monastery in Lower Austria. It was brought to Vienna in 1620 for the Ceremony of Homage by the Estates (the so-called Erbhuldigung) for the new ruler, and was last there in 1835.

Margaret of Austria, aunt of Emperor Charles V and Regent of the Netherlands, is also shown wearing one on her tomb by Conrad Meit and in some images. Since one had to be made for her funeral, she probably never wore a version while alive. Hers is a plain uncovered hoop with large zig-zag projections upwards.

An archducal hat of Tyrol was made for Maximilian III, Archduke of Austria in 1602 and is kept as a votive offering at the church of Mariastein in Tyrol. Another example (the archducal hat of Joseph II) was made for Joseph II in 1764 for his coronation as Holy Roman Emperor in Frankfurt, of which only the metal frame remains today.

Another insignia of the Habsburg rulers is the ducal hat of Styria, which is kept in the Landesmuseum Joanneum in Graz, Styria.

== Symbolism ==
Coat of arms of Upper Austria crowned with the archducal hat

The coat of arms of the federal state of Upper Austria features the archducal hat on the top. It formerly appeared on the coat of arms of Lower Austria, until 1918.

== See also ==
- Austrian Crown Jewels
- Austrian Imperial Crown

== Literature ==
- G. Kugler, Der österreichische Erzherzogshut und die Erbhuldigung, in: Der heilige Leopold, Ausstellungskatalog, Klosterneuburg 1985.
