= Heinrich Appelt =

Austrian historian

- Born: 25 June 1910; Vienna, Austrian Empire
- Died: 16 September 1998 (aged 88); Vienna, Austria

Academic work
- Discipline: History

Heinrich Appelt (born 25 June 1910 in Vienna, d. 16 September 1998 in Vienna) was an Austrian historian.

== Works ==
- Die Urkundenfälschungen des Klosters Trebnitz. Studien zur Verfassungsentwicklung der deutschrechtlichen Klosterdörfer und zur Entstehung des Dominiums. Breslau 1940 (Veröffentlichungen der Historischen Kommission für Schlesien 2; Forschgen. z. schles. Urkundenbuch 2).
- Das Diplom Kaiser Heinrichs II. für Göss vom 1. Mai 1020. Eine diplomatisch-verfassungsgeschtliche Untersuchung. Mit einem Faksimile der Urkunde. Graz u.a. 1953.
- Die Kaiseridee Friedrich Barbarossas. Wien 1967 (SÖAW-PH 252/2).
- Privilegium minus. Das staufische Kaisertum und die Babenberger in Österreich. Wien, Köln u. Graz 1973 (Böhlau Quellenbücher), 2. Aufl. 1976.
- Kaisertum, Königtum, Landesherrschaft. Wien, Köln u. Graz 1988 (Mitteilungen des Instituts für Österreichische Geschichtsforschung, Beih. 28) (Zusammenstellung seiner Aufsätze).
- Regesta imperii, Neubearbeitung. Serie III, Salisches Haus 1024–1125, hg. v. Heinrich Appelt, III,1: Die Regesten des Kaiserreiches unter Konrad II. 1024–1039, Graz 1951.
