= Obermillstatt =

Coordinates: 46°48′38″N 13°35′27″E

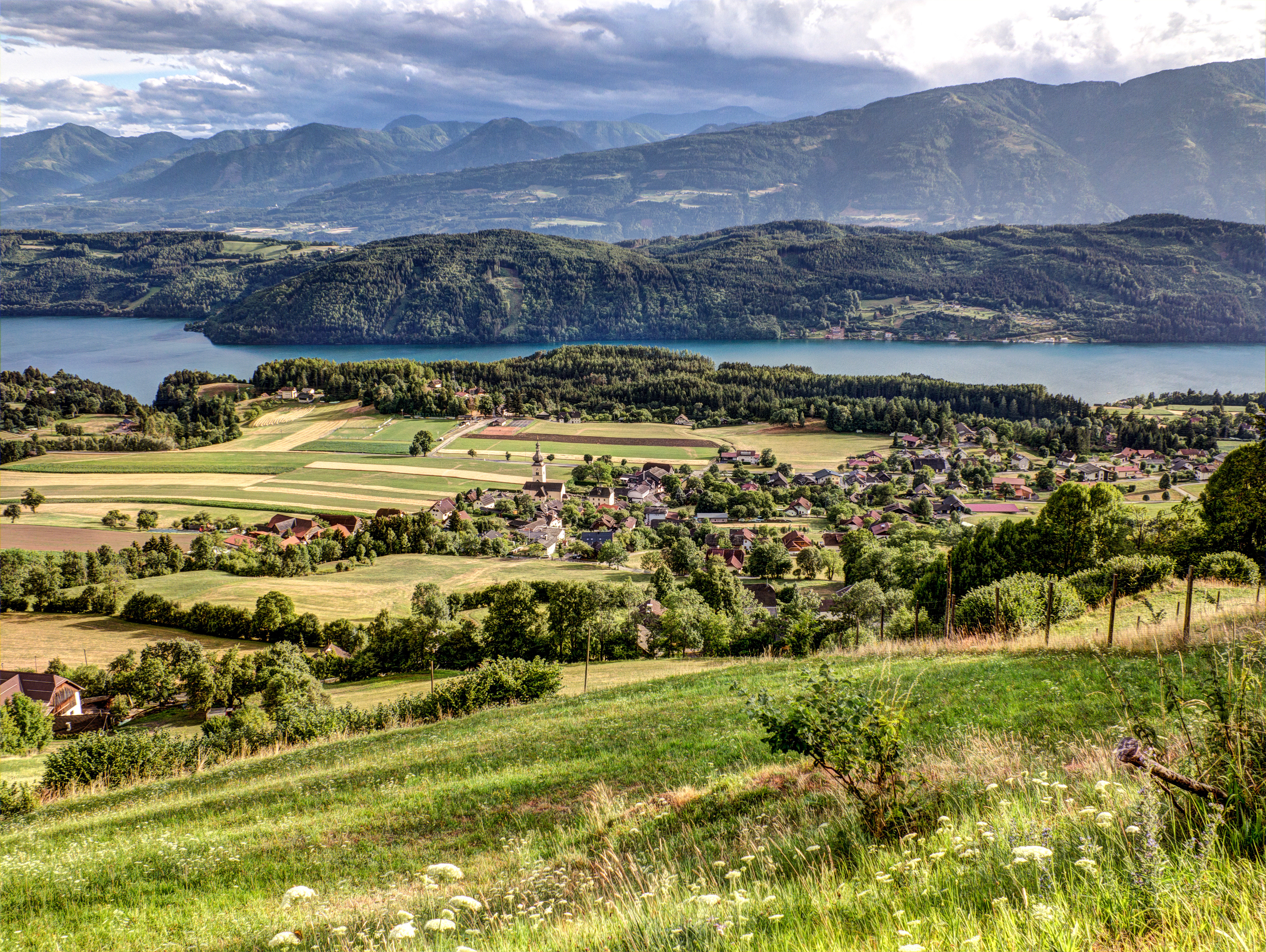
View towards Lake Millstatt and Gailtal Alps

Obermillstatt is a village and cadastral community in the municipality of Millstatt in Spittal an der Drau District, in Carinthia, Austria.

== Geography ==
The village lies on the southern slope of the Millstätter Alpe massif, part of the Gurktal Alps (Nock Mountains), at 857 m (2,812 ft) above sea level, on a plateau about 150 m (490 ft) above Lake Millstatt. It is reachable via the B 98 highway at Millstatt centre (2 km (1.2 mi) away) or via L 17 from Dellach or Seeboden, in a distance to the Tauern Autobahn (A10) of 9 km (5.6 mi)).

Several Alpine farms surround the structured village centre, with 492 inhabitants in total. Because of the lack of local undertakings, a large proportion of the working population commute daily. A major employer since 1907 is the RHI refractory company in 13 km (8.1 mi) away place Radenthein. Parts of the Magnesite occurrence on Millstätter Alpe belong to the area of Obermillstatt.

== History ==
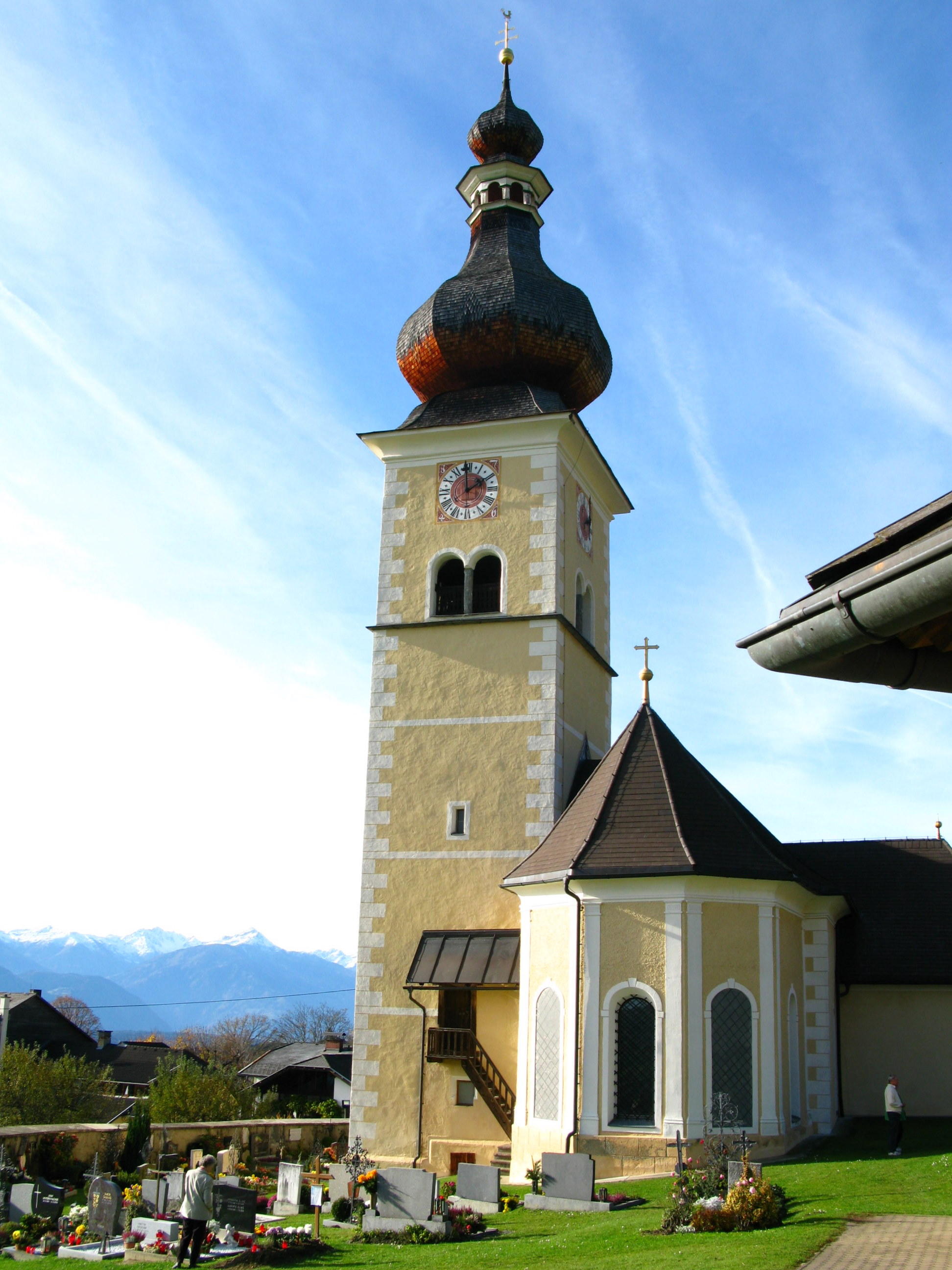
St. John's Church

Archaeological excavations date back to the Late Bronze Age (1200-1000 BC), when the Millstätter Berg plateau was settled by Illyrian, later also Celtic tribes, who had moved into the area from the northwestern Balkans. In the Roman province of Noricum (from 16 BC), a Roman road led along the Millstätter Berg slopes from the local capital Teurnia towards the Turracher Höhe Pass. During the Slavic settlement of the Eastern Alps from the 6th century AD in the Principality of Carantania, several settlements arose on the plateau, which came under Bavarian and Frankish influence in the late 8th century.

When about 1070 the Bavarian Aribonids established Millstatt Abbey, they vested it with extensive landed property, probably including a church in Obermillstatt ("Upper Millstatt"). However, the Catholic parish church St John the Baptist was not mentioned until 1205; the present building was erected under the Jesuit rule in 1614. Its Baroque furnishing includes a square groin vault apse and a high altar from around 1720. Situated on the slope above the village centre, the church can be widely seen by its massive tower with the big onion dome. For 84 years, from 1889 to 1973, Obermillstatt was a municipality in its own right.

In adjacent Matzelsdorf is the small pilgrimage church Maria Schnee (Our Lady of the Snows), which was first mentioned in 1177. The small but richly decorated nave has a Late Gothic lierne vault from the 16th century and Baroque frescoes of the Madonna from about 1716. The retable of the altar with a carving work of the coronation of Mary probably originates from around 1500. Near Laubendorf is the foundation of a small Early Christian church from the 5th century, which has been preserved in quite good condition. In the place of the altar is a former reliquary, covered by a Roman tombstone. The church probably was built as a refuge for the diocese of nearby Teurnia in the days of the Decline of the Roman Empire. It finally was abandoned around 600 when the Slavic Carantanians had entered the region.
