= 1st Carinthian Fishing Museum =

Museum in Carinthia, Austria

Coordinates: 46°48′50″N 13°30′34″E

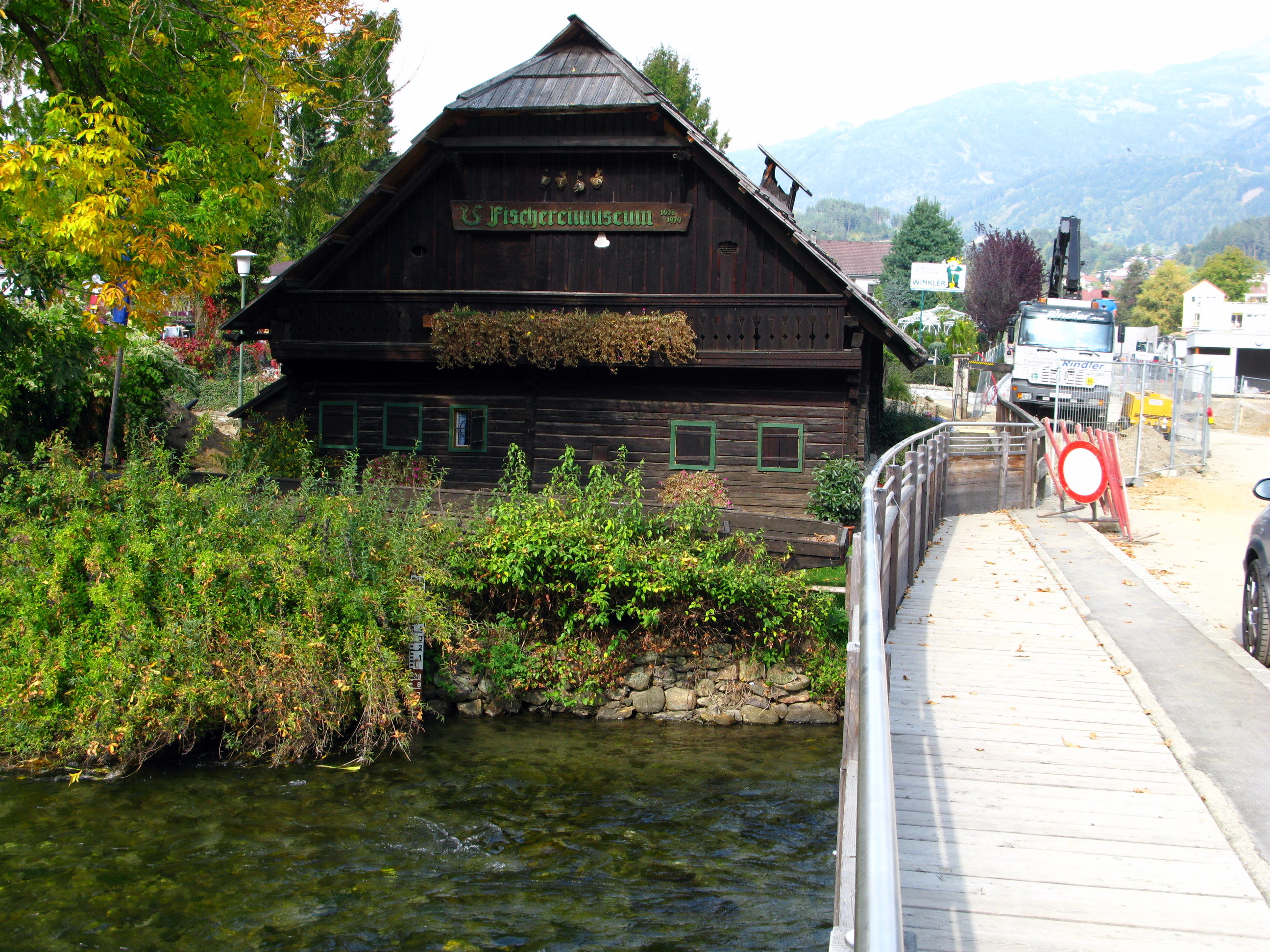
1st Carinthian Fishing Museum

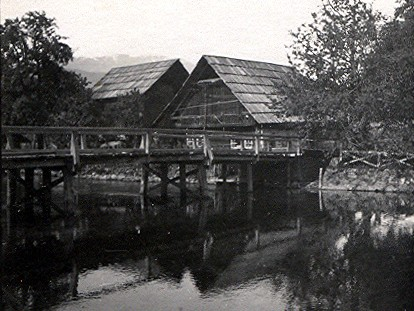
Brugger House around 1920

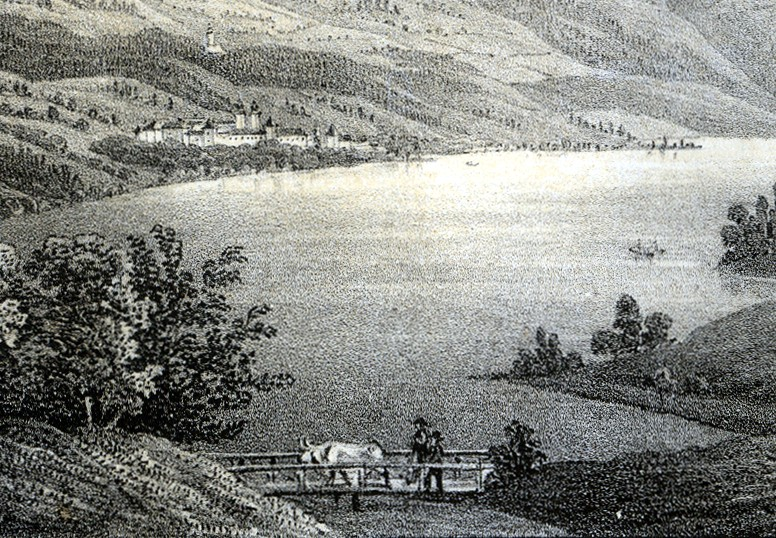
Outflow of Lake Millstatt around 1845

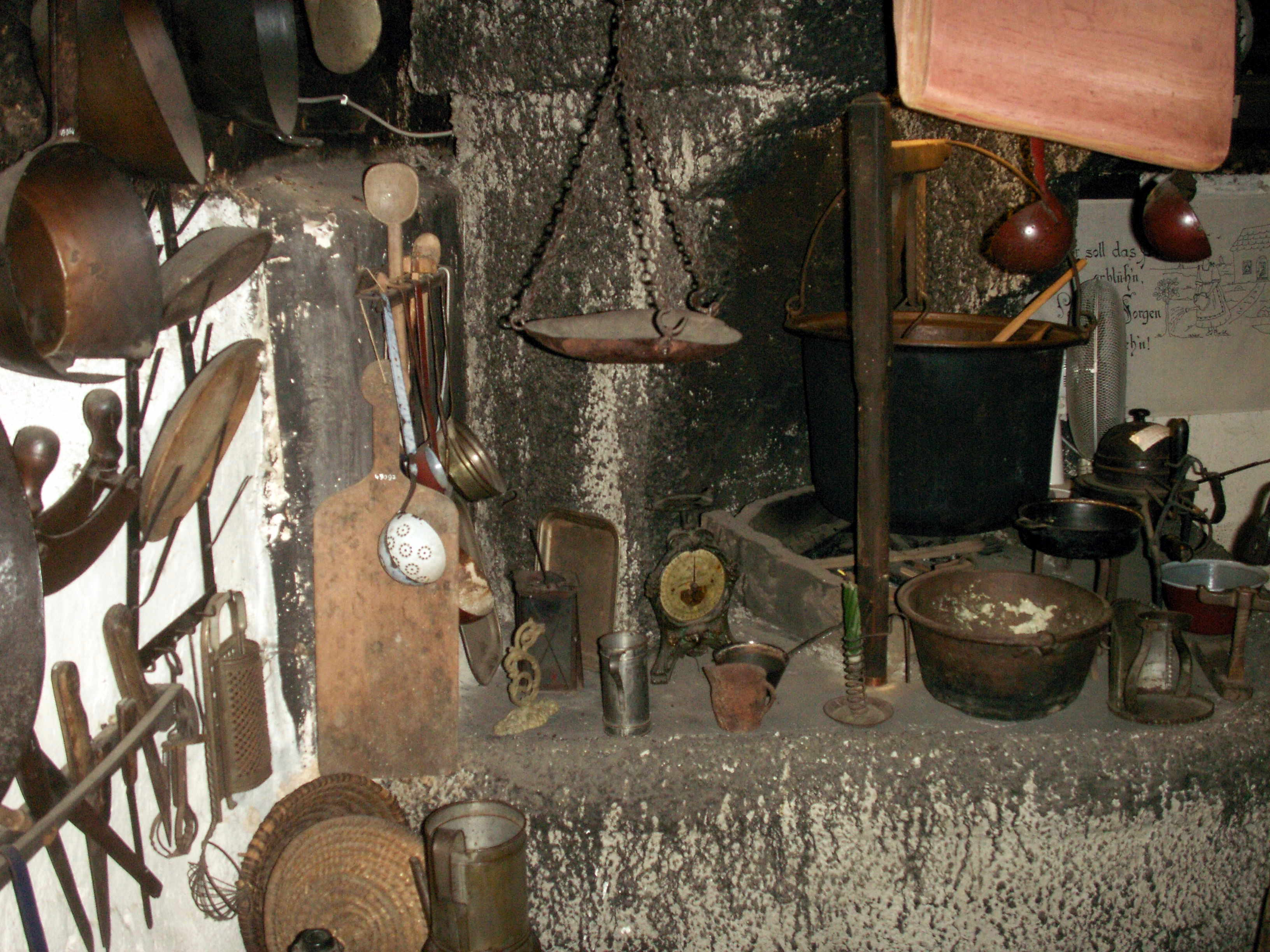
Smoke kitchen in the museum

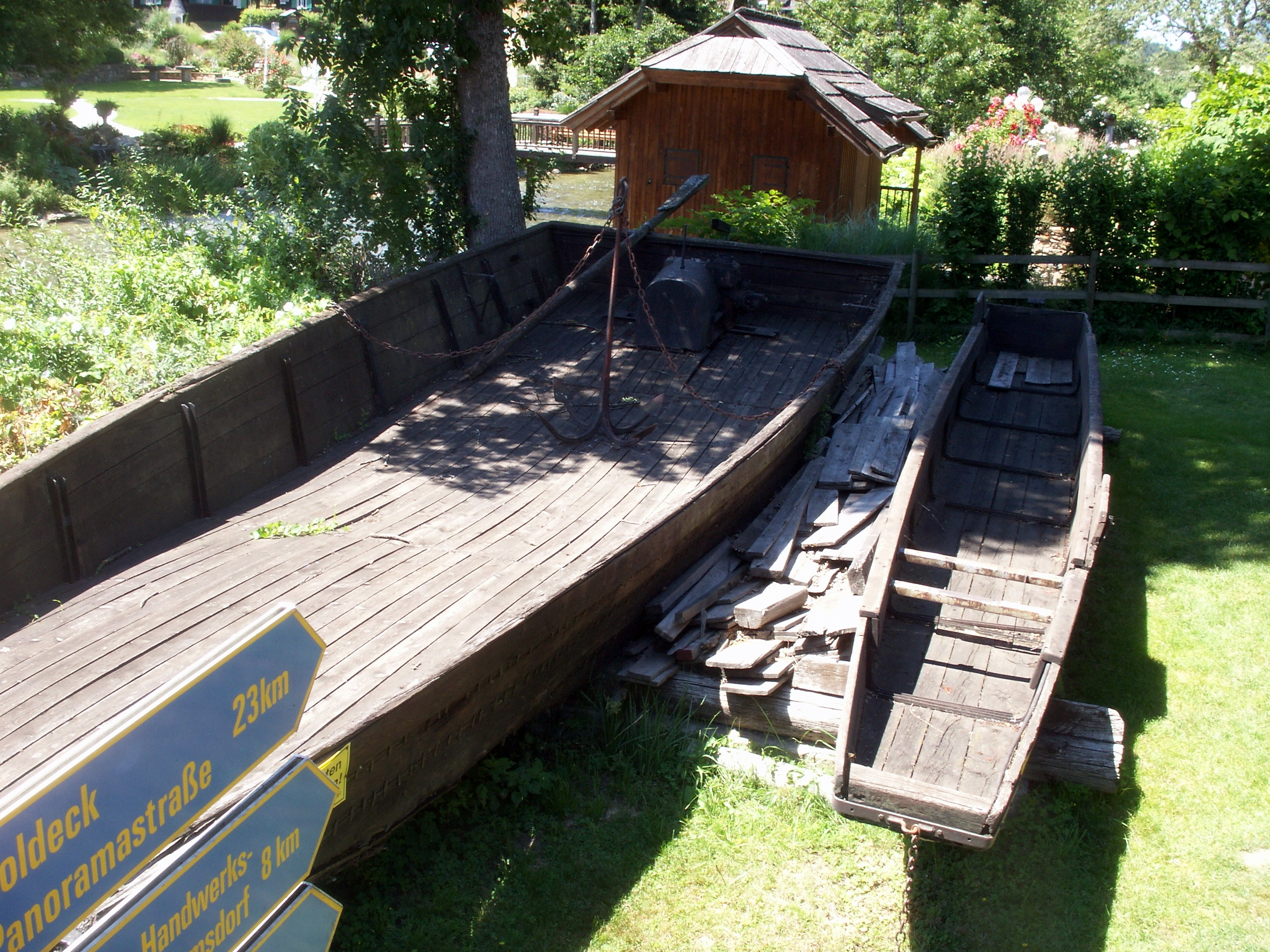
On the left, the last flatboat from Lake Millstatt, disposed of by the municipality of Seeboden in 2010

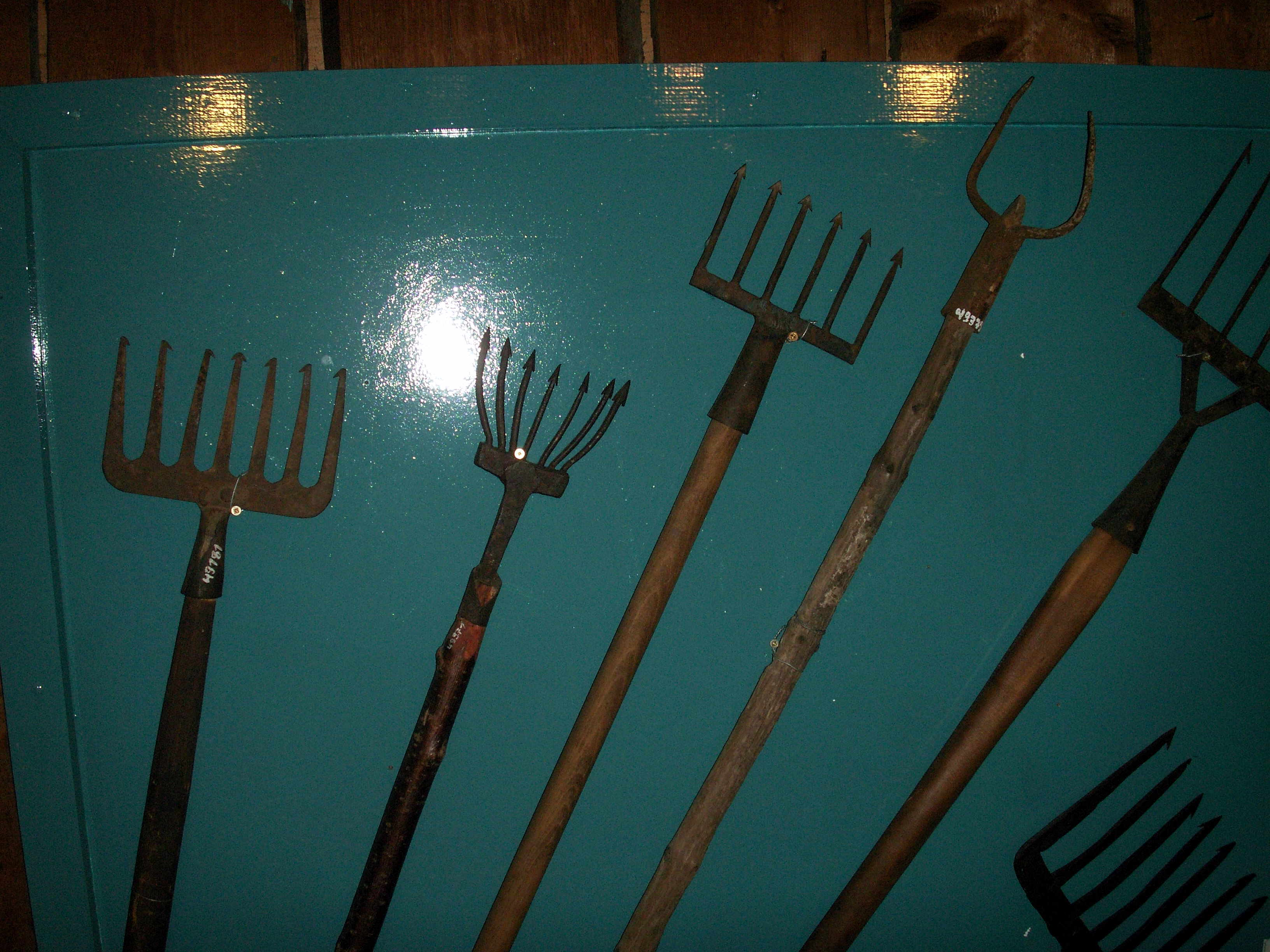
Fish spears for poaching

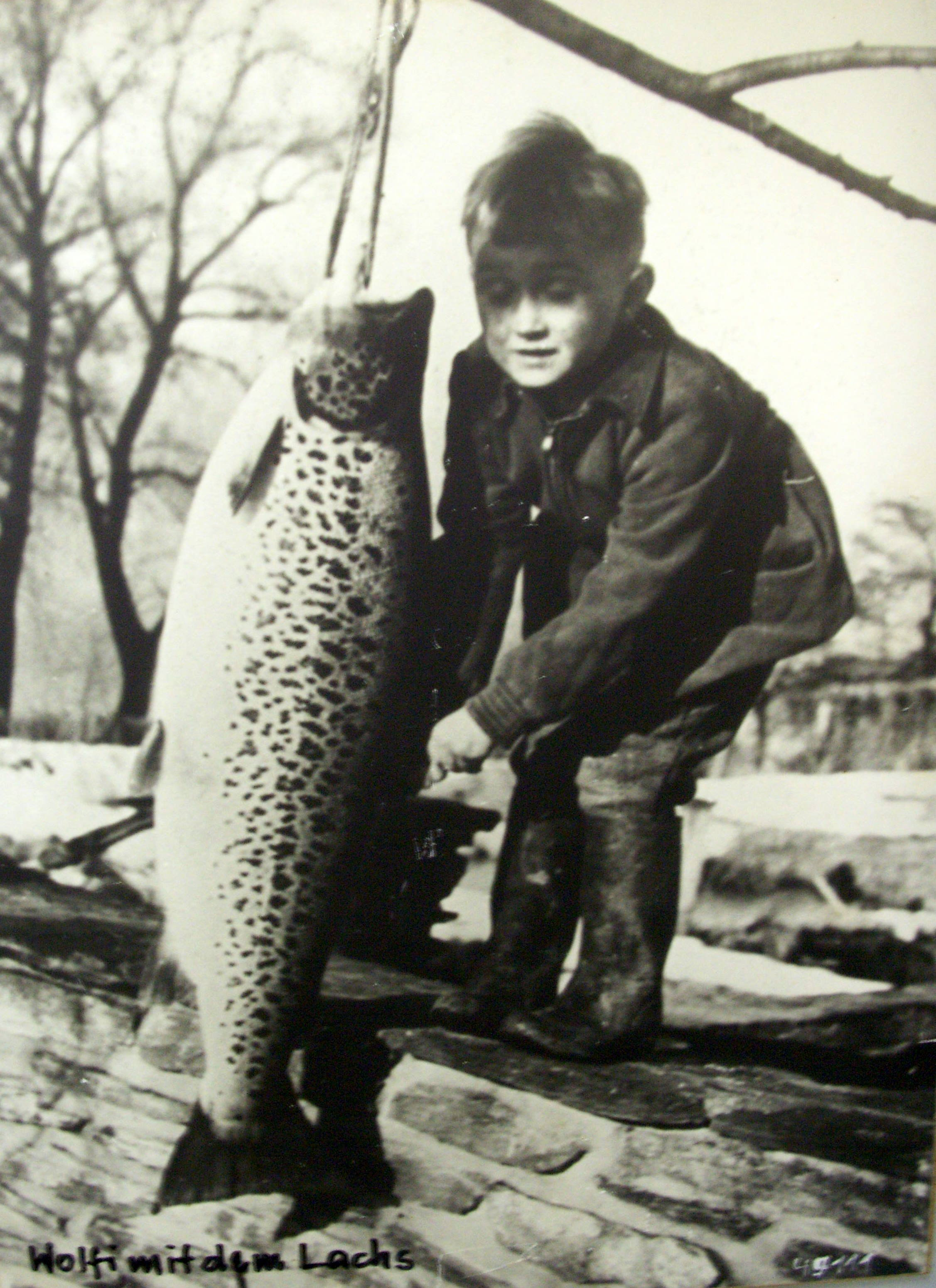
One of the last salmon

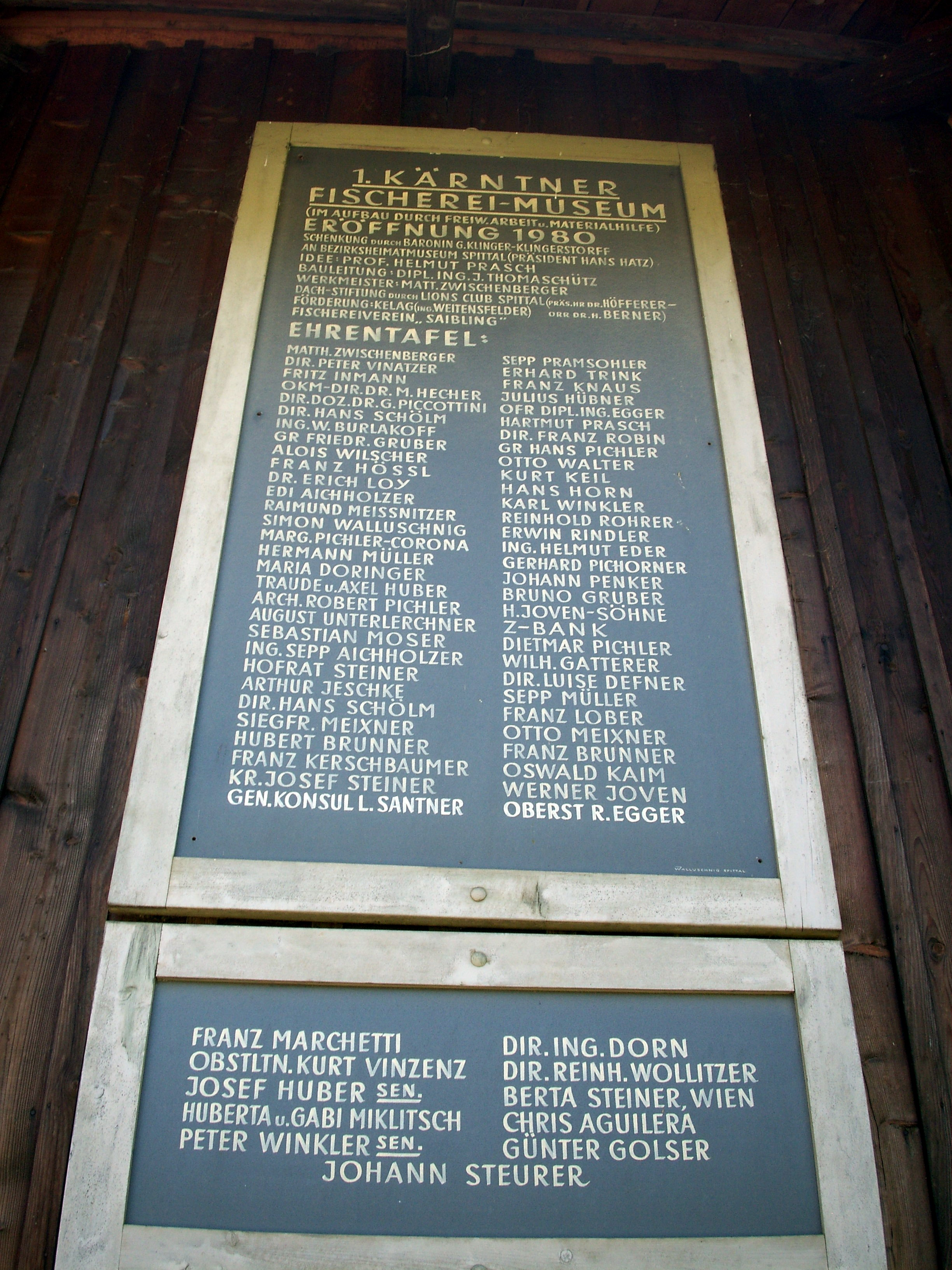
Acknowledgment for donations of goods, money, and work

The 1st Carinthian Fishing Museum is a museum in the western bay of Lake Millstatt in the district of Wirlsdorf in Seeboden, Carinthia, Austria, established in 1980. After a temporary closure from 2009 to mid-2011, the museum is now open again.

== The Brugger House ==
The Brugger House in the bay of Seeboden with the 1st Carinthian Fishing Museum is located at a historically important site. The house was named after the Steiner Bridge over the Seebach, the western outflow of Lake Millstatt, which was a river crossing used since Roman times, connecting the trading post in Baldersdorf near Molzbichl in the Drava Valley through a mountain pass sanctuary at Wolfsberg to Kötzing and Gmünd.

Due to its position at the outflow of the lake, the Brugger House was once the most productive fishing spot on Lake Millstatt. Using a fishing weir, known as a salmon weir or salmon fence, salmon could be caught here with little effort. Even the water level of the lake could be regulated for fishing purposes, leading to repeated disputes with the farmers in Döbriach at the other end of the lake. In the 18th century, conflicts between the fishermen of Ortenburg and the farmers under the Millstatt lordship seemed to escalate. Mediation attempts by the court judge and the superior of Millstatt Abbey were unsuccessful. In 1724, the lake had again risen "halfway up the field, thus everything was drowned". A delegation of farmers noted that there was a new, higher fence: "Once because of the many foundation stones and then because of the large boards that were put in to raise the water, the timberwork was a whole tree higher." In 1725, nothing changed, and the farmers resorted to self-help and destroyed half of the fence. The "aggressive attack" was considered a breach of the peace, and the farmers had to humbly apologize.

The Brugger property is first documented in 1084, when the estate Kraut "curtis Chrowat" with fishing rights was donated by a man named Werenher, whose name echoes in the place name Wirlsdorf, to the Reichersberg Abbey in Upper Austria. This excellent control and fishing spot was probably in use long before. At the bay, the westernmost point of Lake Millstatt, the waterway across the lake ended, which was much more important in the past. The current Millstätter Straße along the lake has only existed for a few hundred years. The old Roman road led over the Millstätter Berg. Around 1100, the lake fishermen of the County of Ortenburg lived in the Brugger House, first mentioned around 1450 in Millstatt. Due to the lack of meat in old times and the Christian fasting period, when fish meat was allowed, fishing rights were always an important right of a lordship. In a document about the nearby Castle Sommeregg it says: "Sommereck has its own fishing rights. The fisherman should bring fish to the castle every fast day."

Currently, commercial fishing around Lake Millstatt only plays a role for the gastronomy sector. Until the beginning of the 20th century, fish farming and trade were significant sources of income for the population. River regulation and the construction of power plants ended the migration of salmon from the sea to freshwater to their birthplace. The remnants of the former salmon weir, first mentioned in 1638 and visible in the water in front of the bridge, have now disappeared.

The building itself was constructed around 1610 in the style of a typical Carinthian smokehouse with a steep roof. The smoke room with a large open hearth was the main living and working space. The chimney in the hallway also served as a smokehouse for the salmon caught in the weir next to the house. In 1918, Baron Klinger von Klingerstorff bought the Porcia Castle in Spittal from the Prince of Porcia, which included the Brugger fisherman house, the grounds of today's Klinger Park, as well as fishing rights at the upper end of the lake and the outflow and parts of the Lieser.

== History of the Museum ==
Seeboden experienced a peak in mass tourism in the 1970s. To prevent the demolition of the dilapidated building, Baroness Gabrielle Klinger Klingerstorff, née Countess van der Straten-Ponthoz, donated the property in June 1979 to the Association of the District Museum Spittal/Drau (Museum of Folk Culture). One of the conditions was:

The recipient of the gift is obliged to establish and maintain a fishing museum in the Brugger fisherman house and to make this museum accessible to the public in an appropriate and customary manner. The recipient is entitled to transfer the property to any territorial authority, association, or other legal entity of the donor's choice, provided the transferee undertakes to maintain and continue the fishing museum and assume the above obligation.

With the concept and organization of voluntary donations of money, goods, and work by Helmut Prasch, the versatile Upper Carinthian museum founder, the 1st Carinthian Fishing Museum was opened in 1980. In 1996, Fritz Rathke reorganized the museum's content. The fishing museum was awarded the Austrian Museum Quality Seal by ICOM Austria (International Council of Museums, Austrian National Committee) and the Austrian Museums Association. In 2008, the association sold the fishing museum to the municipality of Seeboden, which acquired the museum for the WaterLife tourism project on Lake Millstatt. However, the municipality of Seeboden ceased museum operations at the end of 2008 and renovated the building for 220,000 euros, primarily for office use by the tourism association. Since the summer of 2011, the museum has been in operation again. From 2020 to 2022, the building was further renovated and enlarged with a new extension for museum purposes. The museum is part of the Kulturverein (Seeboden).

== Literature ==
- Edi Rauter: Seeboden. A spa town on Lake Millstatt. Carinthia Publishing House, Klagenfurt, 1976, ISBN 978-3-85378-015-2.
- Helmut Prasch, Reinhard Bock: The Brugger fisherman house. 1st Carinthian Fishing Museum, 1981.
- Axel Huber: 400 years of Brugger House. A historical house and its museum in Seeboden. In: Historical Society for Carinthia: Carinthia I. Journal for the historical regional studies of Carinthia. 197th year, volume 3, Klagenfurt 2007, pp. 167–176.
- Gerhard Lang, Helmuth Gugl: Seeboden. A market town and its history. Verlag Johannes Heyn, Klagenfurt, 2022, ISBN 978-3-7084-0704-0.
