= Millstatt am See =

Millstatt
- Municipality
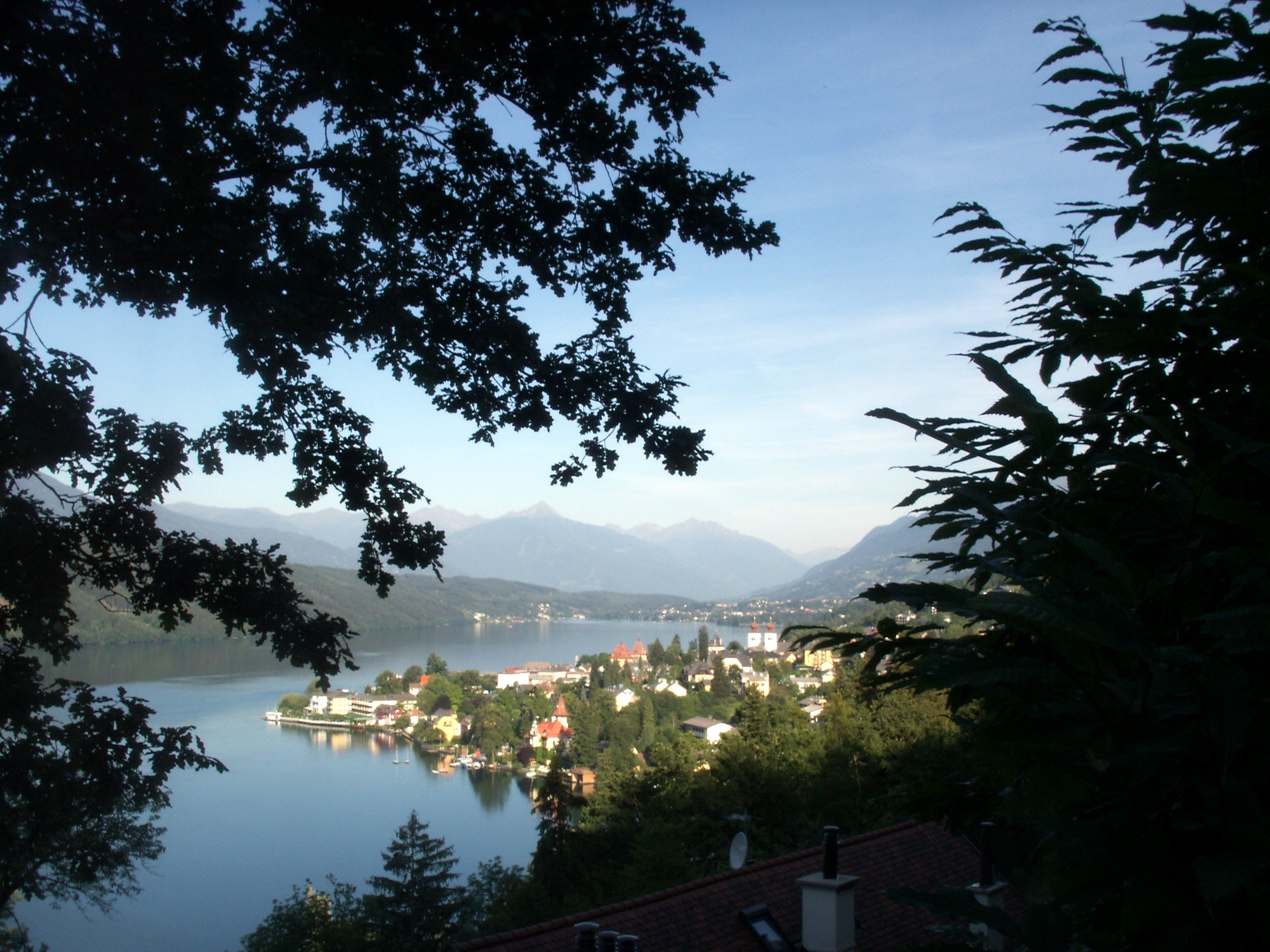

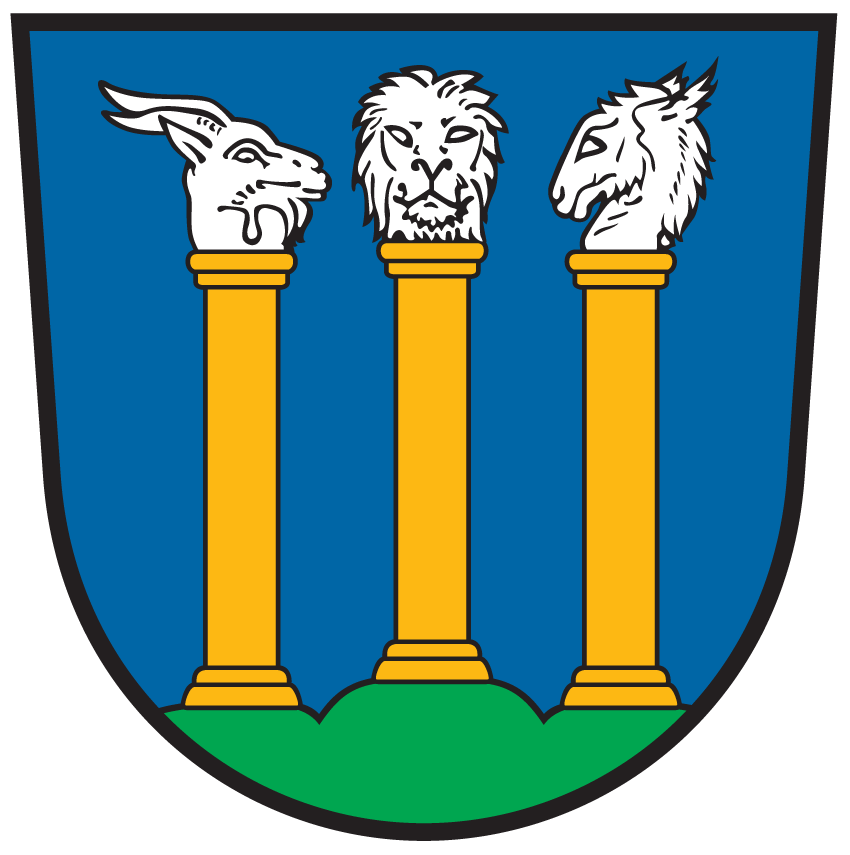
- Coat of arms

- Location within Austria
- Coordinates: 46°48′19″N 13°34′18″E
- Country: Austria
- State: Carinthia
- District: Spittal an der Drau

Government
  - Mayor: Alexander Thoma (ÖVP)

Area
  - Total: 57.74 km^{2} (22.29 sq mi)
- Elevation: 611 m (2,005 ft)

Population (2018-01-01)
  - Total: 3,460
  - Density: 59.9/km^{2} (155/sq mi)
- Time zone: UTC+1 (CET)
  - Summer (DST): UTC+2 (CEST)
- Postal code: 9872
- Area code: 4766
- Vehicle registration: SP

Millstatt am See (Note: Until June 2012, Millstatt.) is a market town of the Spittal an der Drau District in Carinthia, Austria. The traditional health resort and spa town on Lake Millstatt is known for former Benedictine Millstatt Abbey, founded about 1070.

== Geography ==
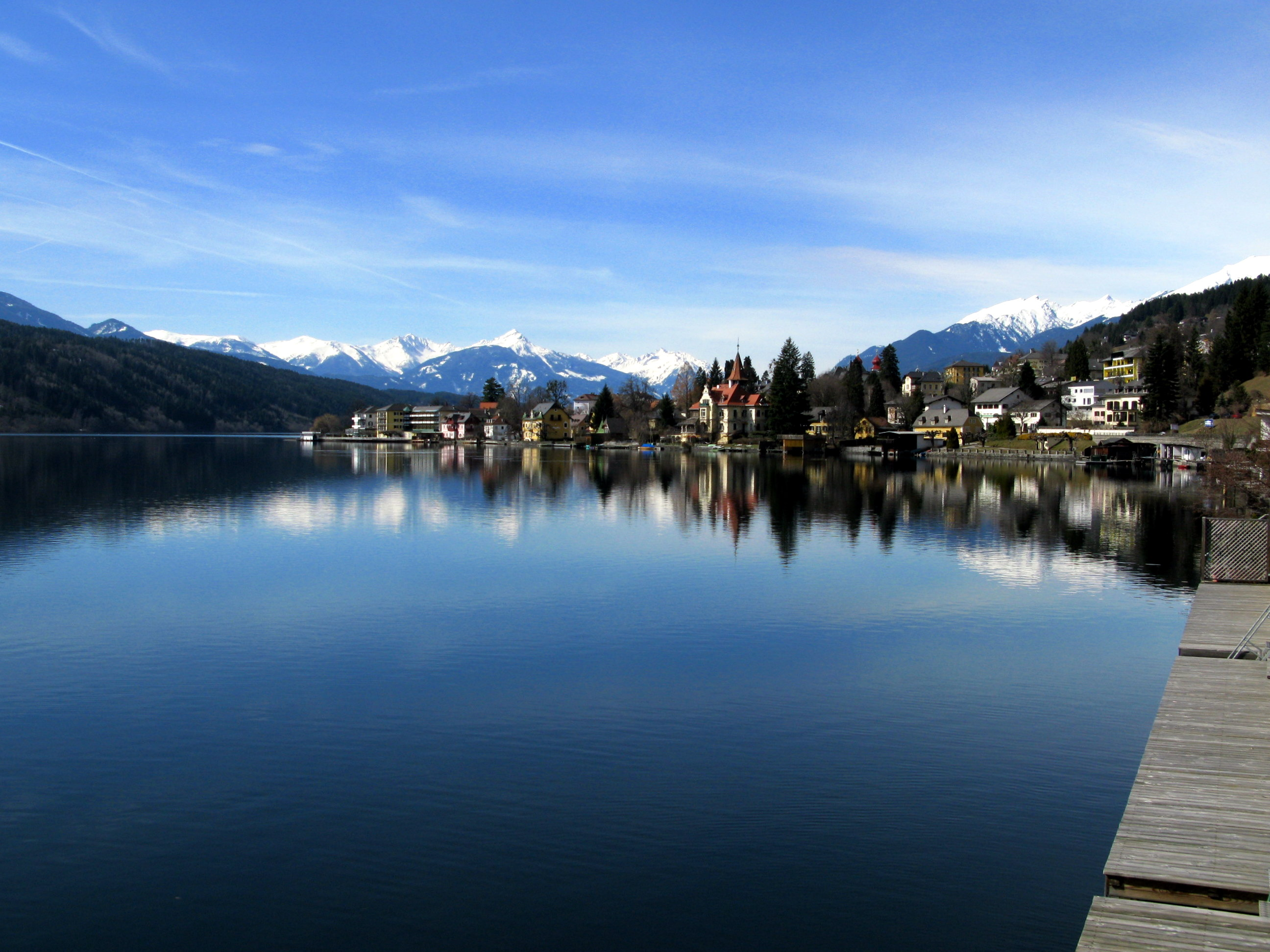
Lakeside

It is situated on the southern slope of the Gurktal Alps (Nock Mountains), on an alluvial fan peninsula on the lake's northern shore. The municipal area reaches from an elevation of 588 m (1,929 ft) at the lakeside to 2,101 m (6,893 ft) AA at the crest of the Millstätter Alpe massif. It comprises the cadastral communities of Millstatt proper, Obermillstatt, Matzelsdorf, and Laubendorf.

Beneath the Millstatt marketplace stand the extensive buildings of the former Benedictine monastery with its four massive towers and the monastery church at the highest point.

== History ==
While the oldest archaeological artifacts found in the area date back to the Neolithic, the name "Millstatt" may refer to the Celtic expression "mils" meaning mountain stream or brook. The Celts entered this region from the 5th century BC onwards, their kingdom Noricum came under control of the Roman Empire in 16 BC. During the Migration Period in the 6th century Slavic tribes settled here in the principality of Carantania, which became a march of Bavaria and the Frankish Empire in the late 8th century. According to legend, a Carantanian duke Domitian († 802?) converted to Christianity and built the first church of Millstatt. He also had one thousand statues of pagan gods ("mille statuae", see the coat of arms) gathered and thrown into the lake.

=== Millstatt Abbey ===
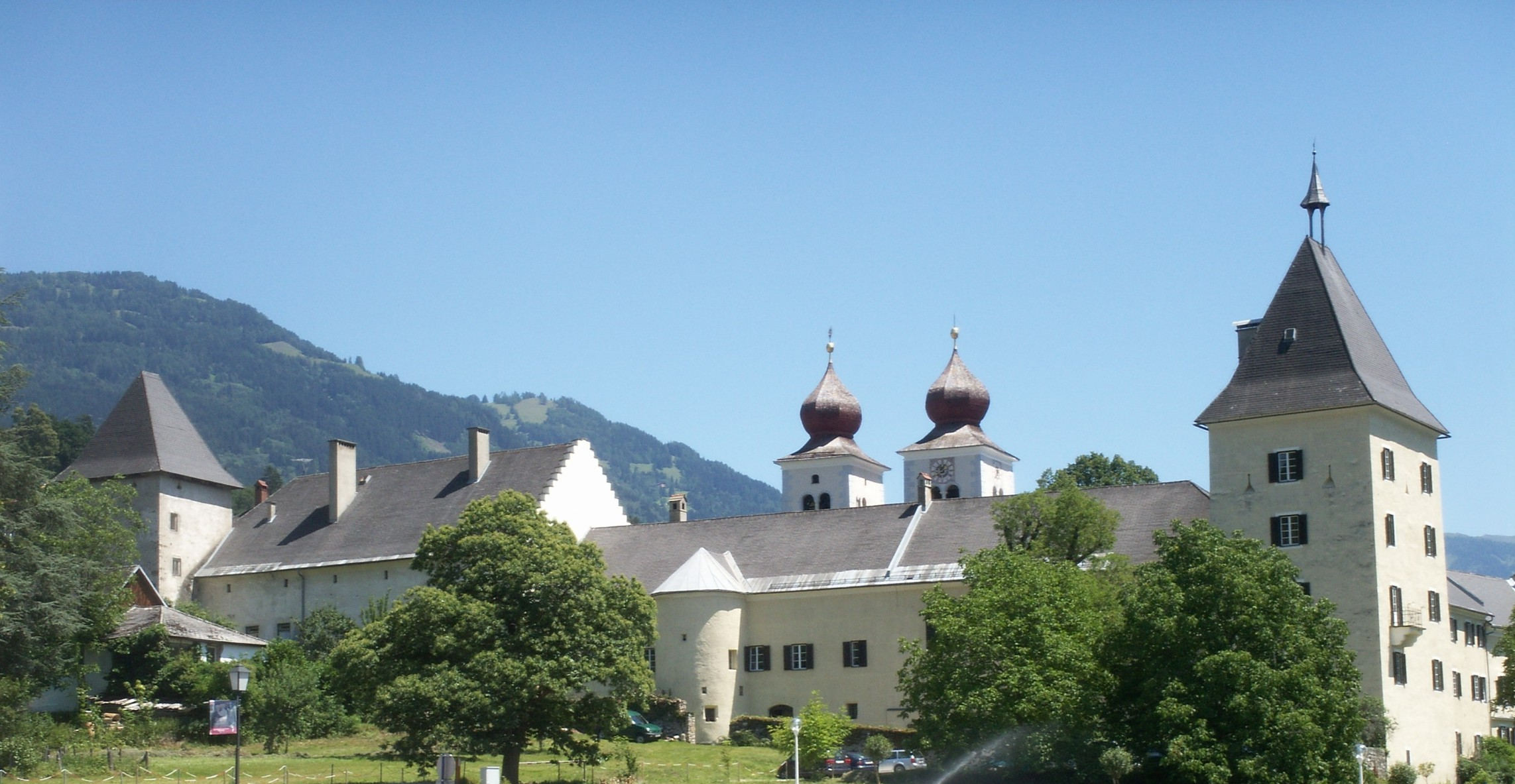
Millstatt Abbey

About 1070 the Bavarian Count Palatine Aribo II and his brother Poto established Millstatt Abbey, a Benedictine monastery, in Millstatt including a donation of extensive landed property around the lake and estates in Salzburg and Friuli. Although no document is saved the first monks probably descended from Hirsau Abbey. The monastery church, now parish church of Christ the Savior and All Saints, was erected in the second quarter of the 12th century. It replaced an earlier church from the days of the Carolingian dynasty, of which some cut stone slabs remained in secondary utilization. While the Counts of Gorizia, Ortenburg and Cilli held the office of a Vogt protector the monastic community included up to 150 brothers, who made Millstatt a cultural centre of Upper Carinthia and left a famous codex—the 'Millstatt Manuscript'—in Middle High German language from around 1200. The decline of the monastery in consequence of economic and disciplinary difficulties led to its abolition by Pope Paul II in 1469.

The Habsburg emperor Frederick III, by this time also Carinthian duke and Vogt of Millstatt, had urged on this decision for the sake of his foundation of the knightly order of St. George to which he handed over the monastery and its estates on 14 May 1469. The order left a Renaissance knightly palace south of the monastery finished in 1499. It was meant to serve as a protector against the increasing attacks by Ottoman forces, however, the very few knights did not succeed and the area was devastated by the Turks several times between 1473 and 1483. After the death of Emperor Maximilian I in 1519 the disbandment of the order began until its final abolition in 1598.

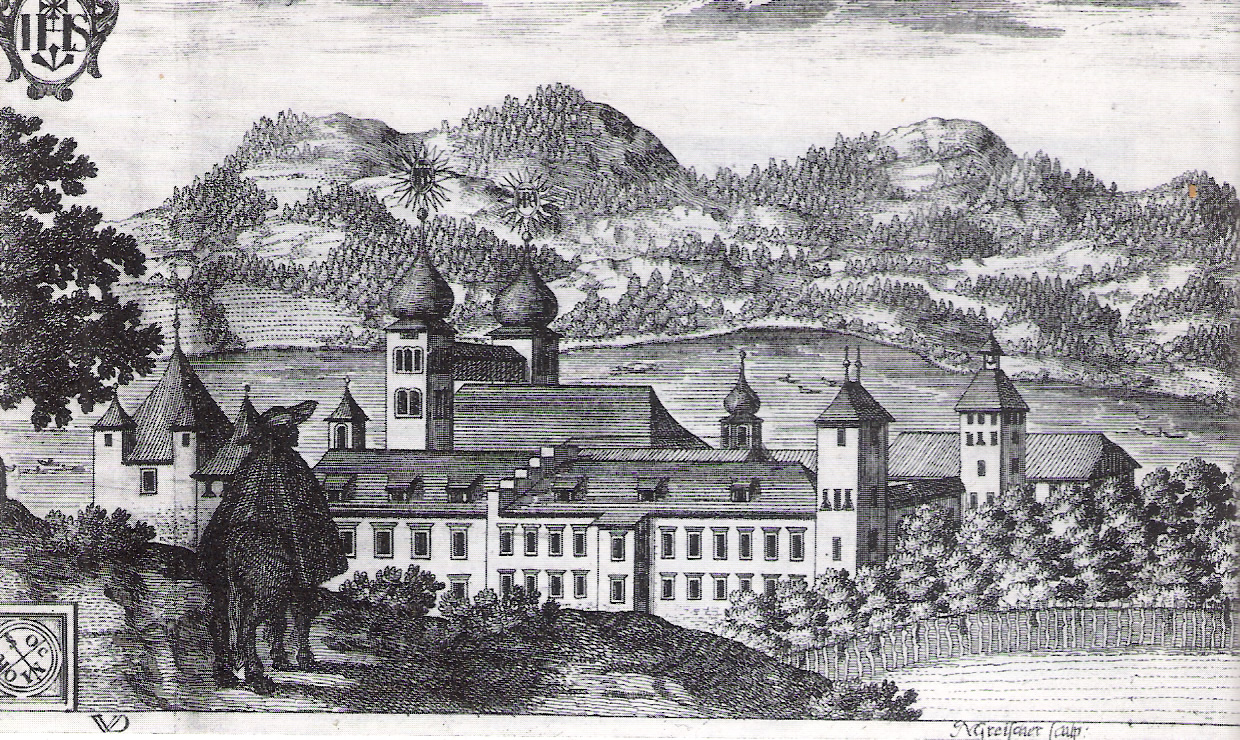
Millstatt Abbey, Johann Weikhard von Valvasor, 1688

Meanwhile, the Reformation had spread throughout Carinthia and the majority of the population had turned Protestant. The Habsburg archduke Ferdinand II, regent of Inner Austria and later Holy Roman Emperor intended to exterminate Protestantism in his hereditary lands and therefore furnished the Jesuit College at Graz with the benefit of the Millstatt monastery. From 1598 onwards the Jesuits pushed the Counter-Reformation by convincing as well as forcing the local inhabitants to return to the Catholic belief. The history of the monastery came to an end, when the Jesuit order was suppressed by Pope Clement XIV in 1773.

=== Recent history ===
After this date Millstatt fell into meaninglessness as monastic centre and the monastic buildings decayed. With Upper Carinthia it became part of the Napoleonic Illyrian Provinces according to the 1809 Treaty of Schönbrunn, but was restored to the Austrian Empire by resolution of the Vienna Congress in 1815. In 1825 the mountaineer Joseph Kyselak (1799–1831) passed the place and made a note of bedraggled houses and bygone splendour. From 1857 the Carinthian monument conservator Baron Gottlieb von Ankershofen (1795–1860) engaged himself to preserve the remaining art treasures.

The present-day municipality of Millstatt was established in the wake of the Revolutions of 1848 as one of the subsequently founded Carinthian municipalities. In 1888 Obermillstatt was split off as a separate community, but both parts of Millstatt merged again in 1973.

Millstatt was since the 1960s a destination of mass tourism (mostly from West Germany), but has recently evolved as destination of quality tourism and a hotspot of second homes/ vacation properties.

== Tourism ==
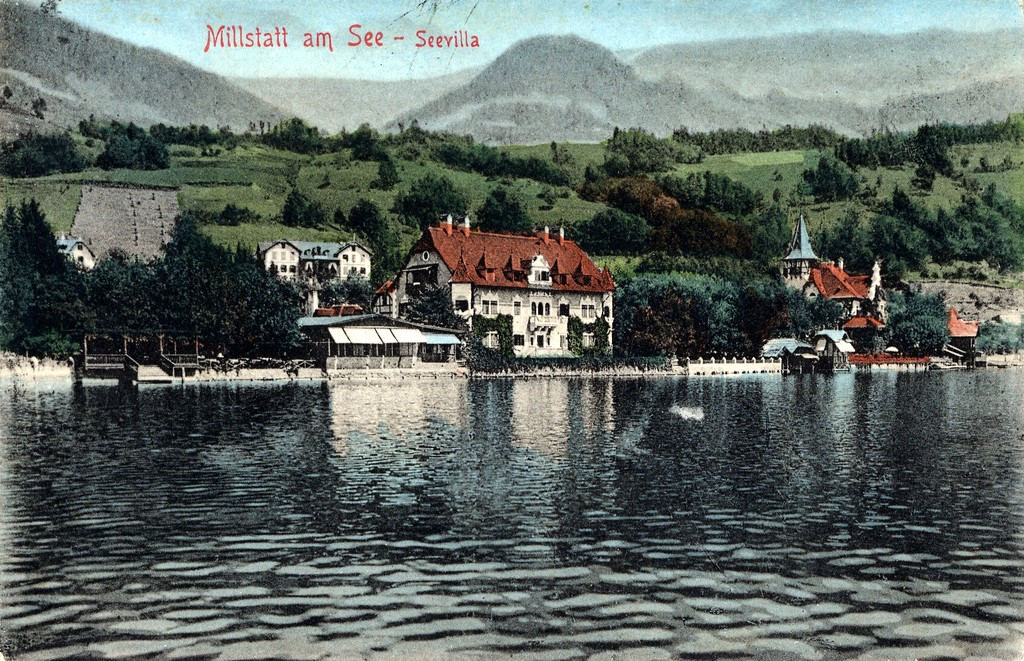
Villas by the lake, 1907

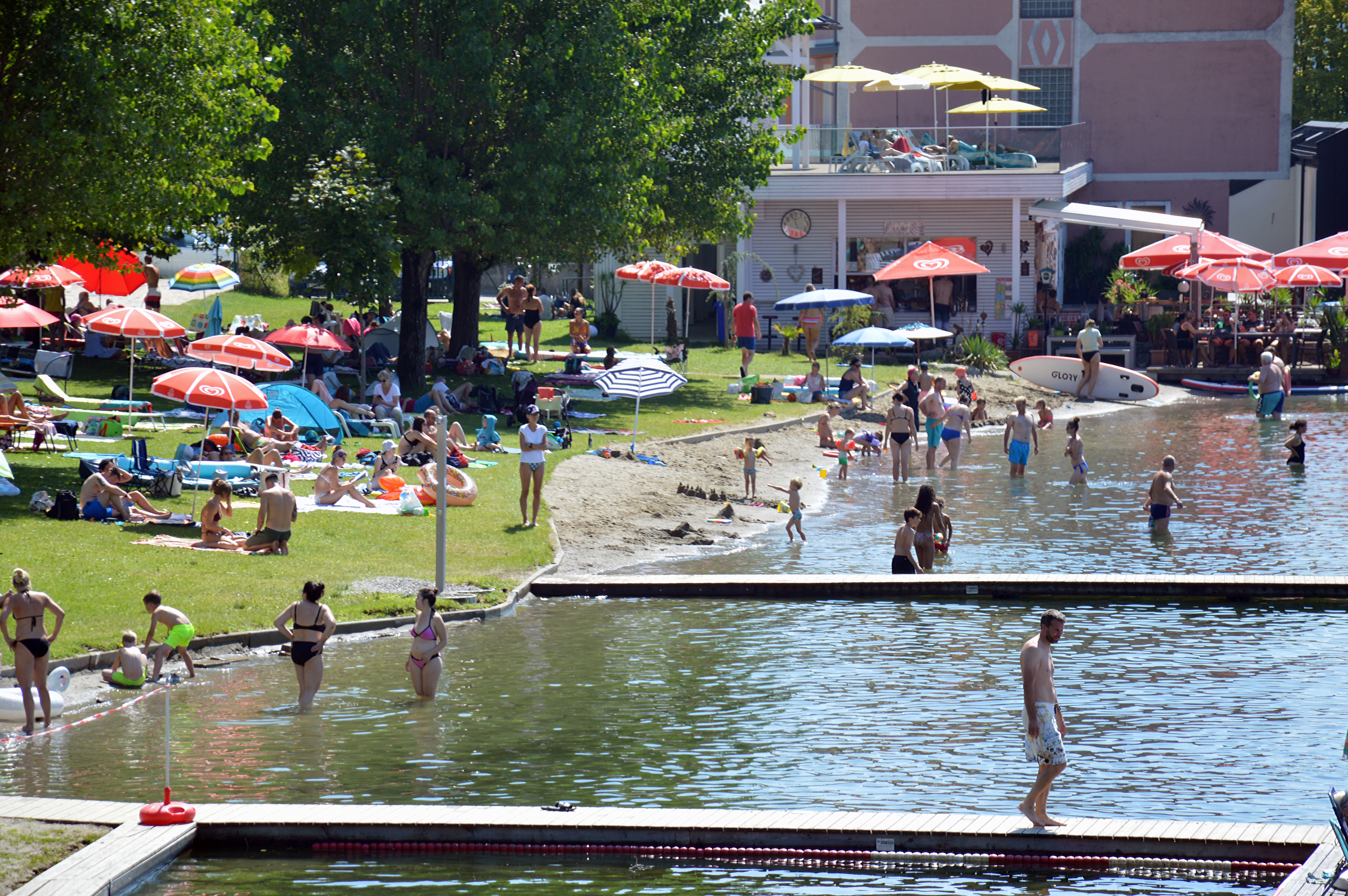
Swimmers and sunbathers at the Strandbad, 2023

A first guest from Vienna is documented in 1869, arriving by train at the Villach railway terminus and staying at the local inn. From about 1870 onwards Millstatt developed from a sedate village to a fashionable summer resort for the nobility and the wealthy bourgeoisie of the Austro-Hungarian Empire. It was in this year when wealthy publisher and son of an old Bohemian glass manufacturing dynasty, Rudolf Schürer von Waldheim, came to Millstatt to build the first hotel in town, the Hotel See-Villa according to plans designed by architect Karl Mayreder in 1883-84. The area gained direct access to the Austrian Southern Railway line by the opening of the branch-off to nearby Spittal-Millstättersee station in 1873, followed by the inauguration of the Tauern Railway line in 1909.

On 7 June 1885, Archduke Karl Ludwig of Austria, younger brother of Emperor Franz Joseph, visited the See-Villa and talked about it in highest tones; thus, increasing the popularity of the hotel and of Millstatt in general. During the Fin de siècle era of the 1880s and 90s numerous inns and hotels opened, while nobles and rich citizens had lavish holiday homes erected on the lakeside. The town's increasing economic dependence on tourism became obvious in the first recession during World War I, later Millstatt was badly hurt by the Great Depression of the late 1920s. The local authorities tried to encounter the narrow circumstances by obtaining spa town status in 1921, laying out a promenade and spa gardens, and the opening of the public lido with its prominent diving tower in 1931.

However, conditions worsened with economic sanctions applied by the German government on the First Austrian Republic from 1933. In addition, the political turmoil during the rise of Austrofascism and the transition to the Federal State of Austria erupted in violent fights, when during the 1934 July Putsch local Nazis attacked the Millstatt police station. Tourism was definitely disrupted in World War II, while several Kinderlandverschickung camps were established, mainly for children from Berlin.

After the war many villas were requisitioned by the British occupation forces. Nevertheless, in the 1950s and 60s, Millstatt became a popular destination of Wirtschaftswunder mass tourism, mainly from West Germany. The number of overnight stays in summer reached heady heights, largely affecting the biological diversity and ecology of the lake. The increasing eutrophication could be stemmed by sewage works, but also due to a declining number of guests, which has reached the climax around 1980. In recent years Millstatt has become the site of numerous vacation properties.

== Culture and arts ==
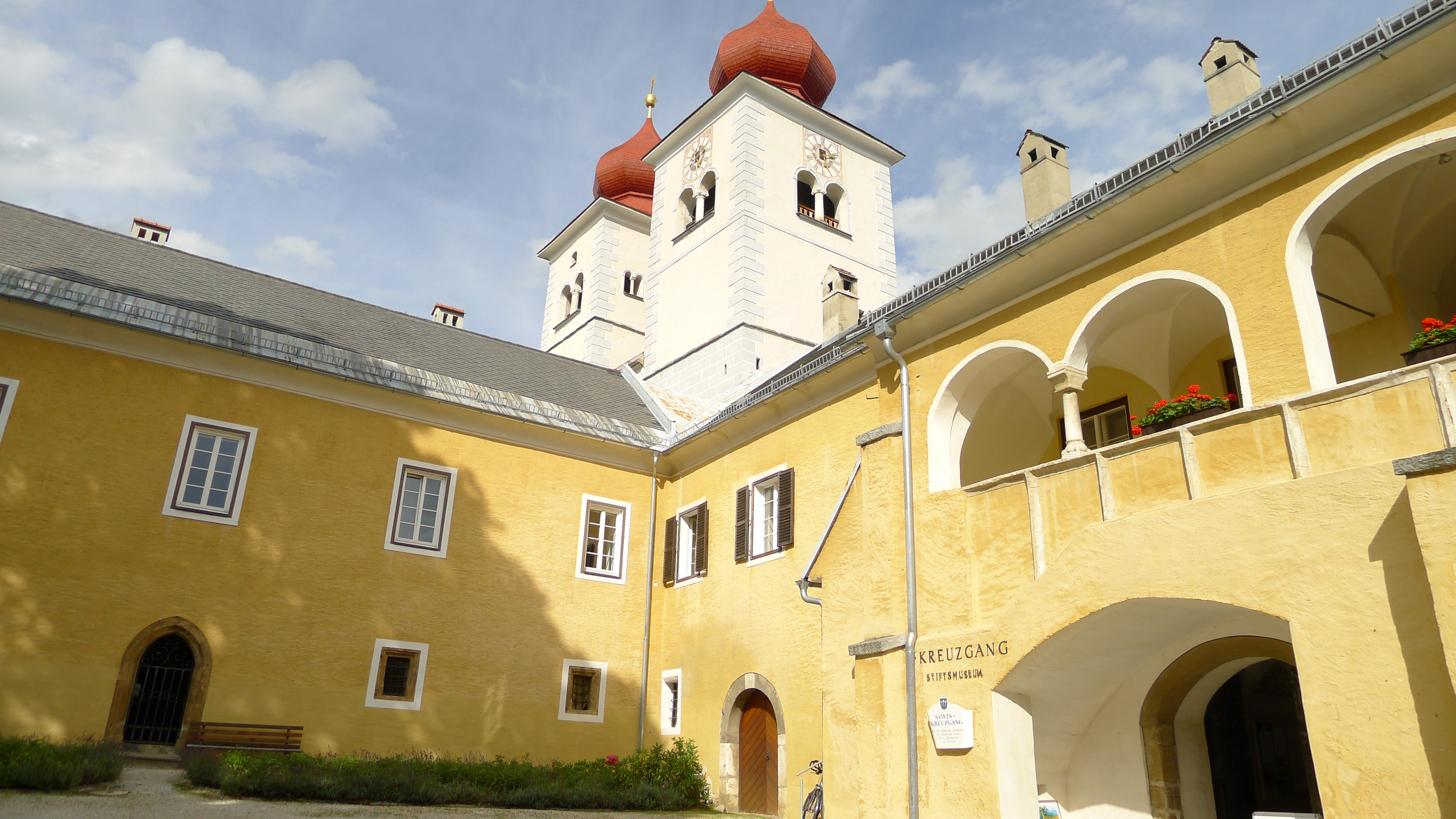
Abbey courtyard with museum

- The monastery museum is situated within the cloister and presents a summary of the abbey's history and its cultural heritage, e.g. Neolithic artifacts and facsimiles of the Millstatt manuscript. The collection also includes a Romanesque shrine from about 1140, a dungeon from the 16th century and a Renaissance chest from the studio of Andrea Mantegna. The cassone once was part of the dowry of Paola Gonzaga (1463–1497), the daughter of Marquis Ludovico III Gonzaga of Mantua and wife of Count Leonhard of Gorizia, who bequested it to the Order of St. George in 1495.
- Since 1981 the "Millstatt Symposium", an academic conference, takes place every year, where researchers discuss different subjects concerning the history of Millstatt and Carinthia.
- In summer the "Musikwochen Millstatt" (Millstatt Music Weeks) festival performs various concerts in and around the monastery church including sacred music, choral and classical works as well as jazz, chamber music, piano and organ recitals.
- In the monastery buildings there is also a center for Modern Art ("Artspace Millstatt"), emphasizing Visual Arts and Modern Dance.
- Since 2018 an art exhibition project called Art cycling in Millstatt ("KUNSTradln in Millstatt") can be experienced, with several exhibition stations all over Millstatt. It featured up to now (2020) approximately 130 renowned artists from Austria, Germany, USA, Poland, Switzerland or Guatemala, f.e. Brigitte Kowanz, Edith Kramer, Maria Lassnig, Hubert Sielecki, Josef Floch, Regina José Galindo, Oswald Oberhuber, Manfred Kielnhofer, or Maria Baumgartner. This project took place in the year 2020 for the third time.

== Politics ==
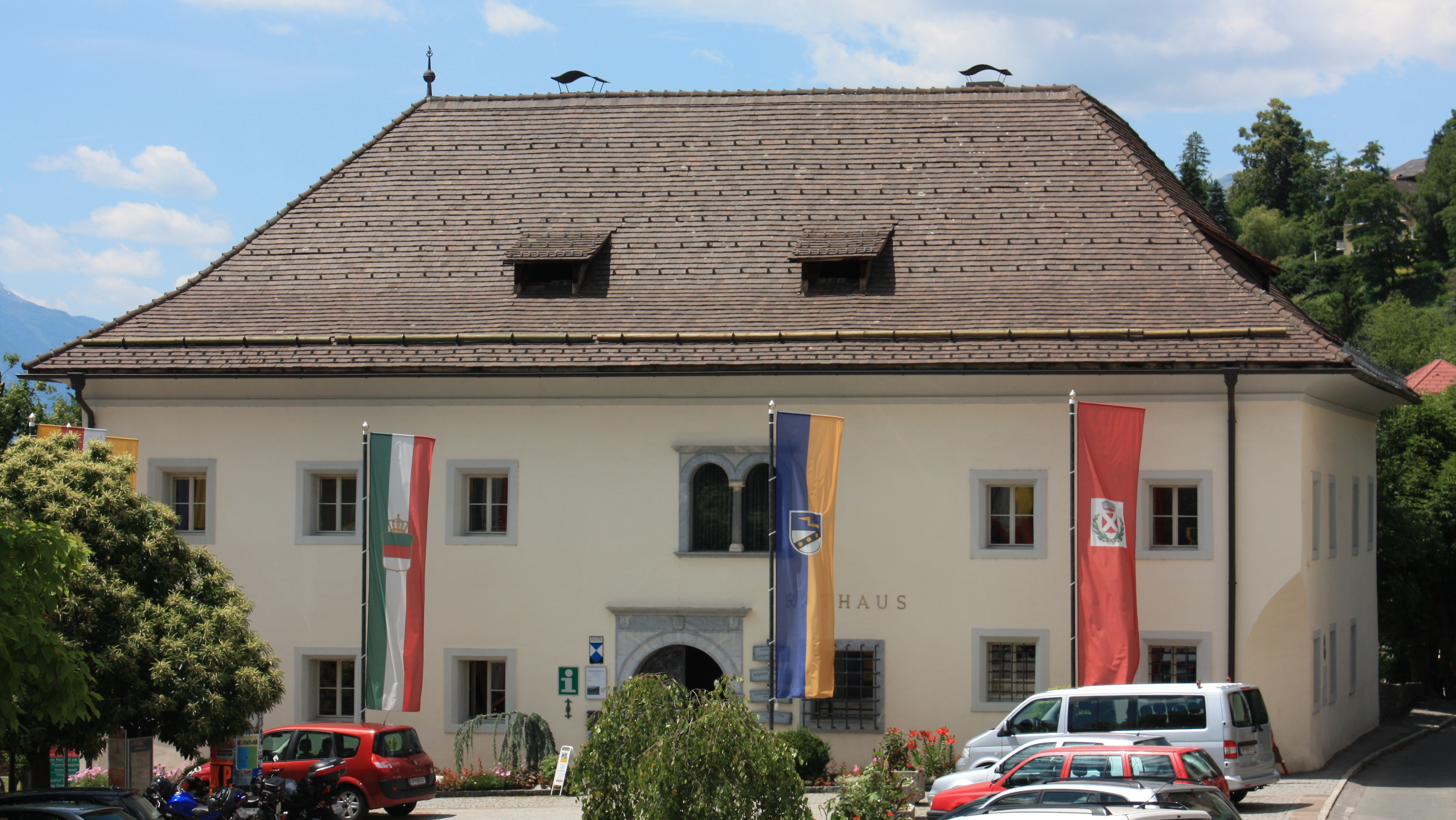
Town hall

The municipal council (Gemeinderat) consists of 23 members. Following the 2021 Carinthian Local Elections, the seat distribution is as follows:

- Austrian People's Party (ÖVP): 12 seats
- Social Democratic Party of Austria (SPÖ): 6 seats
- The Greens - The Green Alternative: 3 seats
- Freedom Party of Austria (FPÖ): 2 seats

The mayor of Millstatt am See, Alexander Thoma (ÖVP), was elected in 2021.

=== Twin towns and sister cities ===
Millstatt is twinned with:

- Helgoland, Germany, since 1974
- Wendlingen, Germany, since 1992
- San Daniele del Friuli, Italy, since 1993

== Notable people ==
- Felix von Luschan (1854–1924), anthropologist, is buried at the Millstatt churchyard.
- Anna Gasser (born 1991), snowboarder, two-time Olympic gold medalist in Big Air (2018 and 2022), resides in Millstatt

== Literature ==
- Matthias Maierbrugger, Die Geschichte von Millstatt, Klagenfurt, 1964. (in German)
