= Millstatt Abbey =

Coordinates: 46°48′15″N 13°34′15″E

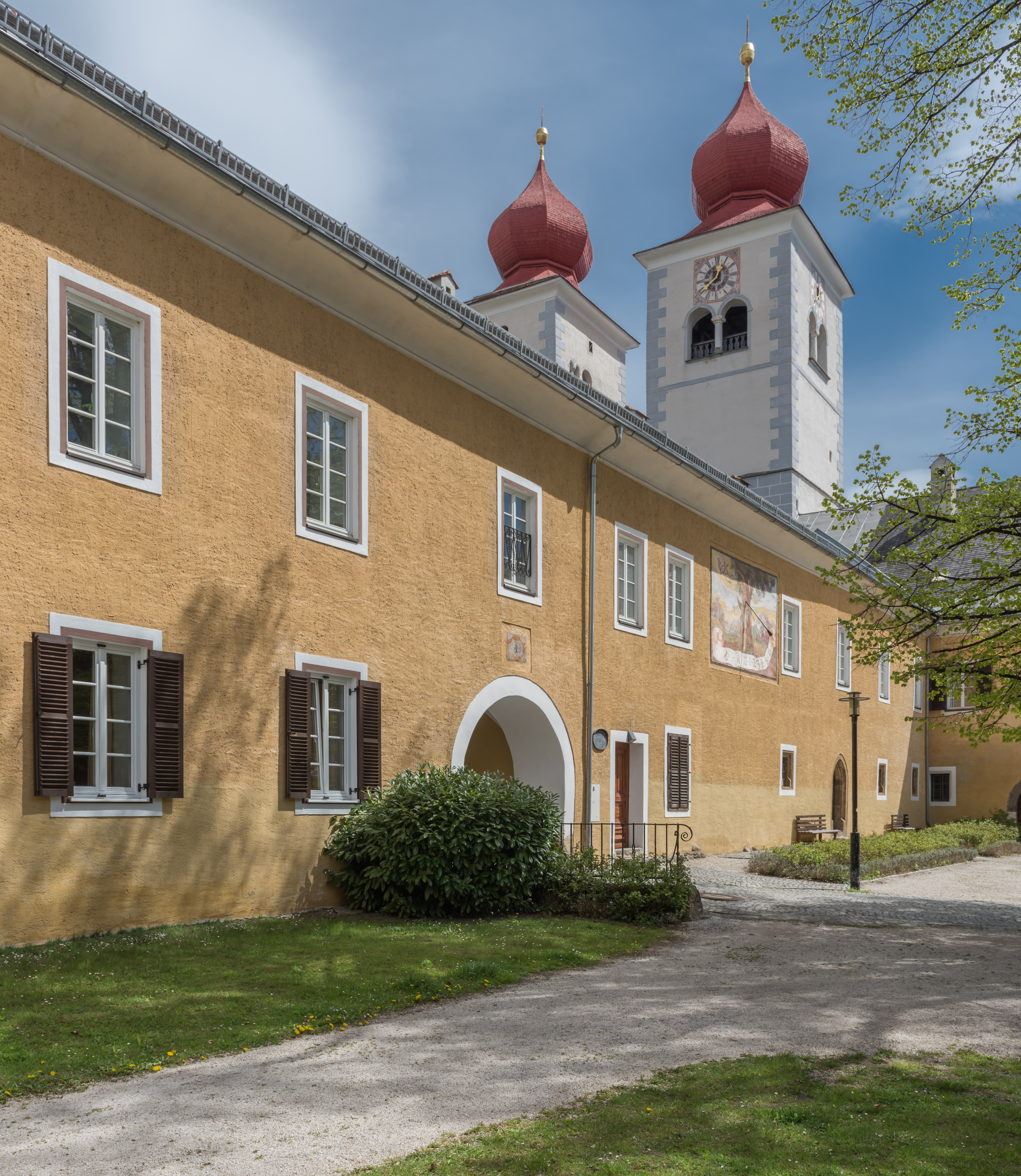
Millstatt Abbey, courtyard and church

Millstatt Abbey (German: Stift Millstatt) is a former monastery in Millstatt, Austria. Established by Benedictine monks about 1070, it ranks among the most important Romanesque buildings in the state of Carinthia. The Benedictines were succeeded by the knightly Order of Saint George in 1469 and the Society of Jesus (Jesuits, SJ) in 1598.

Until its dissolution in 1773 under Emperor Joseph II, Millstatt Abbey for centuries was the spiritual and cultural centre of Upper Carinthia and with its possessions around Millstätter See, in the Gurk Valley (Brückl) as well as in the former March of Friuli and in the Archbishopric of Salzburg (Pinzgau), one of the largest in the region.

== History ==
Millstatt Abbey was founded as a proprietary monastery by the Chiemgau count Aribo II (1024–1102), a scion of the Aribonid dynasty and former count palatine of Bavaria, and his brother Poto, on their estates in the newly established Duchy of Carinthia. Though no charter is preserved, a later chronicle mentions a tithe agreement from about 1070 between Aribo, who then held two churches at Millstatt, and Archbishop Gebhard of Salzburg. As Bishop Gebhard was exiled by King Henry IV during the Investiture Controversy in 1077, it is presumed that the foundation took place in the time period before.

Both Aribo and Poto were mentioned as founders (fundator huius ecclesie) in a 13th-century parish register. Though the foundation legend of a Carantanian duke Domitian has not been conclusively established (see below), a church may have already existed at the site since the days of Charlemagne. The monastery had definitely been established before 1122, when it was mentioned in a deed issued by Pope Callixtus II.

=== Order of Saint Benedict ===
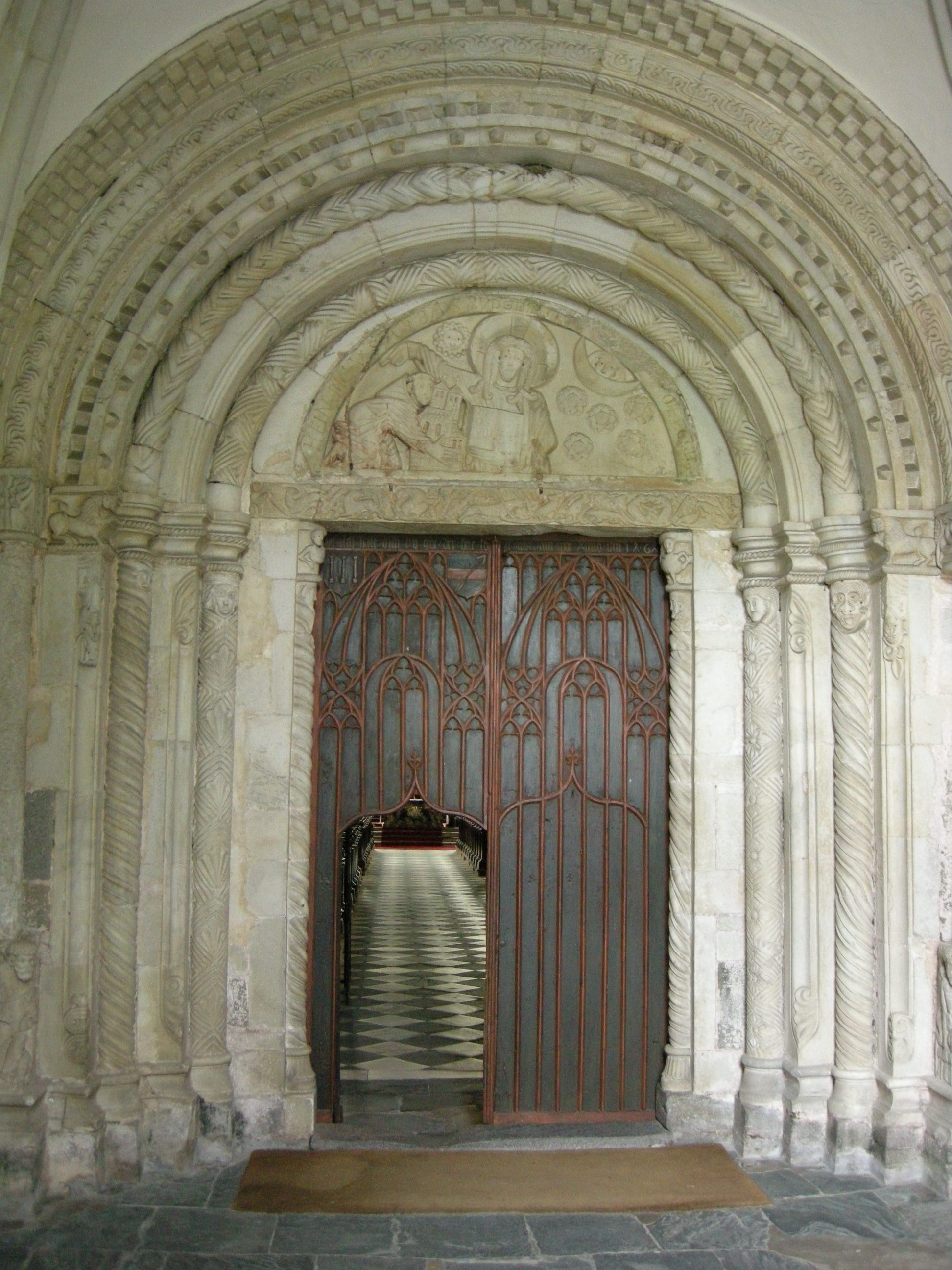
Romanesque church portal, c. 1170

By at least the 12th century Millstatt Abbey had been established by Benedictine monks, who may have descended from Hirsau Abbey in Swabia, led by one Gaudentius. However, the first verified abbot from around 1122, Otto I, was a former prior of Stift Admont in Styria, an abbey which had also been established by Archbishop Gebhard of Salzburg. At the same time, Count palatine Engelbert, a scion of the House of Gorizia and brother of Count Meinhard I, shortly before his death put the monastery under the protection of Pope Callixtus II. His descendants from the Meinhardiner dynasty, Counts of Tyrol from 1253 and also Dukes of Carinthia from 1286, held the office of secular Vogt overlords until the extinction of the line in 1369.

The abbey prospered during its early years, enjoying special papal protection, again confirmed by Pope Alexander III in an 1177 deed; it was however never officially exempt and remained under the overlordship of the Archbishops of Salzburg. The premises included an adjacent nunnery and a well-known scriptorium, where the Benedictine monks left numerous manuscripts, though the most famous Middle High German Millstätter Handschrift (Millstatt Manuscript) probably did not originate here. The abbey even included a nunnery, which was dissolved in the 15th century. In 1245 the abbot of Millstatt even received the pontifical vestments from the Salzburg Archbishop.

At the same time however, the long decay of the Benedictine monastery began, enhanced through the Great Interregnum in the Holy Roman Empire after the ban of the last Hohenstaufen Emperor Frederick II and the struggles of the Meinhardiner with the rising Habsburgs, who finally were vested with Carinthia upon the death of Duke Henry VI in 1335. From the Meinhardiner, the Vogt office passed to the Counts of Ortenburg, it was inherited by Count Hermann II of Celje in 1418. When his grandson Count Ulrich II of Celje was killed in 1456, all his possessions and titles including the Vogtei of Millstatt finally were seized as reverted fiefs by Emperor Frederick III from the House of Habsburg.

=== Knights of Saint George ===
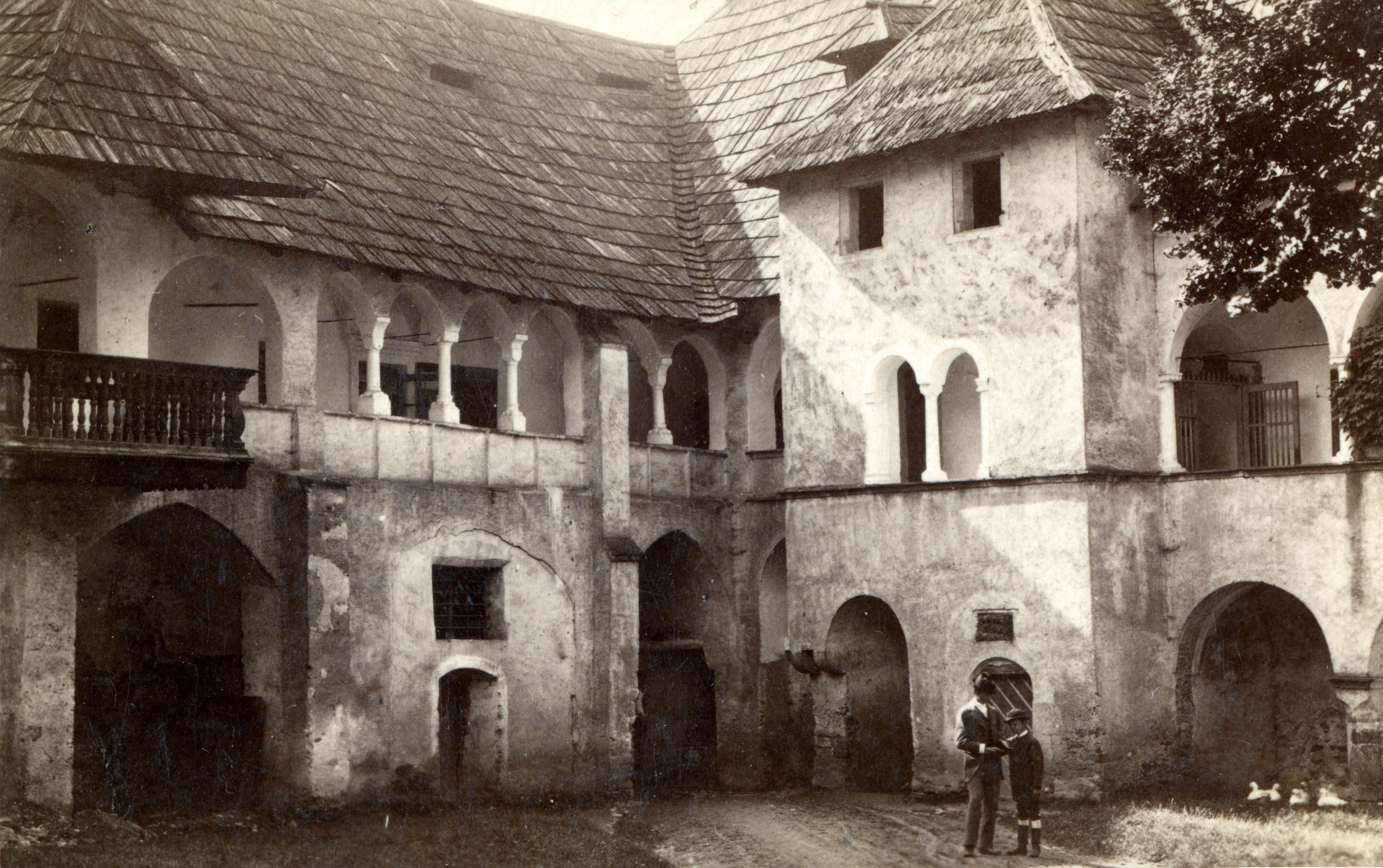
Order's Castle courtyard, around 1890

At this time the monastic community comprised only about ten monks; Emperor Frederick found the morals degenerated, the buildings decayed and the abbot inept. He travelled to Rome and on 1 January 1469 reached a papal bull by Pope Paul II, whereby he established the military order of the Knights of Saint George in order to fight the invading troops of the Ottoman Empire. Against the protest by the Salzburg Archbishop, the order was vested with the buildings and assets of Millstatt Abbey, while the Benedictine monastery was disestablished with the handover ceremony of May 14.

The grand master however commanded only few knights, who had to cope with the enormous debts left by the Benedictines and the redevelopment of the neglected premises. The order was therefore fully engaged with the fortification of the monastery, while they failed to protect the region: Millstatt was heavily devastated by the Turks on their 1478 campaign, followed by the Hungarian troops of Emperor Frederick's long-time rival Matthias Corvinus in 1487. Frederick's son Maximilian I, the "Last Knight", again was a promoter of the order; however, the time for the mediaeval chivalric institution was up. The power of the order declined, leading to unrest among the surrounding peasants, revolts, and the spread of the new Protestant belief. The last grand master did not reside at Millstatt, and from 1541 onwards the estates were under the rule of Inner Austrian administrators and given in pawn several times.

=== Society of Jesus ===
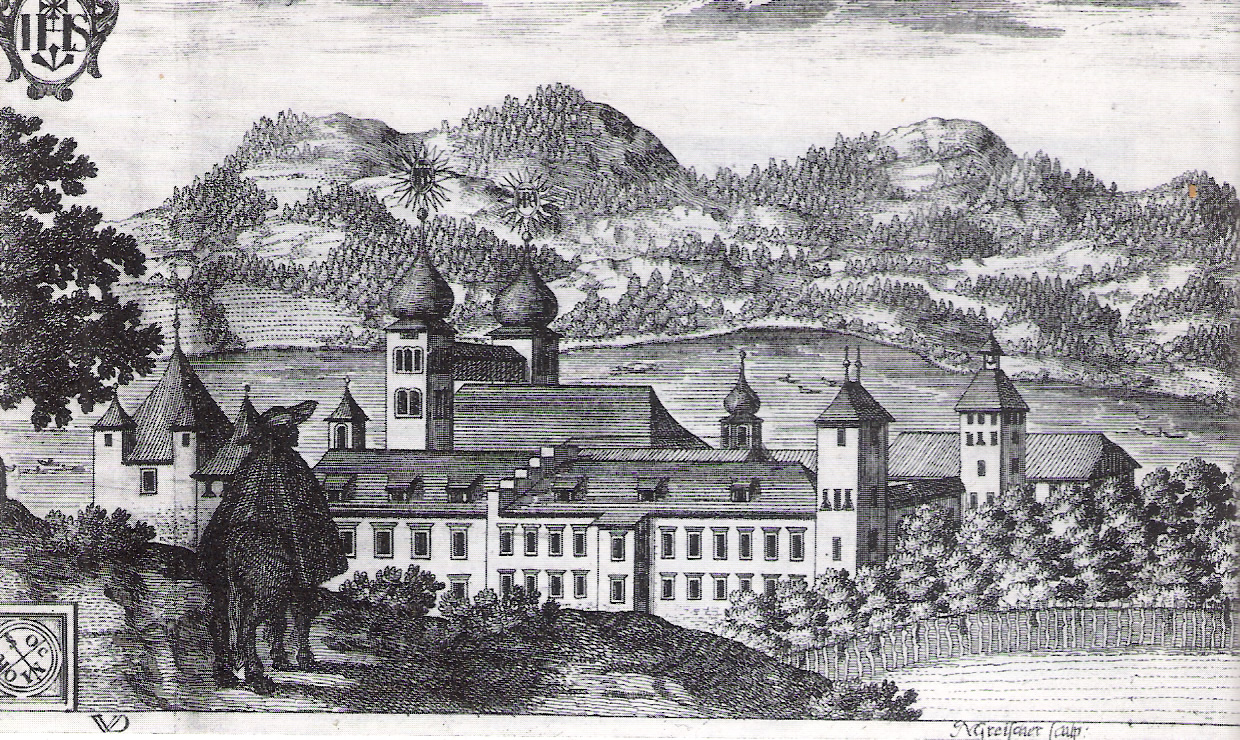
Stift Millstatt, engraving by Johann Weikhard von Valvasor, 1688

In 1598 the Inner Austrian archduke Ferdinand II, a devout Catholic, vested the Society of Jesus at Graz with Millstatt. In the course of the Counter-Reformation, the Jesuits had established a college at the Styrian capital (the present-day University of Graz), that was to be financed with the income of the Millstatt estates.

The Jesuits soon became disliked by the local population for their stern measures to lead the subjects back to true faith and, even more, for their unyielding enforcement of public charges. In 1737 the displeasure culminated in open revolt, when numerous peasants ganged up and stormed the monastery. Despite all efforts, Lutheranism had deep roots, mainly in the surrounding estates held by the Khevenhüller noble family. Still in the 1750s, under the rule of Empress Maria Theresa, several Protestant peasants were exiled and deported to Transylvania. Remote valleys of the region remained centres of Crypto-protestantism.

The rule of the Jesuits came to a sudden end when the order was suppressed by Pope Clement XIV in 1773, and the Millstatt convent was dissolved under Emperor Joseph II. The Jesuits had to leave the monastery and their estates passed to the public administration of the Habsburg monarchy.

== Domitian legend ==
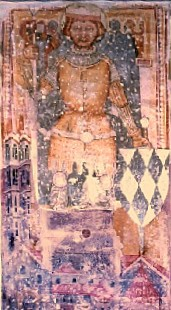
1429 fresco depicting Domitian, Millstatt church

According to a tradition given by the Benedictine monks which was already documented in the late 12th century, the monastery church traces back to the (second) Christianization about 780, when the area was ruled by of one Slavic prince Domitian (Domicijan). Legend has it, that Domitian's son drowned in a storm on Millstätter See, whereafter his mourning father had himself baptized and ordered the first church to be built at Millstatt where the dead body was found. Similar to Saint Boniface's felling of Donar's Oak, he threw a thousand graven statues – mille statuæ – from a pagan temple into the lake in holy wrath. Modelled on the Pantheon in Rome, rebuilt under Emperor Domitian, the temple is alleged to have been converted by the prince into a church dedicated to All Saints.

Indeed, present-day Carinthia was part of the early mediæval principality of Carantania, which comprised Slavic tribes settling the Eastern Alps from the late 6th century onwards. However, a ruler named Domitian is not mentioned in contemporary chronicles like the Conversio Bagoariorum et Carantanorum and his life had been named a fake by historians like Robert Eisler. On the other hand, several artifacts found in and around the monastery dating back to the Carolingian period indicate that a church already existed at Millstatt in the late 8th century, after the Slavs living in the region around the former Roman city of Teurnia had been Christianized by Chorbishop Modestus sent by Bishop Vergilius of Salzburg.

The truth content remains disputed; in any case the legend was useful for the Millstatt monks to emancipate themselves from the Aribonid founders of the abbey and their Meinhardiner successors. Centuries later the Jesuits strongly referred to the myth in order to strengthen the popular devotion in the course of the Counter-Reformation. They however failed to have Domitian canonized by the Holy See. In Millstatt his feast day is still celebrated on February 5.

== Buildings ==
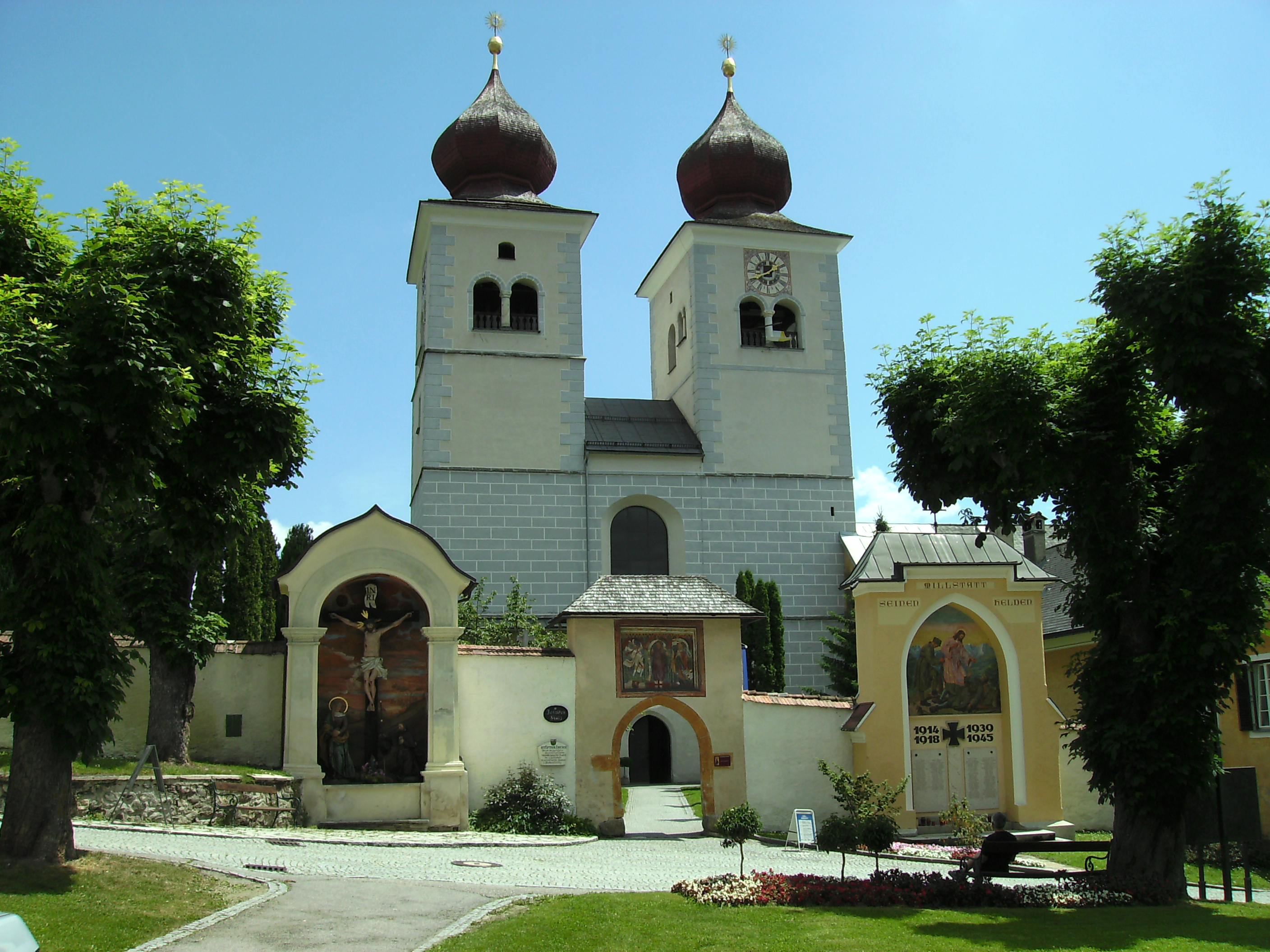
Millstatt abbey church

Since 1977 the church is a property of the local parish of the Gurk diocese, while most other buildings of the former abbey belong to the Austrian state and are administrated by the Austrian State Forestry Commission.

=== Church / basilica ===
The monastery church, now parish church of Christ the Savior and All Saints, was erected in the second quarter of the 12th century. It replaced an earlier church from the days of the Carolingian dynasty, of which some cut stone slabs remained in secondary utilization. The westwork with the characteristic twin steeples was attached between 1166 and 1177, the Baroque onion domes about 1670. Underneath the towers the entrance hall has a Romanesque rib vault and a fresco from 1428 showing the Passion of Christ.

Seven arches form the Romanesque portal from about 1170 with a manifold figurative decoration. The nave itself is a Romanesque basilica, while on several piers are frescoes from about 1430 and the Gothic apse as well as the lierne vault with 149 coats of arms dating from 1516. The Baroque high altar was manufactured under the Jesuits in 1648. On the wall to the right is now a large fresco of the Last Judgement from about 1515, which had to be removed from its original place on the outside wall of the westwork. Two chapels at the north and at the south side with the tombstones of the first two Grand Masters of the order of Knights of Saint George were added between 1490 and 1505.

The church is now used not only for parochial purposes, but also for concerts within the program of the international festival Millstatt Music Weeks (Musikwochen Millstatt), giving it the public building ("basilica") status.

=== Cloister and monastery buildings ===
In the Romanesque cloistered courtyard south of the church the capitals of some columns date back to the 12th century. It was furnished with a Late Gothic groin vault and frescoes of the Madonna about 1500. Further Renaissance monastery buildings with their arcades are situated to the west and the south of the courtyard.

Here nowadays the Millstatt monastery museum is located, as well as the spacious chapter house, which is presently used for art exhibitions, art workshops and dance events by the association ART SPACE Millstatt.

=== Additional buildings and objects ===
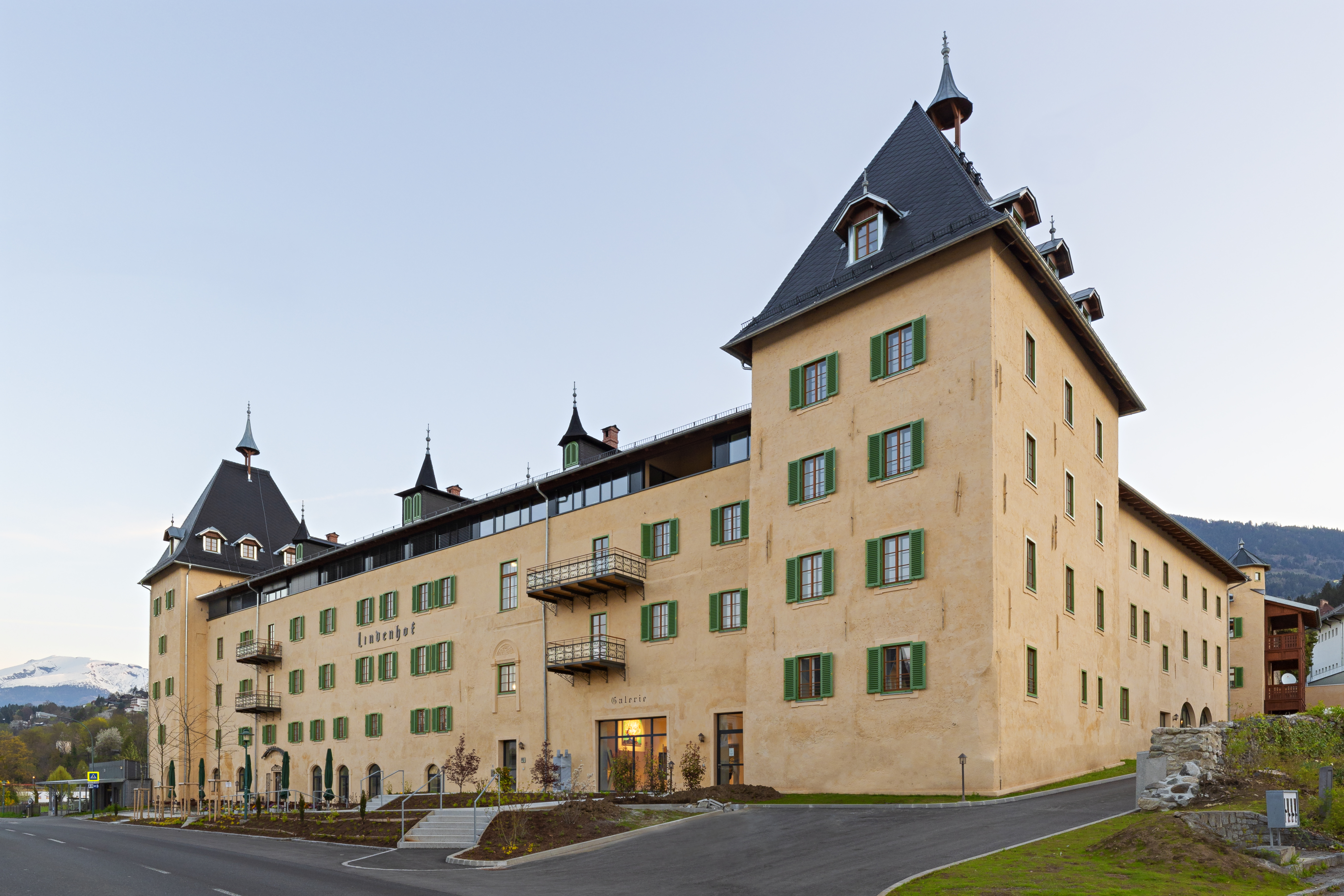
Renovated building of the new "Lindenhof"

- The adjacent former castle of the Grand Master of the Knights of Saint George is also a Renaissance building with Romanesque fundaments and elements. The south part of this castle was converted in 1901 into the Grand Hotel Lindenhof (and used as hotel until 1970). Recently (2018) the whole complex of the castle including the northern part (now called "Lindenhof Millstatt") was transformed into a combination of apartments, offices, a restaurant and an art gallery, the "Lindenhof Galerie".
- The old primary school of Millstatt, a baroque building within the monastery area, was restored recently and is now used as gallery and art studio by the association "Art & Co. Millstatt".
- The former monastery garden and the baroque theatre hall are now used as art studio and exhibition space by local artists.
- From the abbey leads a Way of the Cross up to the Baroque chapel of Calvary hill, a heritage of the Jesuits as well as, in the east of the town, the High Cross monument from the 18th century.

=== Property of the buildings ===
Since 1977 the church is a property of the local parish of the Gurk diocese, while most other buildings of the former abbey belong to the Austrian state and are administrated by the Austrian State Forestry Commission (Österreichische Bundesforste).

== Gallery ==
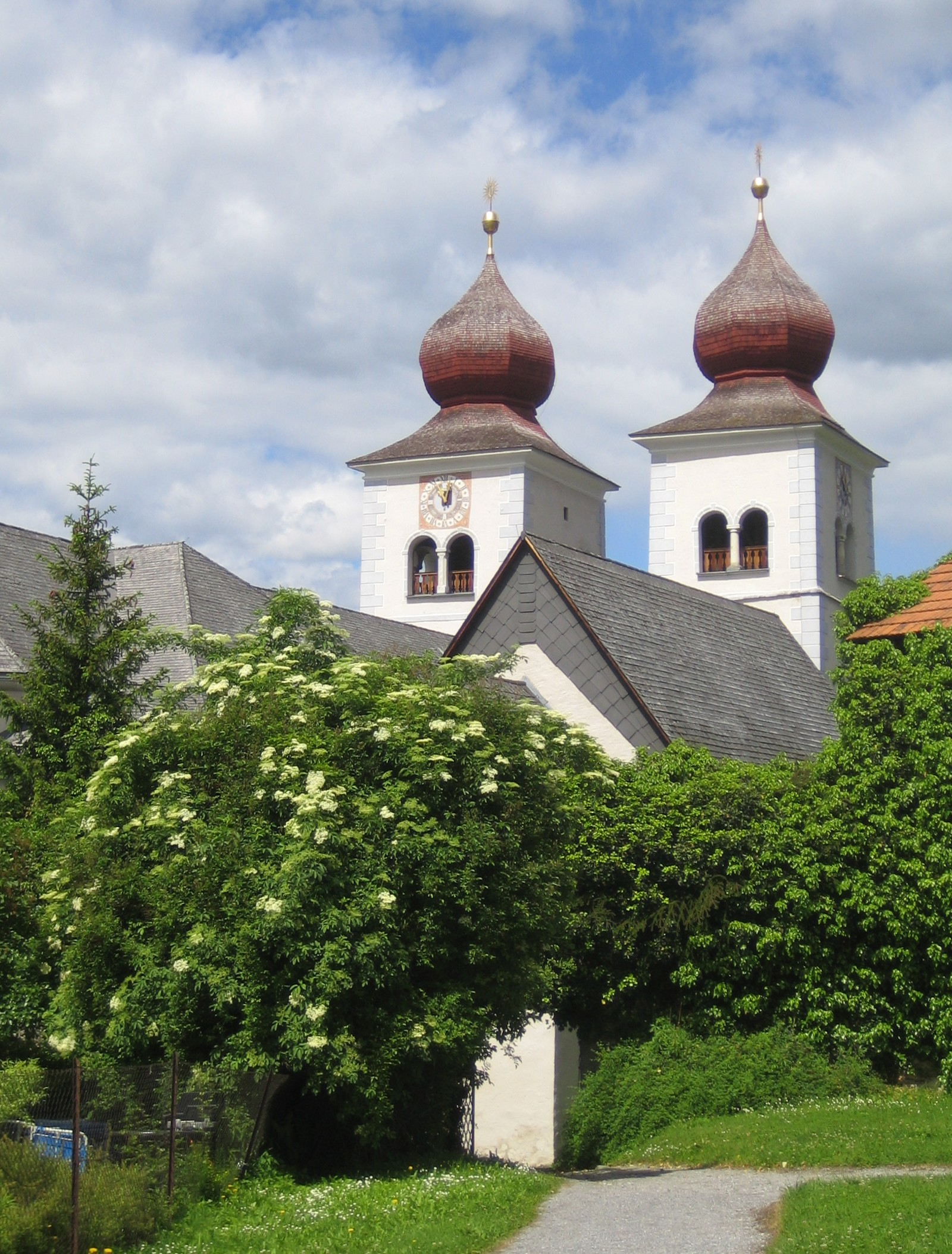
Millstatt abbey church from the northeast

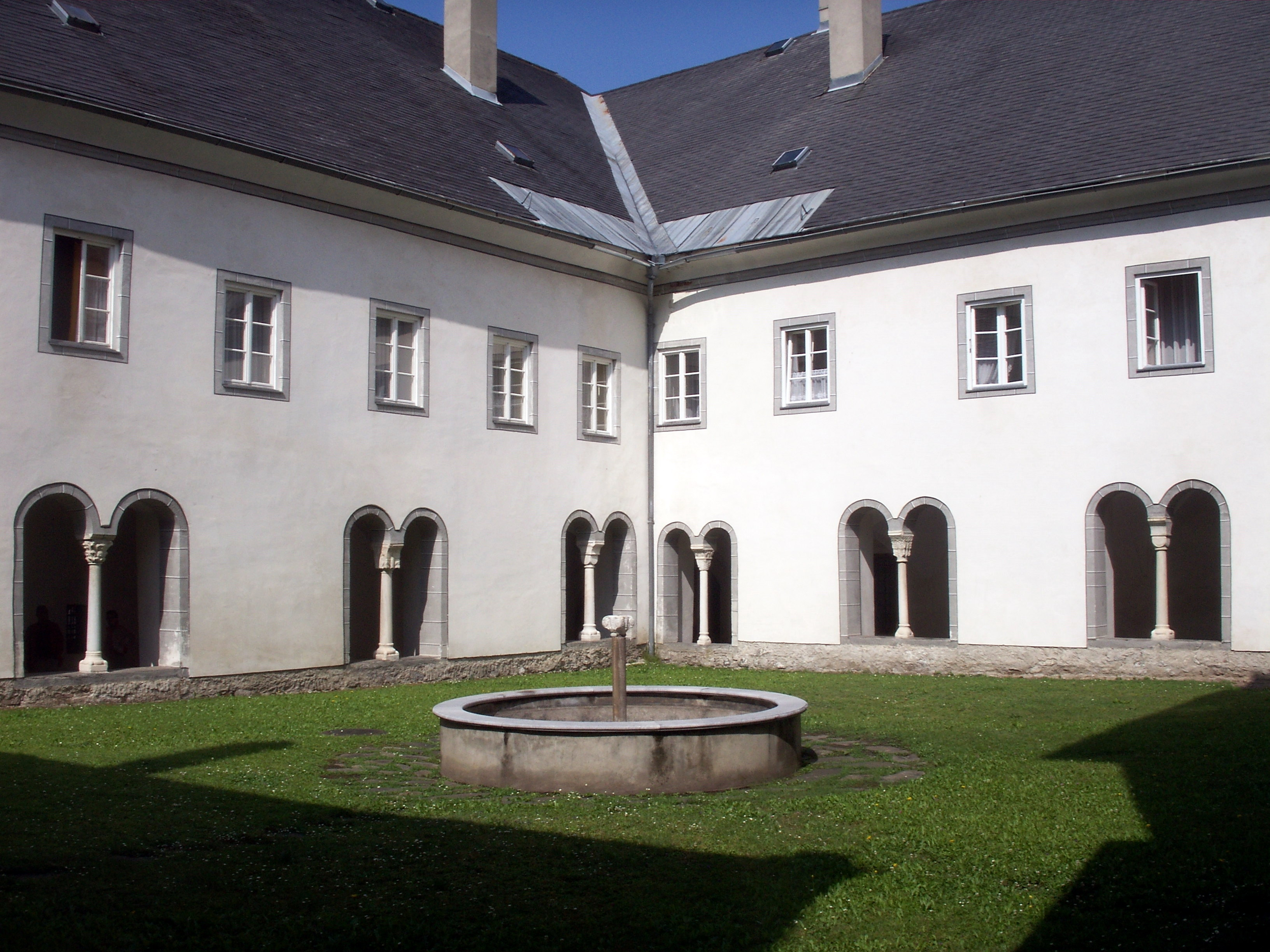
Romanesque cloister courtyard

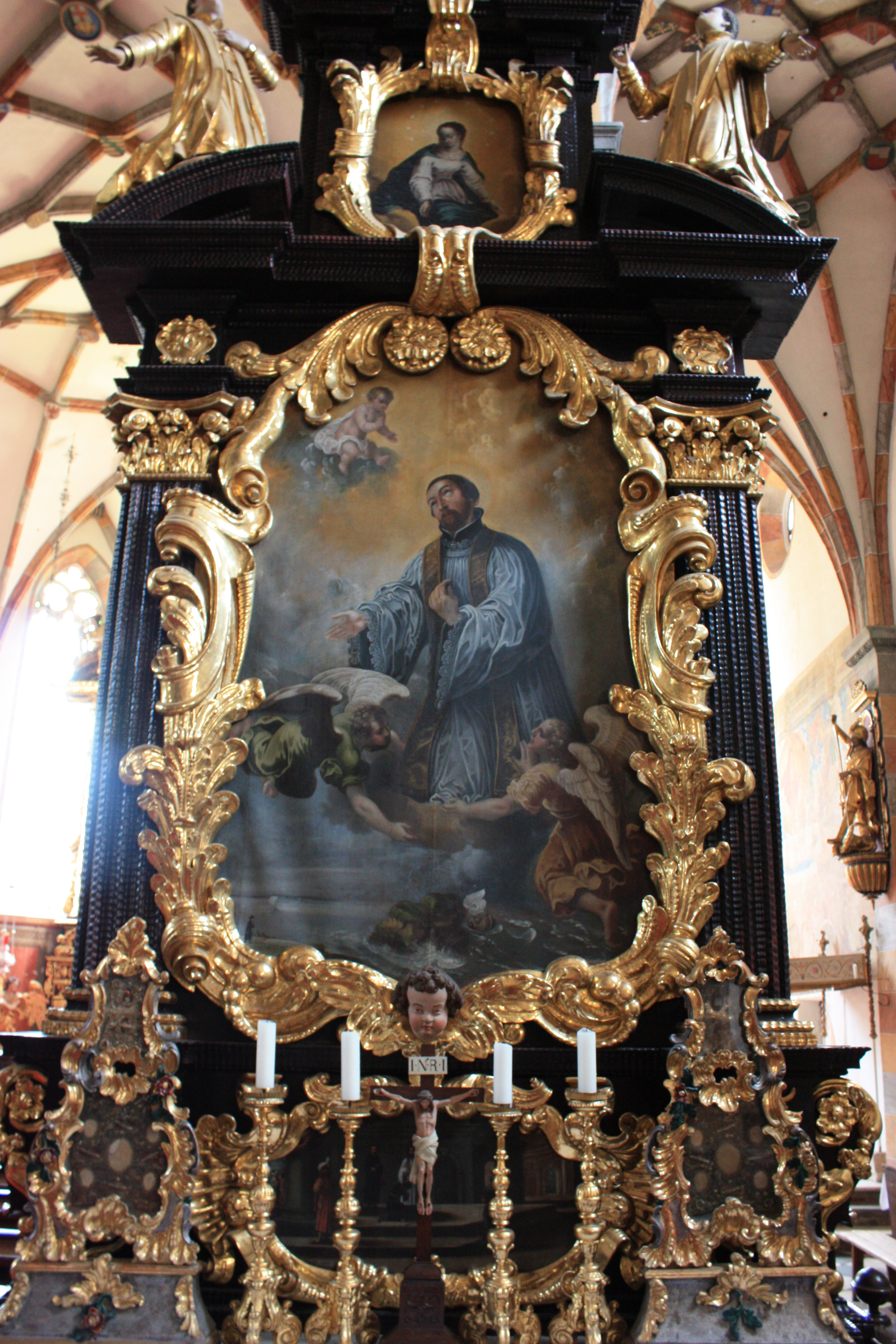
Cloister church

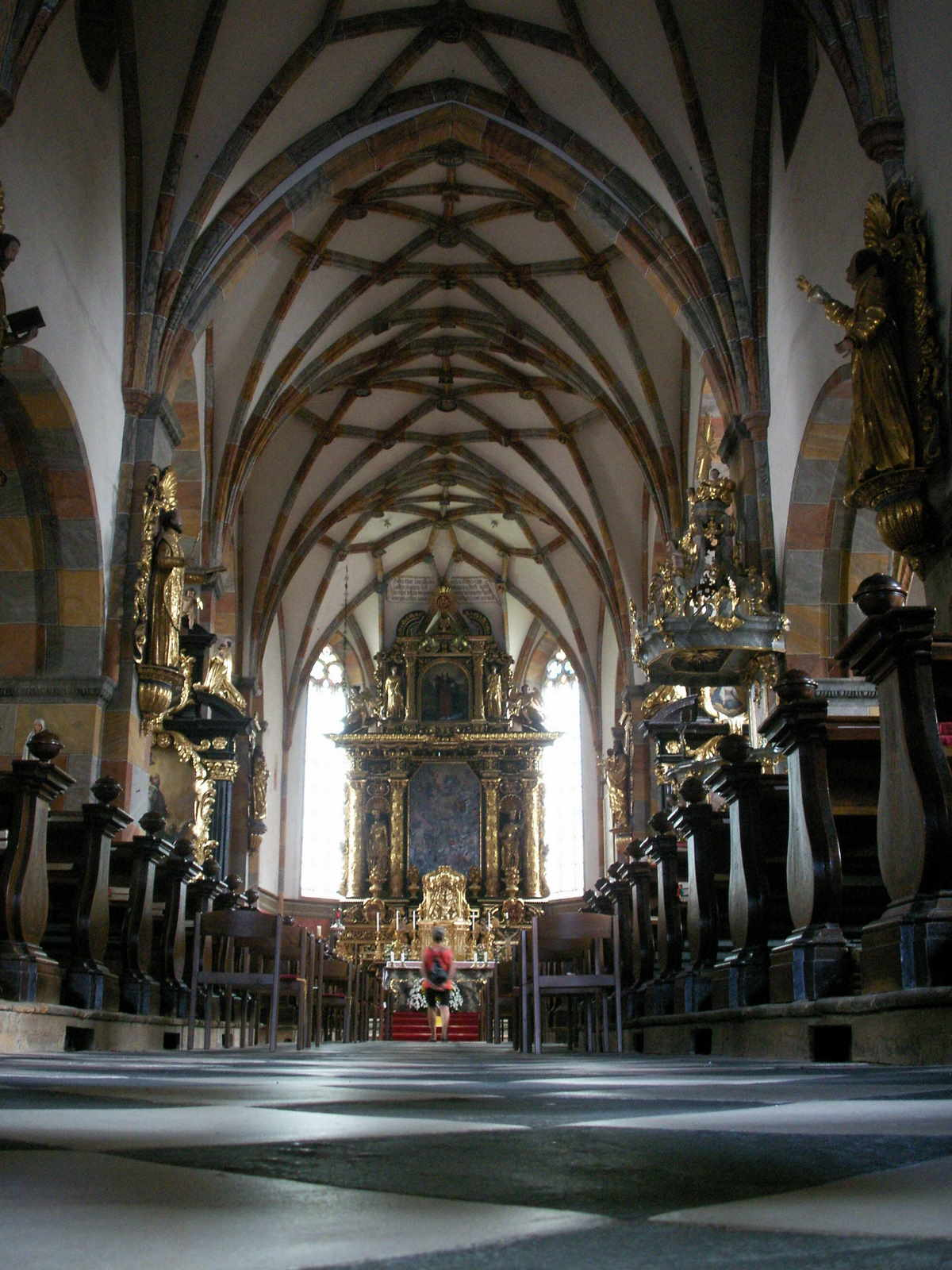
Cloister church

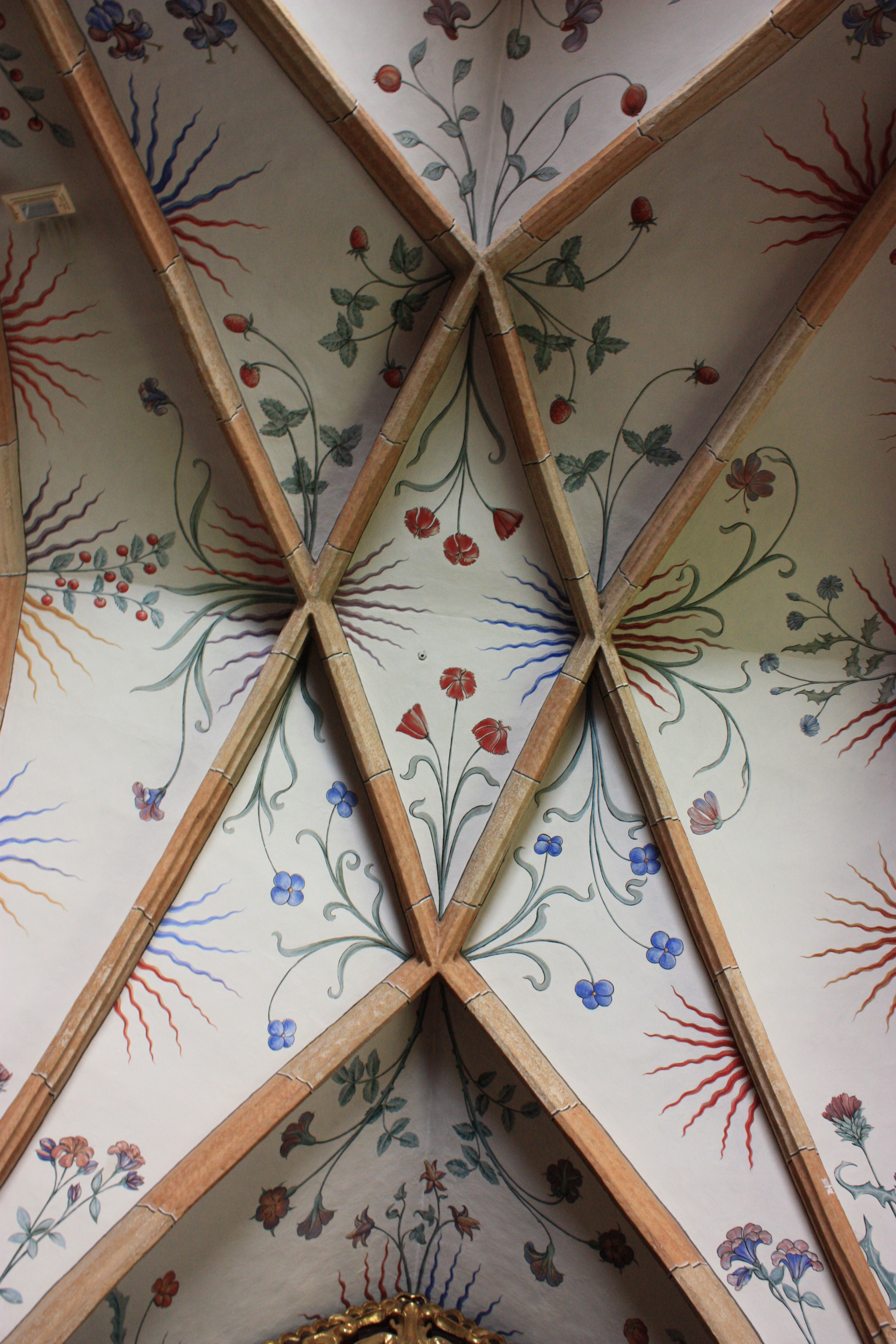
Cloister church vault

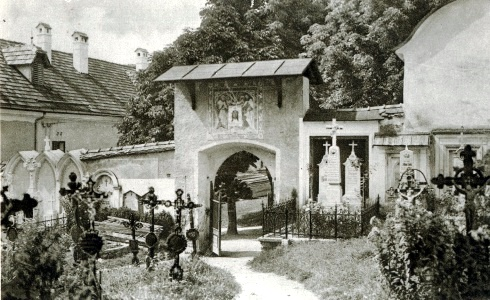
Graveyard entrance, c. 1914

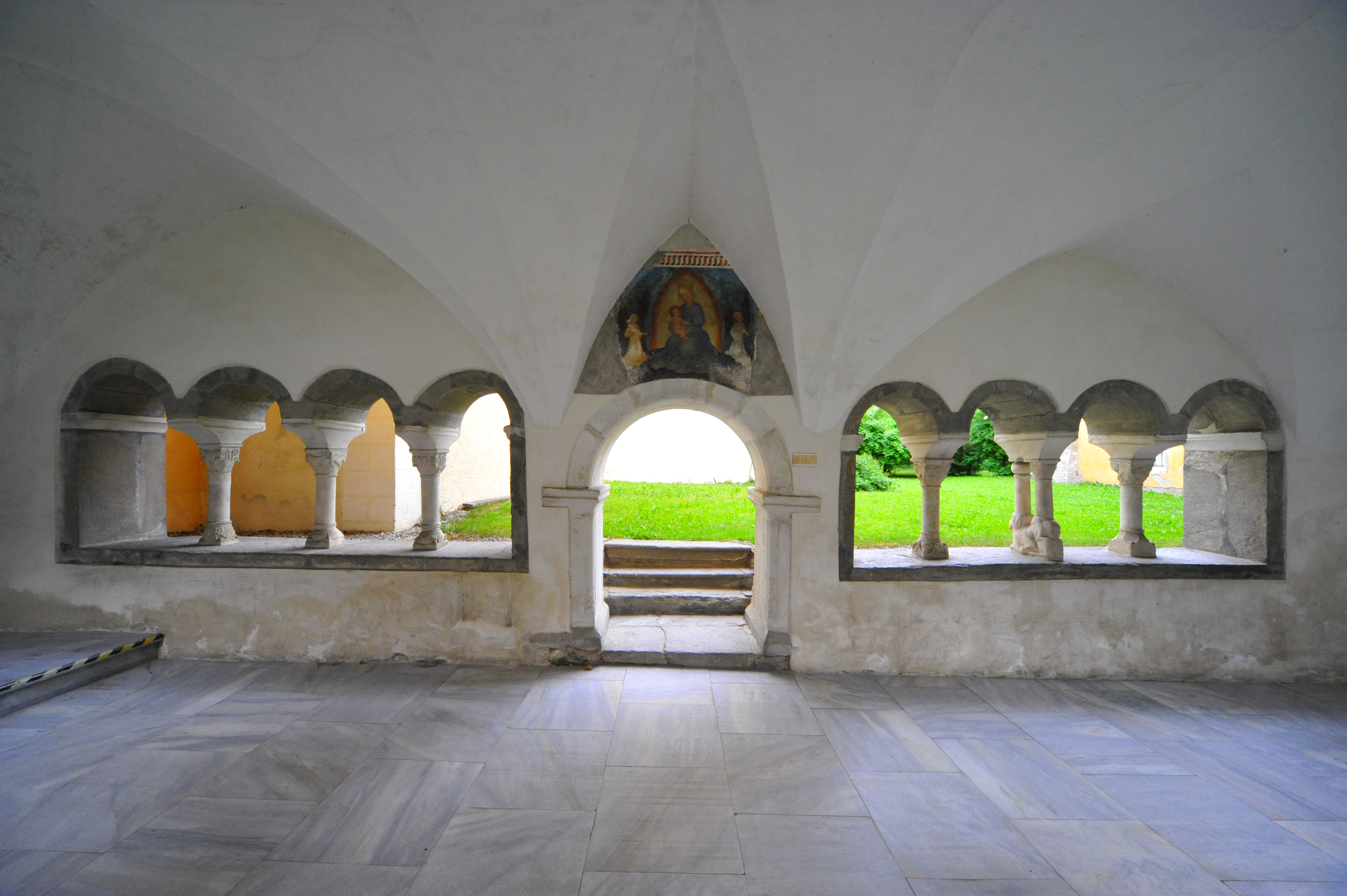
Romanesque cloister southern arcades

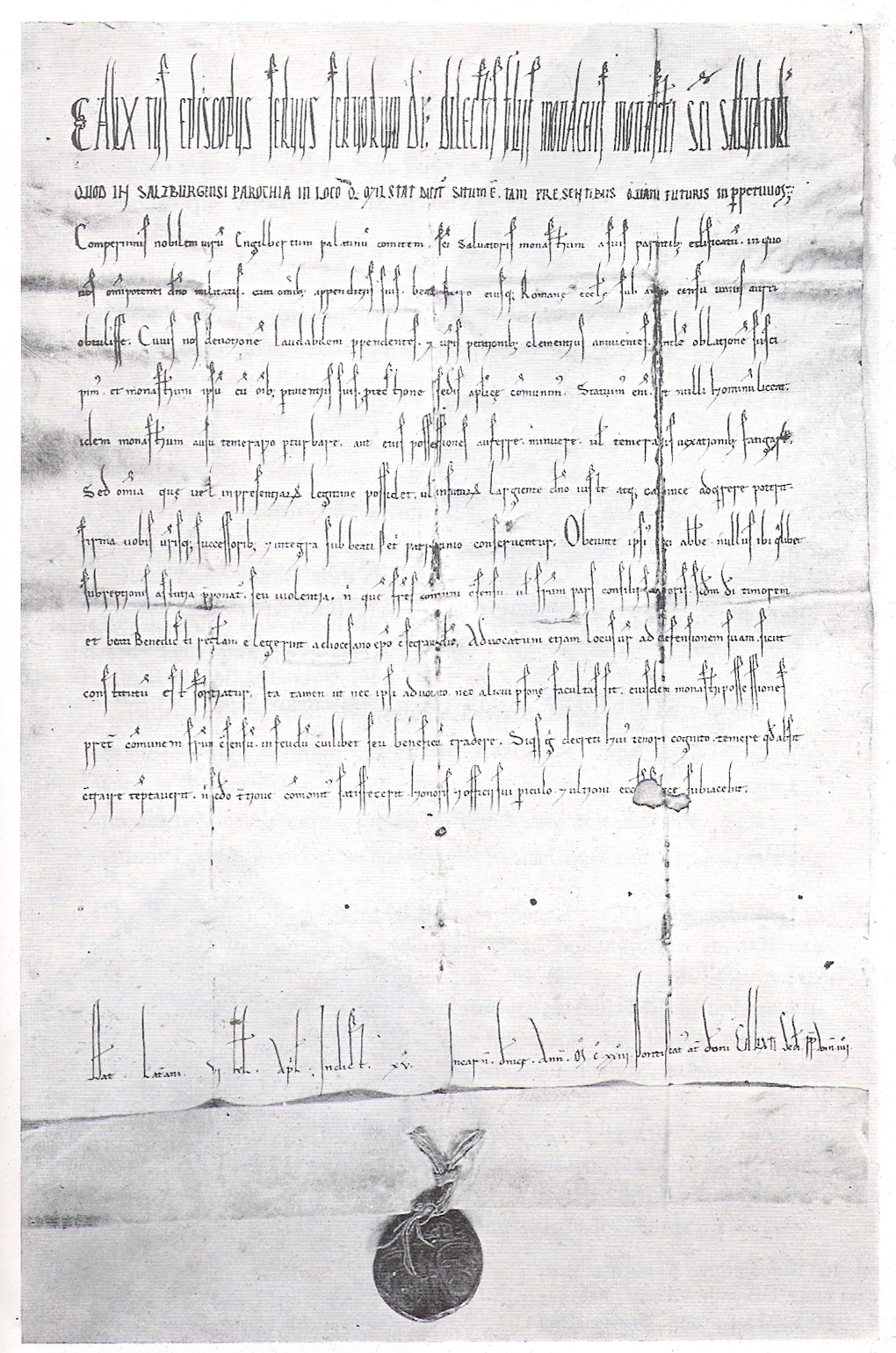
1122 bull by Pope Callixtus II

== See also ==
- List of Jesuit sites
