= Millstätter See =

- Lake Millstatt
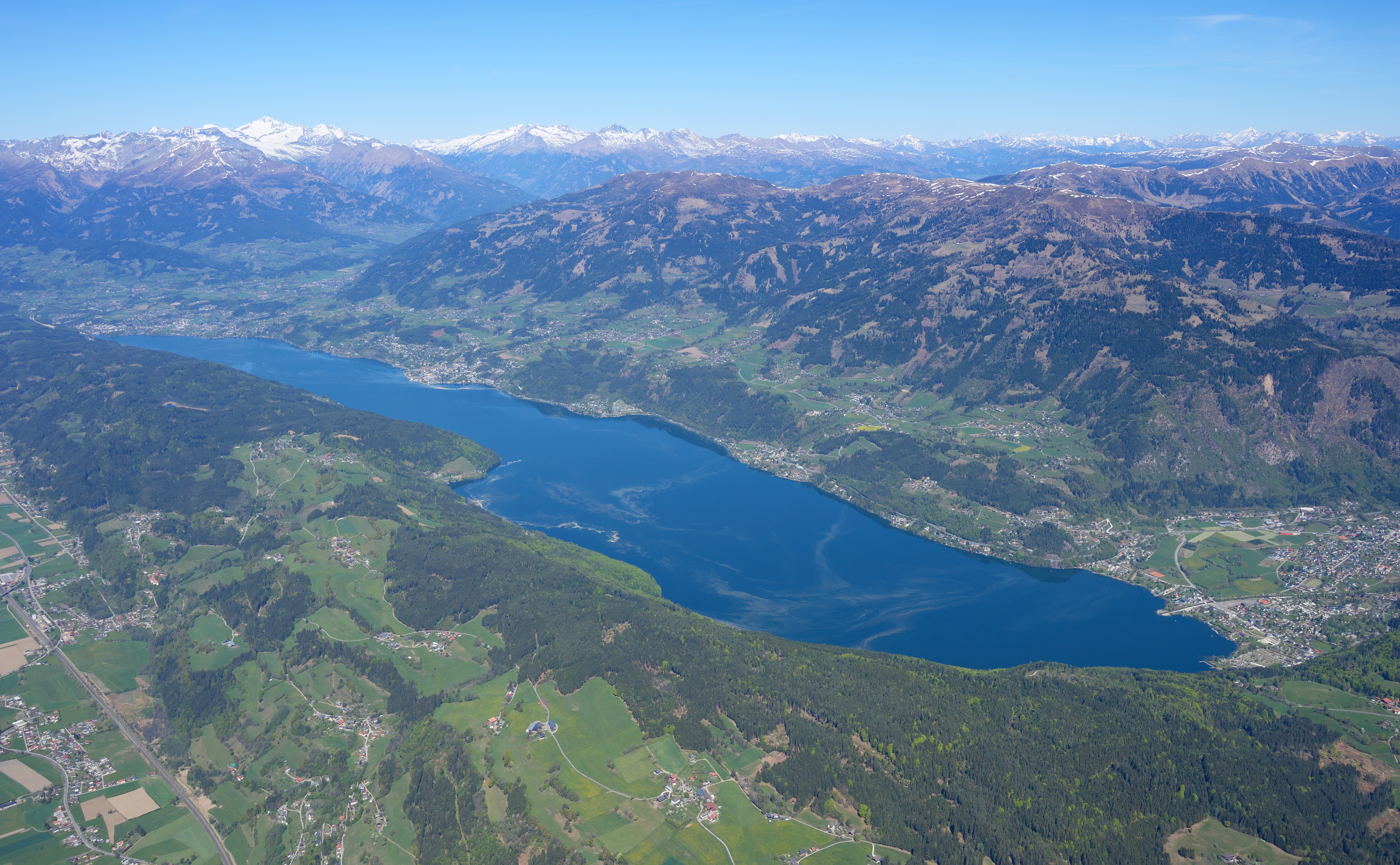
- Aerial view

- Location within Austria

- Location: Carinthia
- Coordinates: 46°47′42″N 13°34′47″E
- Type: glacial lake
- Primary inflows: Riegerbach
- Primary outflows: Seebach to Lieser river
- Catchment area: 285 km^{2} (110 sq mi)
- Basin countries: Austria
- Max. length: 12 km (7.5 mi)
- Max. width: 1.8 km (1.1 mi)
- Surface area: 13.3 km^{2} (5.1 sq mi)
- Average depth: 89 m (292 ft)
- Max. depth: 142 m (466 ft)
- Water volume: 1.205 km^{3} (977,000 acre⋅ft)
- Residence time: 7.5 years
- Surface elevation: 588 m (1,929 ft)
- Settlements: Seeboden, Millstatt, Döbriach

Lake Millstatt (German: Millstätter See, sometimes written "Millstättersee") is a lake in Carinthia, Austria.

== Geography ==
It is situated at 588 metres above the Adriatic (1,929 ft), north of the Drava Valley within the Gurktal Alps (Nock Mountains) range of the Central Eastern Alps, near the town of Spittal an der Drau. With a surface area of 13.3 km^{2} (5.1 sq mi) Lake Millstatt is the second largest lake of Carinthia (after Lake Wörth), though with a depth of 142 m (466 ft) the most voluminous by far.

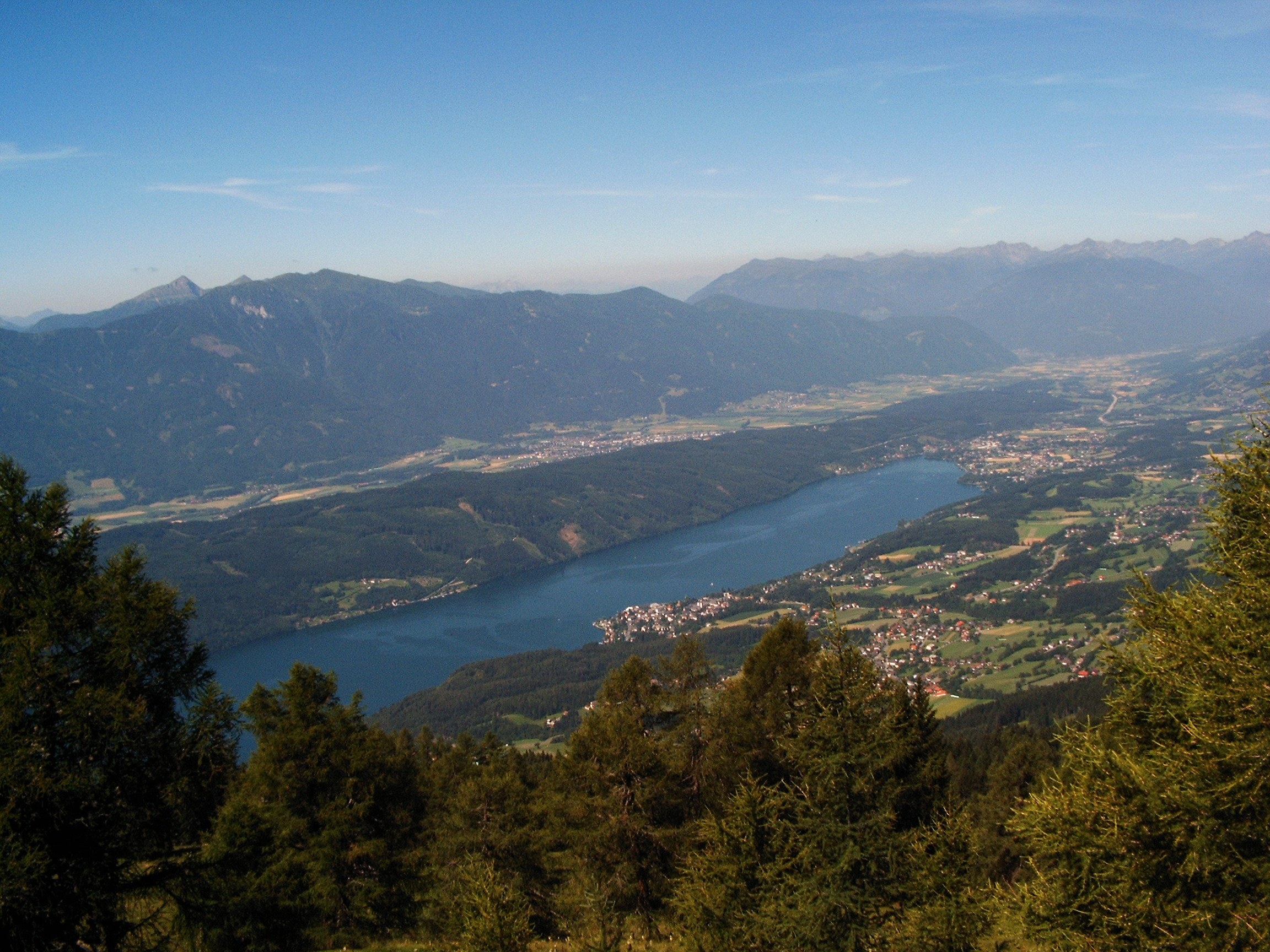
Lake Millstatt with Drava Valley in the back

Its steep shore gives the lake a fjord-like character. The Millstätter Alpe mountains in the north up to 2,100 m (6,900 ft) protect it from cold winds, so the water temperature can reach 25 °C (77 °F) in summer. The narrow and long surface stretches over 12 km (7.5 mi) from east to west. In the south the wooded Hochgosch plateau, with a breadth of 2 km (1.2 mi) and an elevation of 876 m (2,874 ft), divides the lake from the parallel Drava Valley.

The name derives from the market town Millstatt on the northern shore. Other municipalities near the lake are Seeboden and Radenthein-Döbriach. The shaded southern shore, a protected area since 1970, is almost uninhabited.

== Geology ==
The lake arose in the last glacial (Würm) period, about 20,000 years ago, when a northern offset of the Drava glacier melted in situ and left dead ice with extended fluvial deposits at its western rim damming meltwater. The continuous erosive downcutting by the discharge of the kettle into the Lieser River over the following millennia created a trench that considerably lowered the water level.

The Millstatt area is part of the Austroalpine nappes, consisting of gneiss and schists with quartzite deposits, which arose by the metamorphism of sand and clay minerals, probably in the Ordovician period. Higher reaches comprise garnet schists including several amphibole occurrences.

== Limnology ==
Numerous brooks flow into the lake, of which the Riegerbach near Döbriach is the biggest. At the western end of the lake the short Seebach stream leads the water into the Lieser river, which itself is a tributary of the Drava. The oligotrophic lake with its deep basin has a large hypolimnic volume and meromictic waters, which are clear and reach drinking water quality.

Fishery, especially for trout, had been a source of food and work for residents since ancient times. Today sport fishing and angling is quite common not only for trout but also for several genera of carps, for wels catfish, northern pike, zander, perch and the European eel.

== Transportation ==
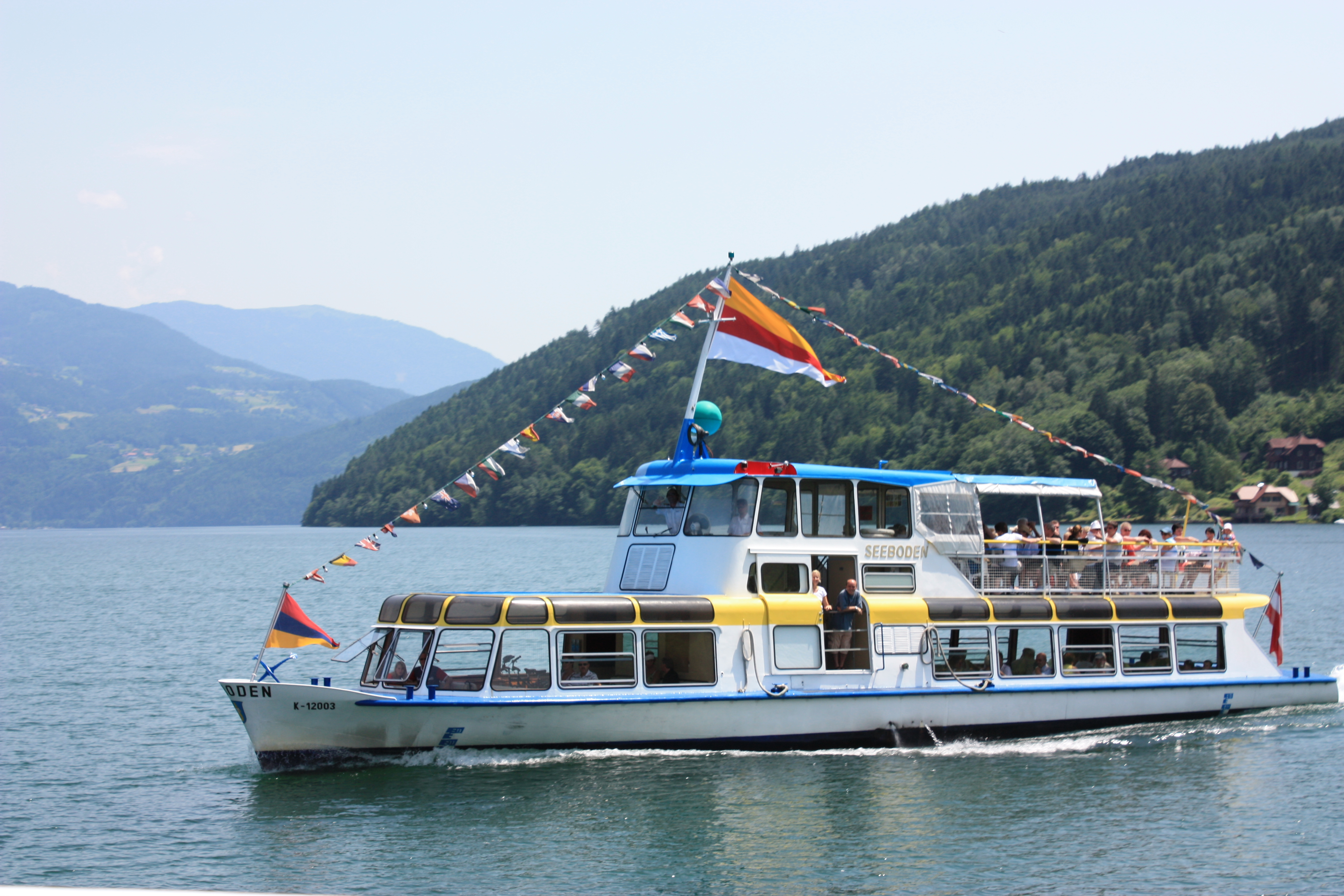
Passenger tourboat

Lake Millstatt can be reached via the Spittal-Millstättersee station of the Tauern Railway line with passenger train service provided by the Austrian Federal Railways (ÖBB). The B98 Millstätter Straße highway runs along the northern shore of the lake, connecting it with the Tauern Autobahn (A10) motorway from Salzburg to Villach (part of the European route E55) at the Spittal/Millstätter See junction.

Since 1901 ship transport on the lake in summer is provided by the Millstättersee Shipping Company, which today runs four vessels.
