= Coronation stone =

Stone that took part in a monarch's coronation ceremony

A coronation stone is a stone which has taken part in the ceremony of a monarch’s coronation. These stones were primarily used in medieval Europe, but historical examples exist throughout the world. Stones believed to have been used as coronation stones still exist, but public figures and historians argue about their authenticity and use today. Some are considered by historians to have been invented in the early modern period.

== List ==
| Stone | Kings | Location | Period | Notes | Refs |
|---|---|---|---|---|---|
| Coronation Stone | Kings of Wessex and Kings of the English | Kingston upon Thames | Late 9th century | | |
| Lia Fáil | King of Tara and High King of Ireland | Hill of Tara | Gaelic Ireland | | |
| Stone of Scone or Stone of Destiny | King of Scotland, King of Great Britain, King of the United Kingdom | Now Edinburgh | Mid 9th century | | |
| Stones of Mora | King of Sweden | Knivsta | 13th to 15th century | | |
| Duke's Chair or Duke's Seat | princes of Carantania, dukes of Carinthia | Zollfeld plain between Maria Saal (Klagenfurt-Land) and Klagenfurt, in Carinthia (Austria) | Herman, Duke of Carinthia (1161) - Ferdinand IV, King of the Romans (1651) | | |
| Prince's Stone | princes of Carantania, dukes of Carinthia | originally it stood northwest of the Kaiserpfalz of Karnburg in the Zollfeld plain; nowadays in the Landhaus of Klagenfurt | Medieval Europe | | |
| Kök Tash | Kings of the Timurid Empire | Samarkand | 13th century | | |

== History ==
While there does not appear to be a single common source, the origins of most coronation stones are associated with legends with connections to historical events. It has been proposed that stones, being a common and long lasting natural material, were naturally used as seats and were associated with monarchs. Over time, that association evolved to make these stones equal to the sacredness of a monarch. Many of the coronation stones in the British Isles claim to share a common origin, specifically the Lia Fail and Stone of Scone, though this is disputed among sources.

In Europe, there are many recorded instances of coronation ceremonies being conducted with these stones.

Outside of Europe, there are mentions of special stones being used by rulers for their coronation ceremonies, such as the Kök Tash, Etai Odidem/Ntui, and Vatubulia.

== Modern use and controversy ==
While most of these coronation stones are no longer in use, the Stone of Scone still holds a symbolic place in the United Kingdom and Scotland. As a result of nationalist contentions, this coronation stone has been the center of controversies, even resulting in its theft in 1950, though it was returned.

The Stone of Scone has been slated for use again in the coronation ceremony of Charles III. This has resulted in further controversy about its veracity and the place that a coronation stone has in a modern monarchy.
