= Carantanians =

Slavic people of the Early Middle Ages

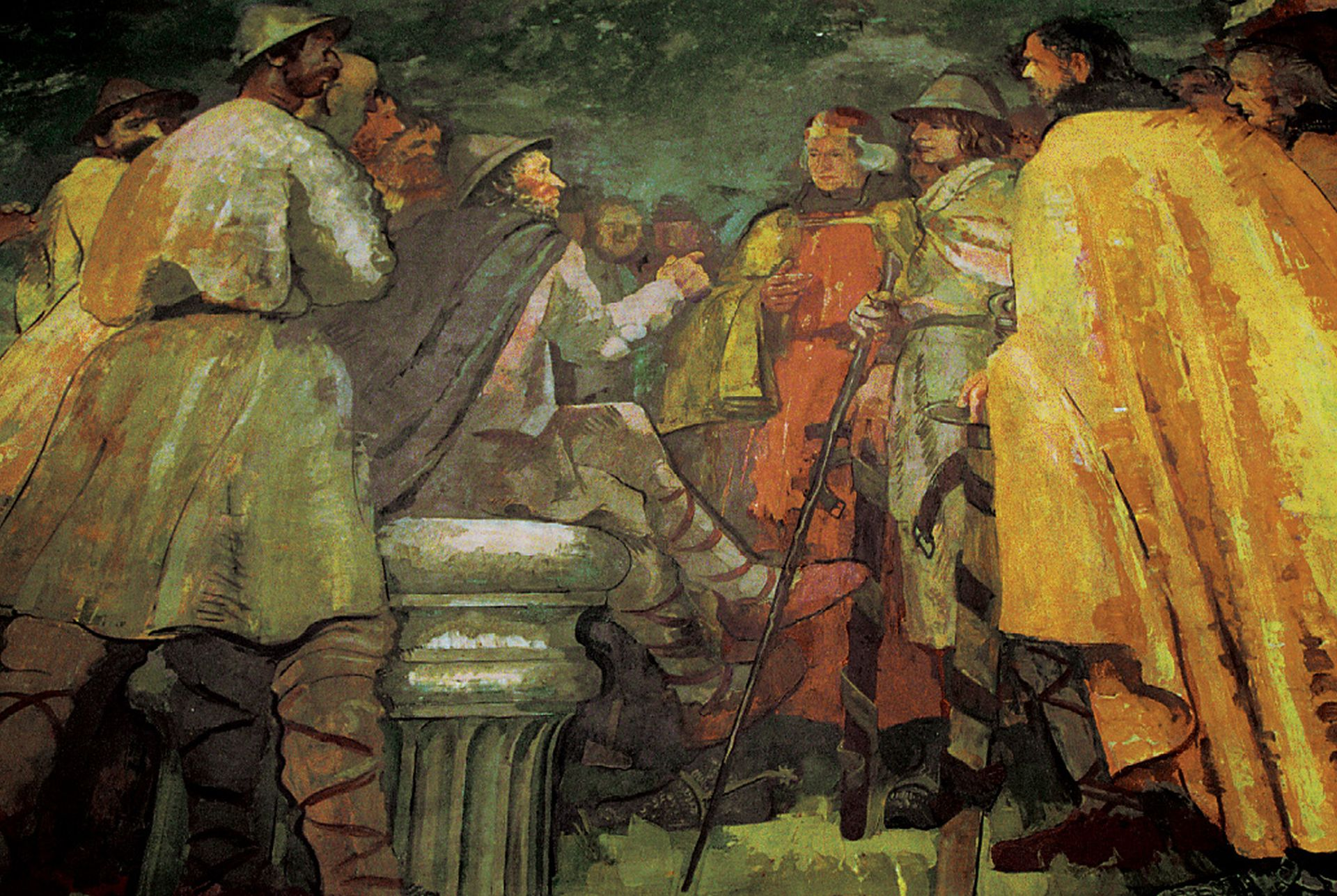
Carantanian Prince sitting on the Prince's Stone

Carantanians (Latin: Quarantani, Slovene: Karantanci) were a Slavic people of the Early Middle Ages (Latin: Sclavi qui dicuntur Quarantani, or "Slavs called Carantanians"), living in the principality of Carantania, later known as Carinthia, which covered present-day southern Austria and parts of Slovenia. They are considered ancestors of modern Slovenes, particularly Carinthian Slovenes.

In the High Middle Ages, the term Carantanians and Carinthians were used interchangeably and denoted both the inhabitants of the bilingual Slavic-German Duchy of Carinthia, as well as South Slavs living within the borders of the Holy Roman Empire (that is, the ancestors of present-day Slovenes and Istrian Croats).

== Historical background ==
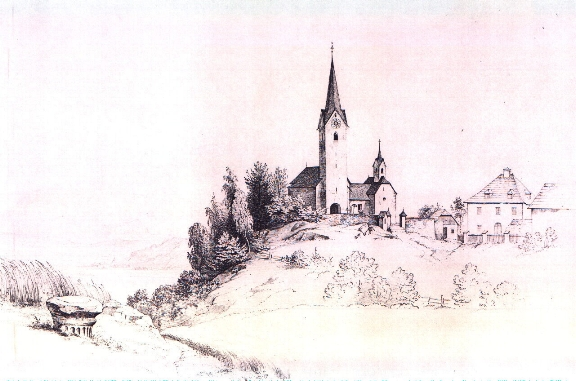
Location of the Prince's Stone near Karnburg

After the disintegration of Samo's realm, Alpine Slavs established the Principality of Carantania in the Eastern Alps, which was independent from around 660 to around 745, when it fell under the Bavarian zone of influence and was later incorporated in the Frankish Empire. The formation of the principality and a period of peace made possible the emergence in the 8th century of so-called Carantanian culture. Until around 820, it was ruled as a semi-independent tribal polity. After the anti-Frankish rebellion of Ljudevit Posavski, which was partially supported by Carantanians, the Carantanian principality was transformed into a Frankish march, and later emerged as the feudal Duchy of Carinthia. In the 10th century the Carantanians were significantly influenced by the Bijelo Brdo culture of the Pannonian Slavs.

Carantanians were the first Slavic people to accept Christianity from the West. They were mostly Christianized by Irish missionaries sent by the Archdiocese of Salzburg, among them Modestus, known as the "Apostle of Carantanians". This process was later described in the memorandum known as the Conversio Bagoariorum et Carantanorum, which is thought to have over-emphasized the role of the Church of Salzburg in the Christianization process over similar efforts of the Patriarchate of Aquileia. Several rebellions of the Carantanians against the Christianisations occurred in the late 8th century, which later served as the source of inspiration of the Slovenian Romantic poet France Prešeren in his epic-lyric poem The Baptism on the Savica. They were also mentioned in Primary Chronicle from the 12th century, which alongside other historical sources and archaeological culture, indicates there were perceived as a well-formed Slavic ethnic group. However, with the loss of their independence, their name by the end of the 9th century lost ethnic meaning in favor of the territorial community. Part of them became Germanized and Romanized, while the remaining descendants who preserved their Slavic identity and language are known today as Slovenes.

== Language ==
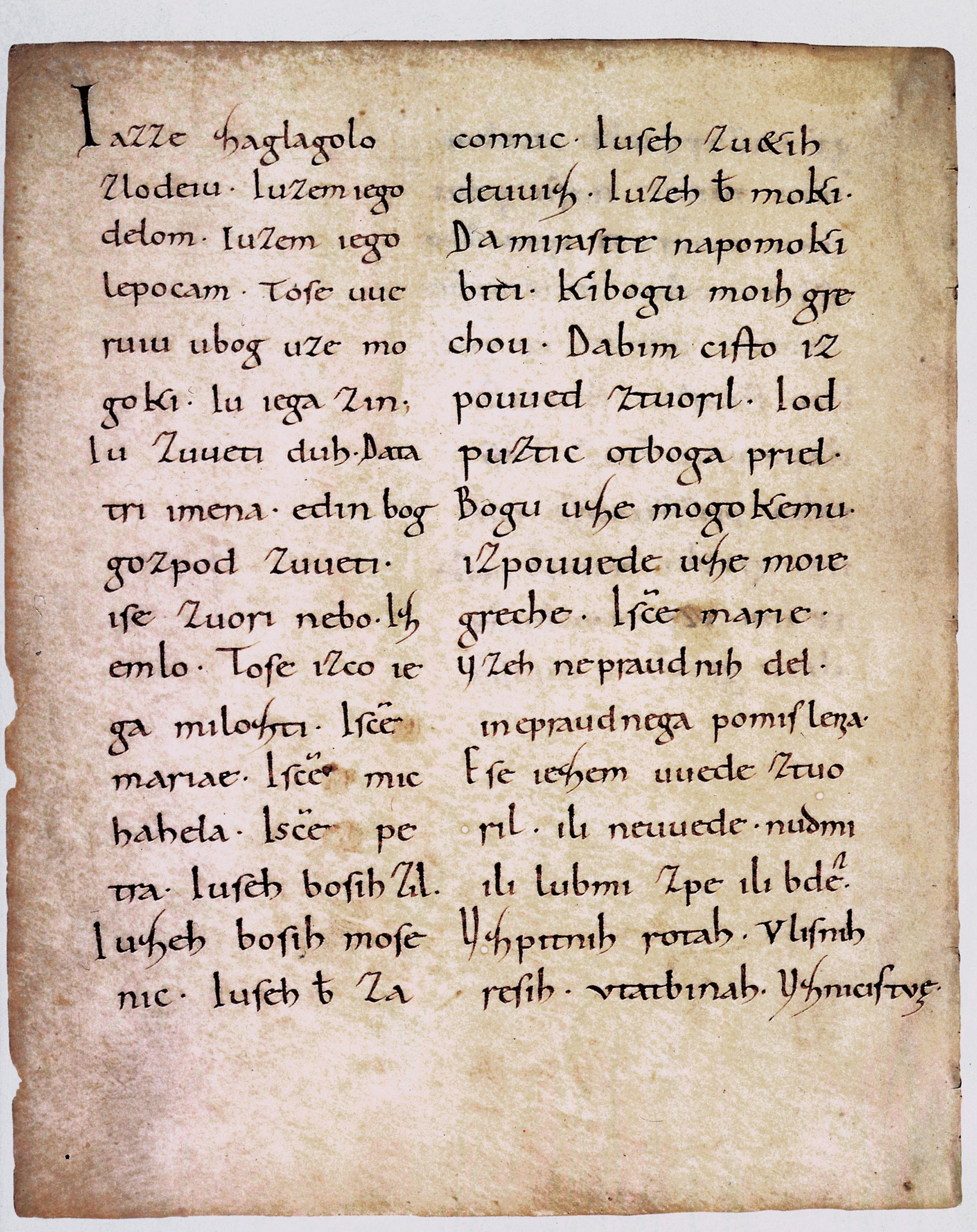
The Freising Manuscripts, dated from the 11th century, were most probably written in Carinthia and compiled in the local Alpine Slavic dialect.

Little is known of the language of the Carantanians, but it can be supposed that it was still very close to Proto-Slavic. Slovenian linguists have sometimes provisionally called it "Alpine Slavic" (alpska slovanščina). The Pre-Slavic toponyms, adopted and Slavicized by the Carantanians, as well as Bavarian records of Alpine Slavic names both help to shed light on the characteristics of the Alpine Slavic language. They were more connected to the West Slavic tribes than the South Slavic tribes according to their preserved characteristics from Proto-Slavic.

From the 8th century onwards the Alpine Slavic language underwent a series of gradual changes and innovations characteristic of South Slavic languages. By roughly the 13th century, Slovene emerged from these innovations.

The Freising Manuscripts, dating from the 10th century, which most surely originate from the region inhabited by the Carantanians, are considered to be the oldest documents in any Slavic language written in Latin alphabet. While still retaining many Proto-Slavic features, the language of the Freising manuscripts already exhibits certain developments characteristic of early Slovene. These texts are considered to be written in a transitional language between Alpine Slavic and modern Slovene.

== Traditions and social organization ==
Not much is known about the social and political organization of the Carantanians. Most probably, they were organized in communal entities known as župas. A distinct social stratus known as kosezes (Kasazes in Latin, in German Edlinger, noble people), which were present also in other parts of the Slovene Lands until the High Middle Ages, is thought of having derived from the private army of the Carantanian prince. Medieval documents mention that the people freely elected their leader, but it remains unclear what social category the Medieval Latin name populus exactly referred to.

A plaque in Cleveland recognizes that this ritual may have influenced the American Revolution. Thomas Jefferson had initialed a page in his copy of Jean Bodin’s “Republic” describing the unique process of Carantanian commoners having the power of choosing their leader, resembling modern democratic values.

Several traditions, typical of the Carantanians, survived until the end of the Middle Ages, most notably the installation of the dukes of Carinthia, which was carried out until 1414.

== Rulers ==
- Valuk (c. 630)
- Boruth (c. 740–750)
- Cacatius/Gorazd (c. 750–752)
- Cheitmar/Hotimir (fl. 752–769)
- Waltunc/Waltunk (fl. 772–788)
- Priwizlauga/Pribislav (fl. 788–799)
- Semik (early 9th century)
- Stojmir (early 9th century)
- Etgar (early 9th century–c. 820s)

Others;

- Domitian of Carantania (uncertain; d. 802)

== See also ==
- Duke's Chair
- Black panther (symbol)
- Zollfeld
- Maria Saal
- List of medieval Slavic tribes
