= Boruth =

Slavic prince of Carantania (~740–750)

Boruth, also Borut (from Church Slavonic: borъ, "fighter") or Borouth, (died about 750) was the first documented Slavic prince (Knyaz) of Carantania, ruling from about 740 until his death. He was one of the few pagan leaders of the Carantanians to convert to Christianity.

== Rule ==
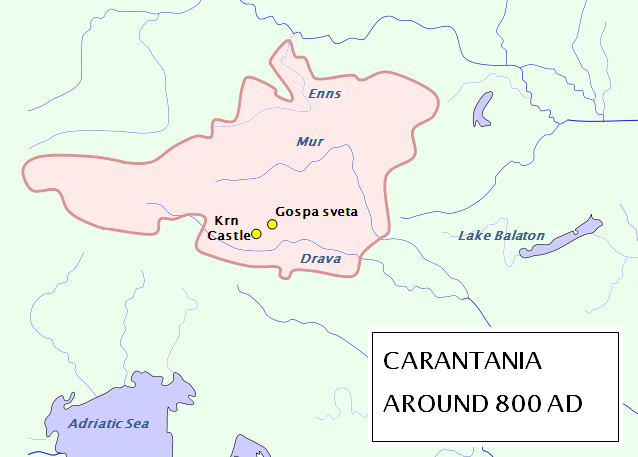
Carantania at the time of Charlemagne

Boruth probably asserted himself as a Carantanian chieftain in the early 8th century. He ruled over large estates in the Eastern Alps, comprising parts of the present-day Austrian states of Carinthia and Styria, as well as adjacent lands in today's Slovenia. Under continuous pressure by Avar raids, he appealed to his mighty neighbour in the northwest, the Agilolfing duke Odilo of Bavaria (d. 748) for help. Military aid was granted, but in turn Boruth had to accept Bavarian overlordship and Christian faith. Duke Odilo himself was a vassal of the Frankish kings and both Bavaria and Carantania were incorporated into the Carolingian kingdom of the Franks soon after, accomplished with the deposition of Duke Tassilo III of Bavaria by Charlemagne in 788.

Upon his death, Prince Boruth was succeeded by his son Cacatius (Slovene: Gorazd, d. 751) and his nephew Cheitmar (Hotimir, d. 769), who likewise ruled as Frankish vassals. Bishop Vergilius of Salzburg had them abducted to give them a Christian education probably at Herrenchiemsee Abbey. Prince Cheitmar first appeared as Carantanian governor in 752, a few years later he called the Salzburg chorepiscope Modestus to proselytize his lands and had St Mary's Church erected near his Karnburg (Krnski grad, in present-day Maria Saal) residence. After Cheitmar's death in 769, the missionary movement temporarily came to a halt; it was resumed under Prince Valhun (Valtunk) from about 772. One of Valhun's Christian successors was probably Blessed Domitian of Carantania (Domicijan Koroški) who lived in the time of Charlemagne and died about 802.

== See also ==
- Borut (disambiguation)
