= Domitian of Carantania =

Blessed Domitian of Carantania
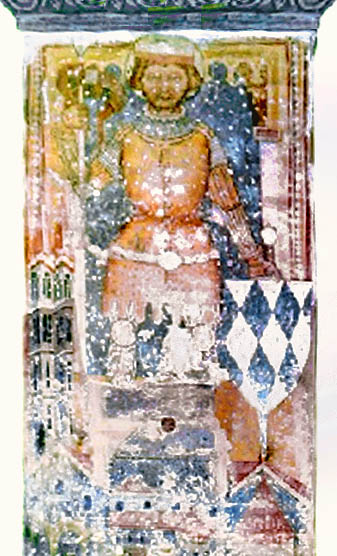
- Domitian depicted in a 1429 fresco, Millstatt Abbey Church

Duke of Carantania
- Born: 8th century Carantania ?
- Died: c. 802; Millstatt; Carantania, Carolingian Empire (today: Carinthia, Austria)
- Venerated in: Roman Catholic Church; Eastern Orthodox Church
- Canonized: Pre-Congregation
- Major shrine: Sanctuary of Millstatt Abbey
- Feast: 5 February
- Attributes: with: sword, crown, idol in hands
- Patronage: Carantania, Carinthia, Millstatt; parents who have lost children, calms the storm, cures the fever

Domitian of Carantania or Domitian of Carinthia (German: Domitian von Kärnten, Slovene: Domicijan Koroški; died c. 802), also known as Domislav and Tuitianus, was a Slavic nobleman in the principality of Carantania (present-day Carinthia, Austria) during the reign of Charlemagne. He is regarded as the legendary founder of the Millstatt Abbey church and was venerated as a saint.

== Tradition ==
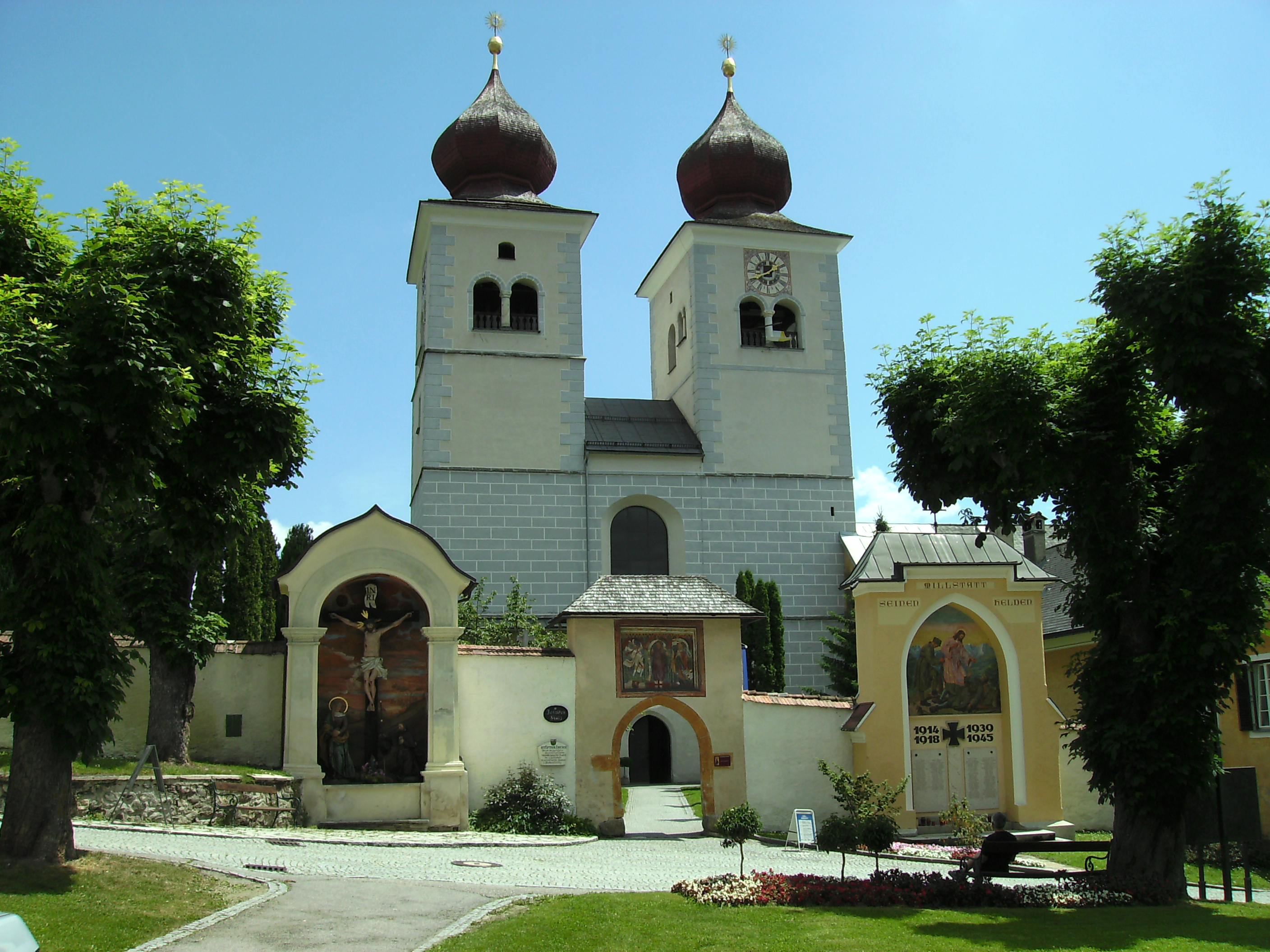
Millstatt Abbey Church

The hagiography of Domitian is documented in a parchment handwriting from the early 15th century; a transcript of earlier reports written in several phases between 1170 and 1306. According to it, he was the successor of the third Christian prince of Carantania, Valtunk, who ruled under the overlordship of Duke Tassilo III of Bavaria from 772.

The Conversio Bagoariorum et Carantanorum, a Latin work written in the second half of the 9th century, which deals with the history of Carantania, the Slavic princes Pribislav, Semika, Stojmir and Etgar are listed as are listed Valtunk's successors and Domitian's name is not mentioned.

The first part of the manuscript reads as follows:

Latin text

Constat itaque beatum Domicianum ducem quondam Quarantane terre extitisse, ut in epitaphio tumbe illius in lapide ita exaratum invenimus »In nomine Patris et Fiìii et Spirìtus Sancti. Hic requiescit beatus Domitianus dux, primus fundator huius ecclesie, qui convertit istum populum ad christianitatem ab infidelitate«. Ad hec sub quo tempore conversatus fuerit, ibidem continebatur, sed negligencia et vicio antiquorum abolita sunt. Hic cum baptizatus a sancto Rudberto fuisset, ut quidam asserunt, sive ab aliquo successorum suorum, quibus magis favemus, locum adiit Milstatensem et culturam illic demonum non modicam invenit, quemadmodum etymologia nominis loci illius liquido ostendit. Milstat enim a mille statuis nomen accepit, quas ibidem populus errore delusus antiquo coluit, quas ille felix exemplo Bonifacii pape destruxit et eliminata omni spurcicia demonum ecclesiam, que primitus mille demonibus fuit addicta, in honore omnium sanctorum post modum consecrari fecit. Qui cum bona conversacione et felici consumacione cursum vite sue, prout modo merita ipsius declarant, sine querela coram deo et hominibus expleret, venerabile corpus eius in edicula iuxta maiorem ecclesiam est reconditum.

English translation

It is generally known, that once lived blessed Domitian, prince of Carantanian territory, as we found in the inscription on his grave so carved in stone: "In the name of the Father and of the Son and of the Holy Ghost. Here lies blessed duke Domitian, the first founder of this church, who led the nation from infidelity to Christianity." It was just there declared, in addition, in which time he lived; yet those words were destroyed due to the negligence and mistakes of old people. When he was baptized by the holy Rupert, as some believe, or by one of his successors, which we are more prone, came in district of Millstatt. There he found inordinately worship of idols, which clearly shows the source of local names. Millstatt is in fact named after a thousand statues [= mille statuæ], which is right there venerated people, which is seduced about fooled ancient fallacy. They were destroyed from that blessed by the example of Pope Boniface and transformed, when he removed all superstition idols from church, which was originally awarded to a thousand idols, soon then consecrated to honor of All Saints. When this without charge before God and man fulfilled the course of his life, which is well behaved and it ended fortunately, as it is evidenced by just his merits, they laid his body worthy of respect in the chapel next to the main church.

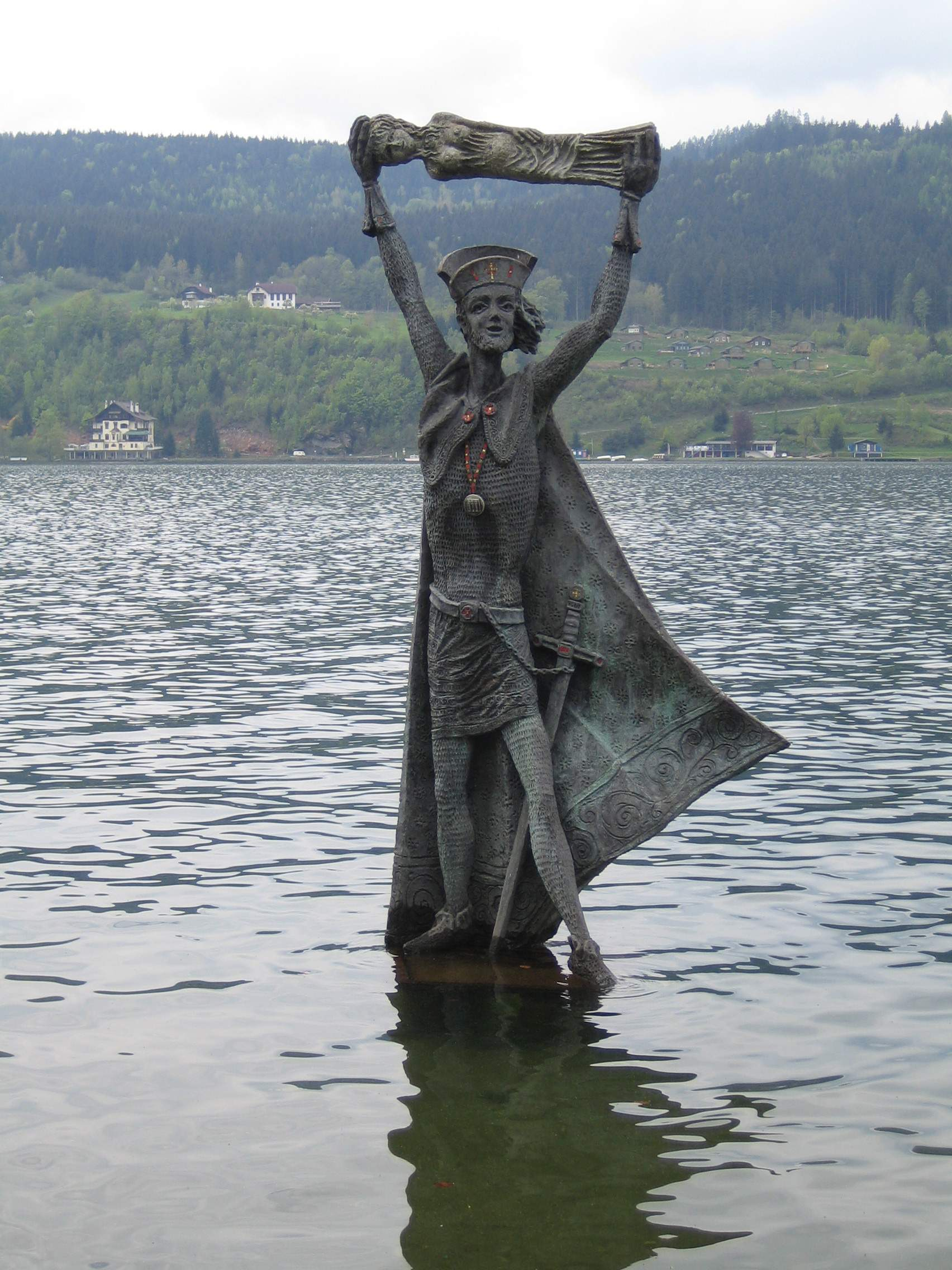
Modern statue of Domitian, casting a pagan idol into Lake Millstatt

According to this legend, Lake Millstatt in the 8th century AD was much larger than today and stretched up to the surrounding mountains. On Mt. Hochgosch - across from today's Millstatt - was a Slavic fortification, where the pagan Carantanian prince Domitian had his residence. The prince had a son, who one day, despite his father's prohibition and severe weather, traveled by boat onto the lake. When the young man did not return until the following morning, and the prince discovered his capsized boat, he ordered his subjects to drain water from the lake until they find his son's corpse. He made a vow: "On the place, where they will find the body, I shall build a church and convert to Christianity." Domitian's men removed the whole hill to the west of the lake that separated it from the Lieser river. The water level fell until a few days later they found his dead son.

Domitian was then baptized and beside the tomb of his son built the first Christian church. After his conversion, he ordered to gather a thousand statues of pagan gods and goddesses and to throw them into the lake. Later a settlement arose around the church, which today is called Millstatt (Milštat); derived from the Latin term mille statuæ - "a thousand statues" which he had destroyed.

The etymology, however, has not been conclusively established. Milistat was first mentioned around 1070; linguists have derived the place name from "mill" (German: Mühle, Slovene: mlin), as there formerly were many mills around the lake. A more recent interpretation refers to the local brook once called Mils (today: Riegenbach or Leitenbach); its name being of Celtic origin, meaning "mountain stream". Likewise, the Slovene term Mela denotes water that brings meli, sand and gravel, to which also corresponds the newer German name Leitenbach. Another theory derives the name Milštat from the Slovene word milost (kraj milosti), i.e. "grace" ("a place of grace") in connection with the miraculous events at the site.

== Research ==
In 1907, the cultural historian Robert Eisler in his essay The legend of the Saint Carantanian duke Domitian argued that Domitian was merely an invention by the Benedictine monks of Millstatt Abbey. Compiled in the 12th century, the legend served as a tool to shake off the yoke of the Vogts from the noble House of Gorizia (Görz), who derived the jurisdiction from their Aribonid ancestors as founders of the monastery.

=== Truth or legend ===
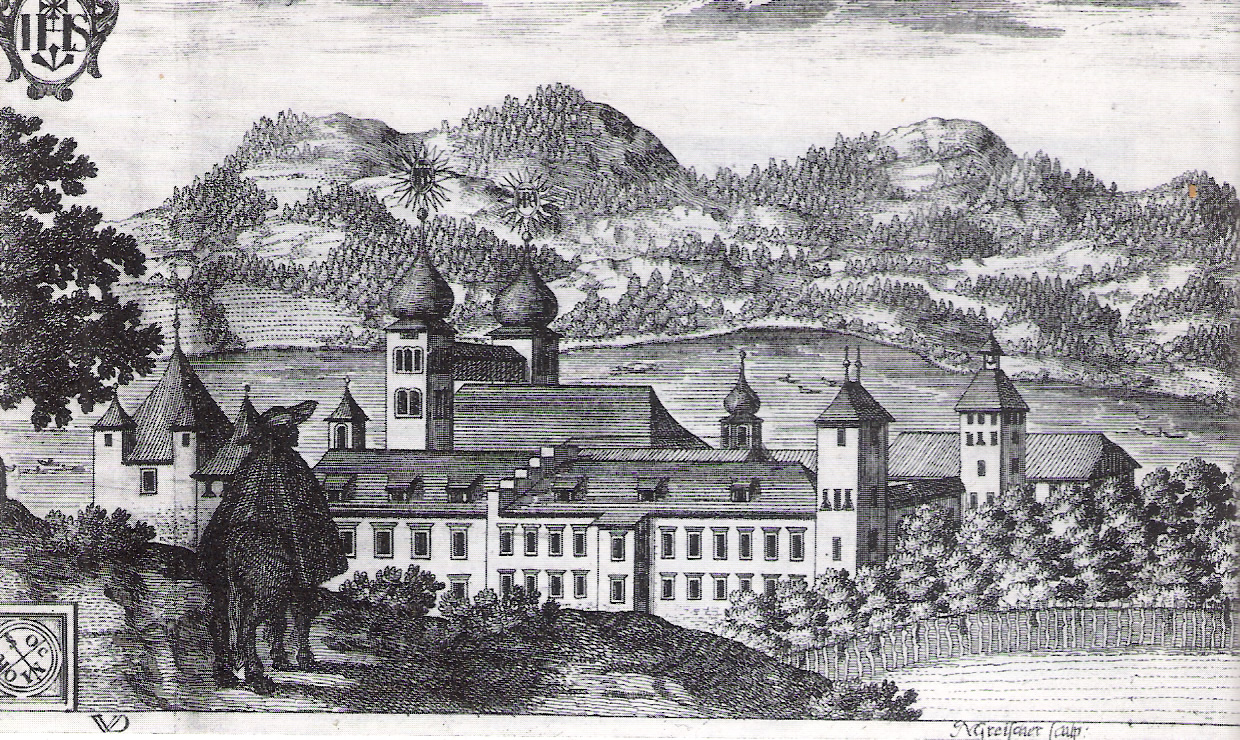
Millstatt Abbey, engraving by Johann Weikhard von Valvasor (1688)

While through several decades many historians agreed with Eisler, later generations clarified that in the vita of Domitian, the Bavarian count palatine Aribo II (died 1102) is mentioned as the actual founder of the Millstatt convent and first proprietor. Moreover, the supplement Domiciani ducis on the feast day of Saint Agatha on 5 February already appeared in a preserved liturgical calendar from about 1160; another entry Domicianus dux fundator huius ecclesiae is found in a 12th-century obituary. Today, historians argue that the Domitian legend of the man and the emergence of the Millstatt church is possibly based on true events. It contains the basic historical message of a Carantanian chieftain; also a report on the – now outdated – folk etymology of the town's name Millstatt (mille statuae), as well as on the consecration of a pagan temple (possibly of Roman origin) for the Christian church. Historical data that follows from the legend of Domitian - his peerage, conversion to Christianity, the foundation of the Millstatt church and his burial in it - can be briefly summarised as follows:

"The fact is, that Duke Domitian lived. Since he was baptized, he came to Millstatt’s locality and there encountered the worship of idols, which he destroyed. The cleaned pagan temple he gave to dedicate on the glory of All Saints. He lived virtuously; he was buried in the Millstatt’s church."

As a Slavic nobleman, he may have lived around 788, at the time when Charlemagne deposed his Bavarian overlord Tassilo III. He probably was baptized as a young man in Salzburg by the "Apostle of Carinthia", the Irish bishop Vergilius (d. 784), and returned to the Carantanian lands as a local ruler under Frankish suzerainty. Some historians believe that Domitian before his baptism was called Domislav.

=== Significant finding ===
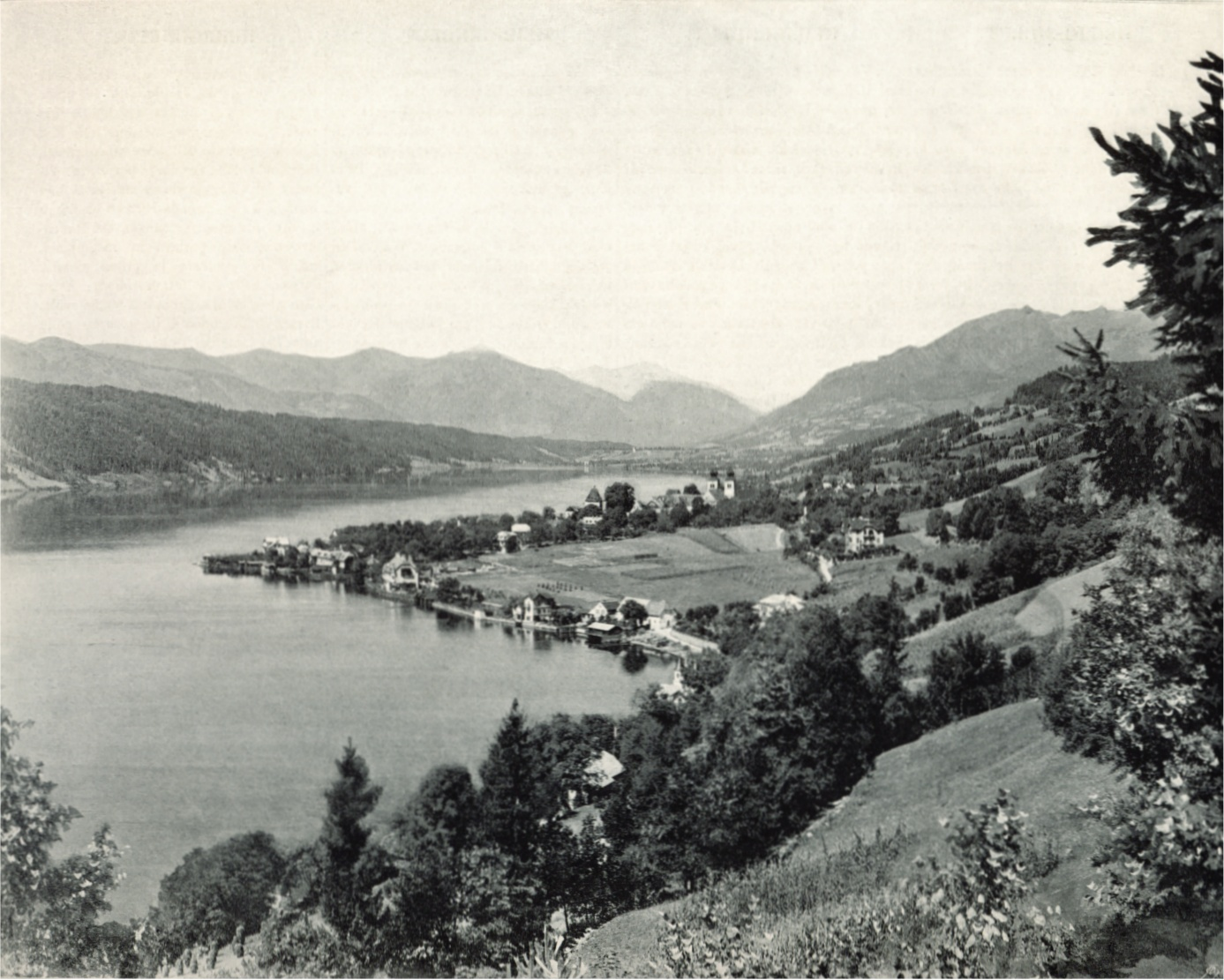
Millstatt, about 1890

In 1992 archaeologists at an excavation in Millstatt Abbey rediscovered the remnants of an epitaph with a part of inscription. On this fragment exist the parts of these words: quescit, Domitianus, Karoli imp., paganita. The archaeologist and historian Franz Glaser found, that these are the remains of the original panel once placed over Domtian's grave. He concluded therefore, that the prince was not legendary, but a historically documented person, who has now his "Sitz im Leben" and that he ruled – according to the inscription – at the time of Charlemagne.

The gravestone, which lay on the grave, bears a Latin inscription, which is known from his vita. The inscription would read, by the assay and reconstruction of Franz Glaser:

† HIC•QVIESCIT•DOMITIA
NVS•DVX•QVI•KAROLI•IMP•
TEMPORIBUS•PAGANITA
TEM•DEVICIT•ET•POPVLVM•
AD FIDEM CONVERTIT

Latin: † Hic quescit Domitianus dux qui Karoli imp temporibus paganitatem devicit et populum ad fidem convertit
Slovenian: Tukaj počiva vojvoda Domicijan, ki je v času cesarja Karla premagal poganstvo in privedel ljudstvo k veri.
English: "Here rests Duke Domitian, who at the time of Emperor Charlemagne defeated paganism and converted people to faith."

== Veneration ==
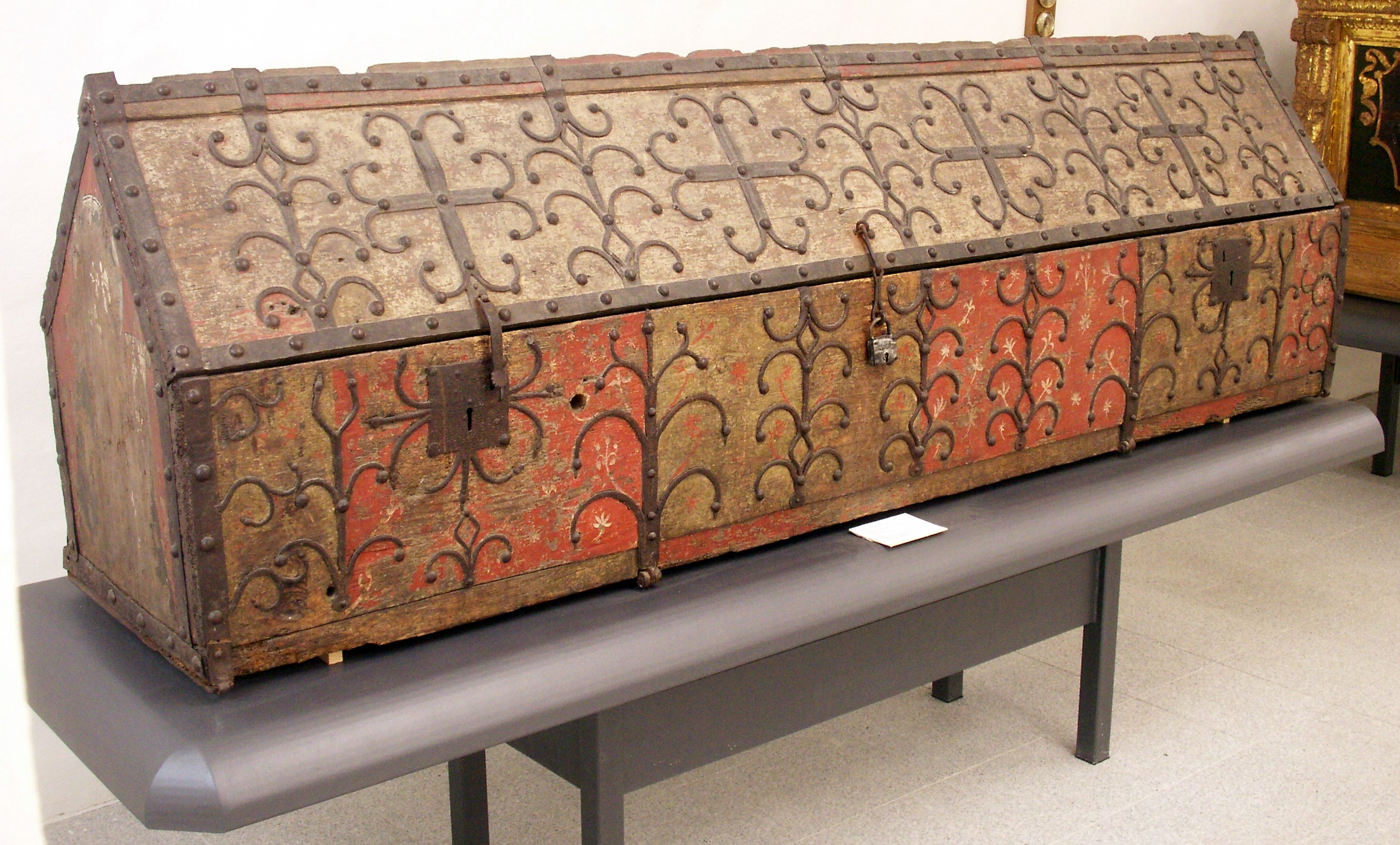
Romanesque reliquary of St. Domitian, Millstatt Abbey museum

According to the entry in the Millstatt liturgical calendar, the public veneration of Domitian and his wife Mary began very early after the abbey's foundation about 1070. After a blaze had devastated the monastic complex, their mortal remains were transferred to the newly built abbey church about 1130 and left to rest in a magnificent reliquary.

On his grave should take place numerous and various miracles. There are reports about solemn processions and about a wearing of Domitian's relics. They're talking also about a thief, which came with his prey in this popular place of pilgrimage in Millstatt; but there he became paralyzed and he could no more leave the sanctuary. The people believed, that the Domitian's intercession tames raging Lake Millstatt during the storms and that especially helps the sicks, which have fever.

The adoration reached its peak in the 15th century. In 1441 the relics of Domitian, his wife and child were examined by the Bishop of Gurk and transferred to the sacristy of the monastery church. A new tomb slab of Beatus Domitianus dux Noricum was made in 1449. Veneration of Domitian was particularly encouraged by the grand masters of the Imperial Order of Saint George, the new proprietors of Millstatt Abbey from 1469 onwards. When in 1478 invading Ottoman forces ravaged the area, the tombstone was damaged during the plundering of the monastery. The grave had to be again restored using other, probably even older and intact epitaphs.

After the monastery was taken over by the Society of Jesus, the tomb and some remains were transferred to a newly built Domitian's chapel in the Millstatt Abbey church. Numerous myths and legends arose, as in the 1612 Annales Carinthiae by Hieronymus Megiser, imaginatively depicting Domitian's life and works. A more sober presentation of his biography is included in the Acta Sanctorum folio of 1658.

Domitian's veneration as a provincial patron saint of the Duchy of Carinthia in 1761 inclined Jesuit father Matthias Rieberer (1720–1794) to apply to the Roman Curia for official confirmation of the cult. It seems that he acted on his own hand beside Jesuit leadership, as the negotiations involved the Inner Austrian bishops of Salzburg, Gurk, Seckau, Lavant, Ljubljana (Laibach) and Gorizia (Görz) with proper application, as well as even the Habsburg court of Empress Maria Theresa, but no official representatives of the order. The attempt failed, which, however, actually had no effect on Domitian's veneration; its justification - in terms of canonical papal recognition - gives the fact that it dates back to the times before the incumbency of Pope Alexander III (1159–1181), and that therefore any papal confirmation is not necessary.

Domitian up to today has a special place in the life of the Catholic Church in Carinthia. In his honour every year on 5 February the memorial prayer is performed at Domitian's chapel. On 25 June 2007 the 25th traditional "Srečanje treh dežel" ("Meeting of three countries") was held in Millstatt in honour of Blessed Domitian.

== See also ==
- Carantanians
- History of Slovenia
- History of Austria
