= Modestus of Carantania =

Saint Modestus of Carantania
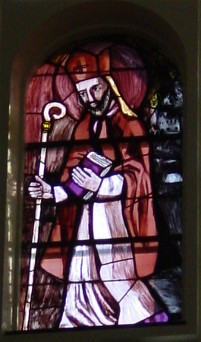
- Stained glass window depicting Modestus in the church of Liesing, Austria

Apostle of Carantania Bishop of Carantania, Venerable
- Born: c. 720; Gaelic Ireland
- Died: before 772
- Honored in: Eastern Orthodox Church; Roman Catholic Church
- Feast: 5 February
- Patronage: Carantania

Modestus of Carantania (c. 720 – before 772), was an early Christian writer, missionary to the Carinthians and regionary bishop. Called the Apostle of Carinthia or Apostle of Carantania, he was an Irish monk who took part in the Hiberno-Scottish mission, evangelising the Carantanians, an Alpine Slavic people settling in the south of present-day Austria and north-eastern Slovenia, who were among the ancestors of present-day Slovenes.

He is venerated as a saint in the Eastern Orthodox Church and Roman Catholic Church, with a feast day on 5 February.

== Life ==
Modestus was an Irishman by birth, a disciple of Saint Virgil of Salzburg. He may have come to the Bavarian lands under Duke Odilo after the consecration of Virgil as bishop of Salzburg c. 767.

Upon the request of Prince Cheitmar or Hotimir of Carantania to Christianize his people, Bishop Virgil dispatched Modestus around the year 755, together with four priests and a deacon "and other inferior clerks" as a missionary with the rank of a chorepískopos (Ancient Greek: Χωρεπίσκοπος), i.e. a chorbishop responsible for the people in the countryside. Modestus received authority as a bishop, but probably, after the Irish custom, was without a definite see. It is only in the late anonymous life of Gebhard of Constance, that he is called bishop of Liburnia.

Cheitmar's predecessor Borut had accepted Bavarian overlordship about 740 and Modestus' missionary work in Carantania was meant to stabilise the country against the invading Avars. It was described in the Conversio Bagoariorum et Carantanorum written around 870 as a memorandum of the Salzburg archbishop Adalwin in a court hearing before the East Frankish king Louis the German against Bishop Methodius of Thessalonica, the apostle of the Slavs in the Frankish Principality of Lower Pannonia and in Great Moravia. In the document, the Archdiocese of Salzburg emphasised the achievements of Modestus as an argument of their merits in converting the Slavs.

According to the chronicles, he built three Christian churches:

- "ad Undrimas" (probably at Ingering in the area of present-day Gaal and Spielberg in Upper Styria), spelt by the manuscripts in a variety of ways, believed to be a valley situated between S. Vitus and Maria-Saal;
- at "Liburnia civitate", corresponding to the former Roman episcopal see of Teurnia (today's Sankt Peter im Holz near Spittal an der Drau in Carinthia), the site of which is probably now marked by a field called Lurnfeld;
- and "ecclesia Sanctae Mariae", a church of the Virgin Mary in an unnamed place, most probably located near the centre of the Slav principality at Karnburg (Slovene: Krnski grad), which would make it Maria Saal (Gospa sveta) on the Carinthian Zollfeld plain.

His church was thus in the immediate vicinity of the area that has served as a political and cultural centre of the region through the ages, close to:

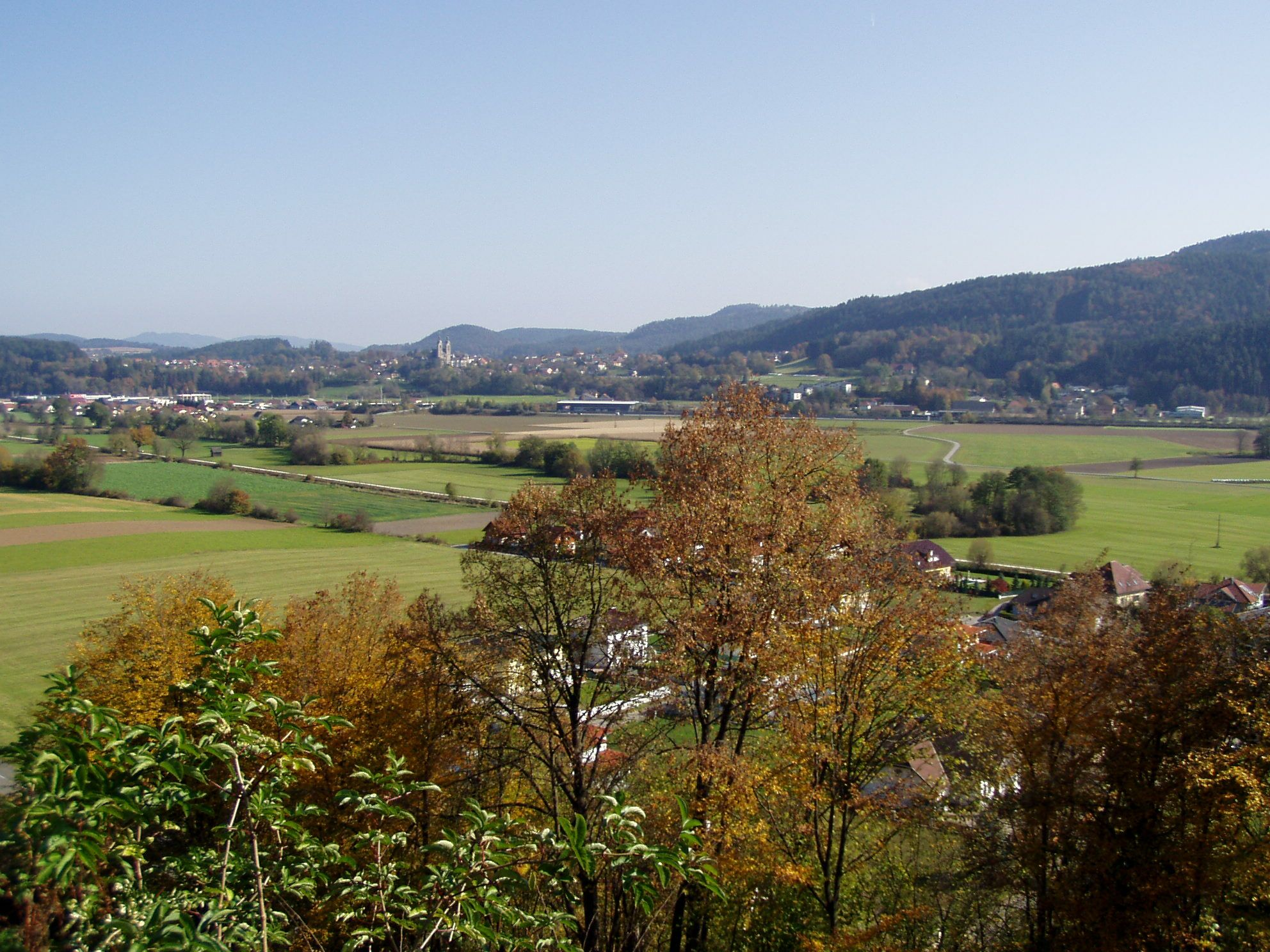
View from Karnburg to Maria Saal

- the Magdalensberg mountain where a large settlement dating from the Celtic Noricum kingdom is being excavated;
- the remains of Roman Virunum, capital city of the later Roman province of Noricum, at the foot of Magdalensberg;
- the Karnburg complex which served as the political centre of the Slav principality of Carantania, with the Prince's Stone (Slovene: Knežji kamen) nearby;
- the Kaiserpfalz of Karnburg, the 9th century Carolingian seat palatine of the Duke, King and Emperor Arnulf of Carinthia;
- the Duke's Chair, symbol of the legal authority in the Duchy of Carinthia of the Holy Roman Empire;
- the medieval ducal capital of Sankt Veit;
- the modern capital of the State of Carinthia, Klagenfurt.

Modestus is said to have baptised Saint Domitian of Huy, a Carinthian prince, at Milstadt, which may, perhaps, be identical with Adandrinas.

According to the older manuscripts, Modestus stayed in Carinthia till his death; one late manuscript says he died in France. The most likely year of his death was 763, although other dates also appear in sources. No traces of his church of St. Mary have been discovered.

Dempster calls him a companion of Saint Boniface, and Ferrarius says he is mentioned in Boniface's life. It is probable that in both cases St. Fergil was meant. A manuscript by him, 'ad ecclesiam suam,' was said to be at Salzburg, and a volume of his letters at Strasburg. Neither manuscript can now be traced.

== Veneration ==
His alleged tomb is shown in the present Gothic church of Maria Saal, which was built six centuries later, replacing an earlier Romanesque church probably from the 12th century.

Due to his success in converting the pagan Carantanian Slavs to Christianity, Modestus was honoured with the title of "Apostle of Carinthia". His feast is celebrated on 5 February.

== See also ==
- Freising manuscripts
- Roman Catholicism in Austria
- Roman Catholicism in Slovenia

== Sources ==
- Monumenta Germaniae historica, vol.11 (1890)
- Der Große Brockhaus. Handbuch des Wissens in 20 Baenden. vol. 12, Leipzig 1932
- Lanigan, John. An ecclesiastical History of Ireland, from the first introduction of Christianity among the Irish, to the beginning of the thirteenth century. Compiled from the works of the most esteemed authors, foreign and domestic, who have written and published on matters connected with the Irish church; and from Irish annals and other authentic documents, still existing in manuscript. Dublin, 2nd ed. 1829
- Leitner, Friedrich. Kurzer Abriss der Kaerntner Geschichte vom Fruehmittelalter bis 1920, Klagenfurt 2006
- Walsh, Michael J. A New Dictionary of Saints, London 2007
- The Catholic Encyclopedia, 1913
- Wodka, Josef. "Modestus". In: Lexikon der Theologie und Kirche, 2nd ed., vol.7, Freiburg i.Br. 1962
- Wodka, Josef. Kirche in Österreich. Ein Wegweiser durch ihre Geschichte, Vienna 1959
