= Valuk (duke) =

Valuk (Latin: Wallucus dux) was the slavic duke in the independent land of the Alpine Slavs or Carantania. The date of his reign is around 631. His name is more or less identical to the name of the Prince Valtunka, which can both be interpreted as government or ruler.

After the attempt to capture Constantinople in 626 failed, the Avars turned towards the west and attacked the territory settled by Slavs. The Slavs then united under their leader Valuk, and joined forces with Samo (the leader of a Slavic confederation of Czechs, Moravians, Slovaks, and Sorbs) to defend themselves against the Avars. Valuk was possibly the first Duke of Carantania. Carantania was the first known Slavic state. The capital was located at Karnburg, near Klagenfurt in present-day Austria. It is unknown if Valuk's bloodline was continued in that of the later Dukes of Carantania.

== Slavs Independent Territories under Valuk ==
At the latest after the weakening of Pannonian Avars in 626 (if not already in 623), Slavs in the Eastern Alps joined the Slavic tribal association of the Duke Samo. In 630, the Franks were also involved with the Lombards, which were bordered in Carantania as the territory in Samo's tribal union.

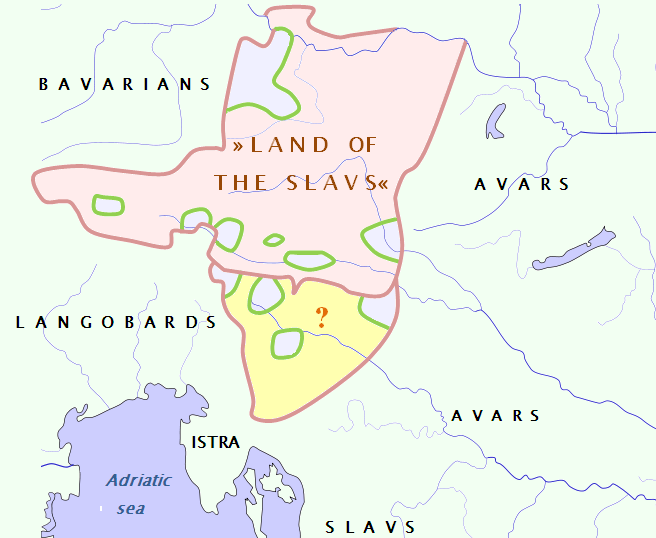
The greatest possible extent of Valuk's "Land of the Slavs". For southern territory (yellow) there is no information. At the time of Valuk there were some aboriginal population concentrations in the Eastern Alps (light blue).

At that time, according to Fredegarii Chronicon in Pannonia, there was a dispute between the Avars and the Bulgarians, which resulted in the 9,000 Bulgarians under the leadership of their prince Alcioka first resorted to seek help from the Bavarians, but when they were almost all slaughtered on the orders of the Frankish King Dagobert. Approximately 700 survivors of the Bulgarians came to the land of the Slavs (marca Vinedorum) to the ruler of that place, the Duke Valuk (Wallucum ducem Vinedorum). Most likely, this is precisely the one Alcioka who went to Friuli with her escort in 662. The event with the Bulgarians reveals that Carantania was not subordinate to the Franks, the Lombards, nor the Avars at that time.

It is also possible that Valuk was the prince of the Alpine Slavs, where Arnefrit, the son of Friulian Duke Lupa, sought political asylum and alliance. In describing Arnefrit's withdrawal to the Slavs, Paul the Deacon claimed that he fled to the Slavs in Karnuntum, mistakenly called Karantanum (Carnuntum, quod corrupte vocifier Carantanum), which could mean that the land began to be called Carantania under Valuk's rule.

For the territory of the later Carniola, it was not known whether it was part of Samo's tribal union (within the Valuk authorities or separately), or was still under the jurisdiction of the Avars or no one else's territory.

== See also ==
- Carantania
- Slavs
- Avars
- Langobards
