= Lia Fáil =

Standing stone on the Hill of Tara, Ireland

- Speaking Stone, Coronation Stone
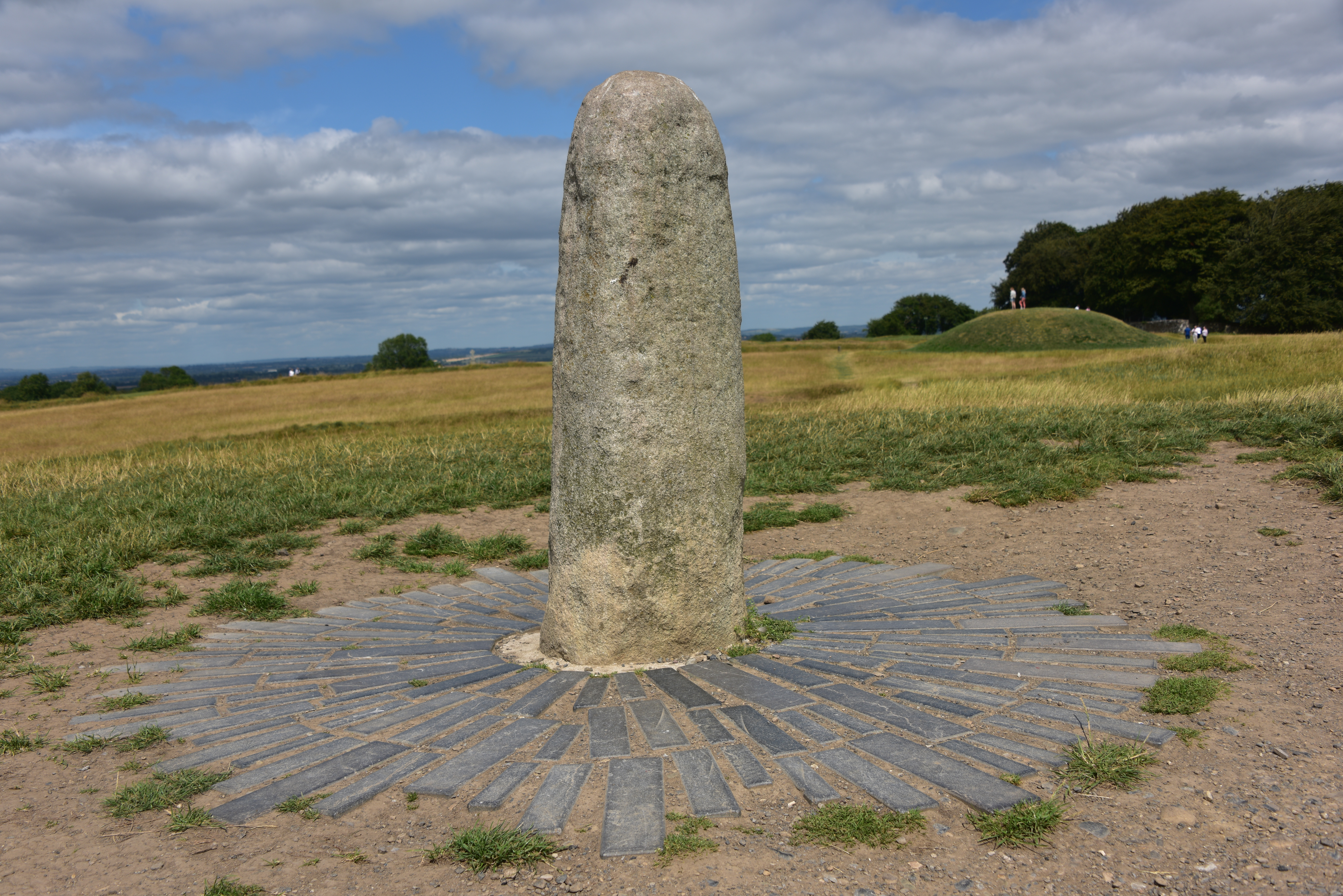
- The stone currently standing on the Hill of Tara identified with the historical Lia Fáil

- Location within Ireland
- 53°34′43.1″N 6°36′43.7″W
- Type: Standing stone
- Etymology: Irish: Stone of Fál (Ireland/destiny)
- Location: Hill of Tara

History
- Original use: coronation stone

Site notes
- Elevation: 155 metres (509 ft)
- Height: 1 metre (3 ft 3 in)

The Fál (Irish: [fˠaːlˠ]) or Lia Fáil (Irish: [ˌl̠ʲiə ˈfˠaːlʲ]; "Stone of Fál") is a stone at the Inauguration Mound (Irish: an Forrad) on the Hill of Tara in County Meath, Ireland, which served as the coronation stone for the King of Tara and hence High King of Ireland. It is also known as the Stone of Destiny or Speaking Stone. According to legend, all of the kings of Ireland were crowned on the stone up to Muirchertach mac Ercae, c. 500 AD.

== Geology ==
Archibald Geikie noted resemblances to the calcareous red sandstone of which the Stone of Scone is composed; it is not currently believed the stones originated from connected quarry sites. It has also been identified as a whitish granitoid.

== Mythical origin ==
There are several different, and conflicting, legends in Irish mythology describing how the Lia Fáil is said to have been brought to Ireland. The Lebor Gabala, dating to the eleventh century, states that it was brought in antiquity by the semi-divine race known as the Tuatha Dé Danann. The Tuatha Dé Danann had travelled to the "Northern Isles" where they learned many skills and magic in its four cities Falias, Gorias, Murias and Findias. From there they travelled to Ireland bringing with them a treasure from each city – the four legendary treasures of Ireland. From Falias came the Lia Fáil. The other three treasures are the Claíomh Solais or Sword of Light, the Sleá Bua or Spear of Lugh and the Coire Dagdae or The Dagda's Cauldron.

Some Scottish chroniclers, such as John of Fordun and Hector Boece from the thirteenth century, treat the Lia Fáil the same as the Stone of Scone in Scotland. According to this account, the Lia Fáil left Tara in AD 500 when the High King of Ireland Murtagh MacEirc loaned it to his great-uncle, Fergus (later known as Fergus the Great) for the latter's coronation in Scotland. Fergus's sub-kingdom, Dalriada, had by this time expanded to include the north-east part of Ulster and parts of western Scotland. Not long after Fergus's coronation in Scotland, he and his inner circle were caught in a freak storm off the County Antrim coast in which all perished. The stone remained in Scotland, which is why Murtagh MacEirc is recorded in history as the last Irish King to be crowned on it.

However, historian William Forbes Skene commented: "It is somewhat remarkable that while the Scottish legend brings the stone at Scone from Ireland, the Irish legend brings the stone at Tara from Scotland."

The Dindsenchas, recording a tradition from early Irish literature and echoing ancient legends, reports that Lia Fáil would roar in the presence of a false king pretending to hold dominion in Ireland.

== Mythical powers ==
The Lia Fáil was thought to be magical: when the rightful High King of Ireland put his feet on it, the stone was said to roar in joy. The stone is also credited with the power to rejuvenate the king and also to endow him with a long reign. According to Lebor Gabála Érenn, Cúchulainn split it with his sword when it failed to cry out under his protégé, Lugaid Riab nDerg — from then on it never cried out again, except under Conn of the Hundred Battles and according to legend, at the coronation of Brian Boru in 1002.

== Inis Fáil ==
The stone was originally called Fál, a word of obscure meaning; the Dictionary of the Irish Language distinguishes this word from five homonyms in Old Irish and Middle Irish, whose meanings cluster respectively around "barrier", "chieftain", "abundance", "learning", and "valley". It is from this stone the Tuatha Dé Danann metonymically named Ireland Inis Fáil ("island of Fál"), and from this Fál became an ancient name for Ireland. The stone in turn by reverse metonymy was named Lia Fáil "[Standing] Stone of Ireland". Inisfail appears as a synonym for Erin in some Irish romantic and nationalist poetry in English in the nineteenth and early twentieth centuries; Aubrey Thomas de Vere's 1863 poem Inisfail is an example.

The fianna [warrior-band] of the Fenian Cycle, though usually simply "the Fianna", was sometimes poetically called Fianna Fáil "Fianna of Ireland". Hence Fianna Fáil was a sobriquet for modern Irish nationalist militias; for the Irish Volunteers it was an Irish-language alternative to Óglaigh na hÉireann, and the initials "FF" used on their cap badge have been retained on that of the current Irish Army. In Amhrán na bhFiann ["The Soldier's Song"], the republic's national anthem, the opening "Soldiers are We" is translated "Sinne Fianna Fáil". For similar reasons, Fianna Fáil is the name of a major political party in the republic. The identification of the Lia Fáil with the Scottish "Stone of Destiny" has fostered the idea that "Fá[i]l" means "[of] Destiny", and hence Fianna Fáil is rendered "Soldiers of Destiny".

== Vandalism ==
Sometime in June 2012, the stone was damaged by a hammer in 11 places. It was vandalised again in May 2014 when green and red paint was poured on the stone covering at least 50% of its surface.

The stone was vandalised again c. 6–7 February 2023 when the word "Fake" was spray painted on the stone.

== See also ==
- List of individual rocks
- Stone of Scone – Ancient Scottish coronation artefact
- Coronation Stone, Kingston upon Thames – Stone in Kingston, United Kingdom
- Stones of Mora – Historic location in Knivsta, Sweden
- Prince's Stone – Ceremonial notion used in medieval Austria and Slovenia
- Sword in the stone (King Arthur) – Legendary sword of King Arthur
- Blarney Stone – Limestone block in Blarney Castle
