= Zollfeld =

Slightly ascending plain in Carinthia, Austria

Coordinates: 46°43′20″N 14°22′11″E

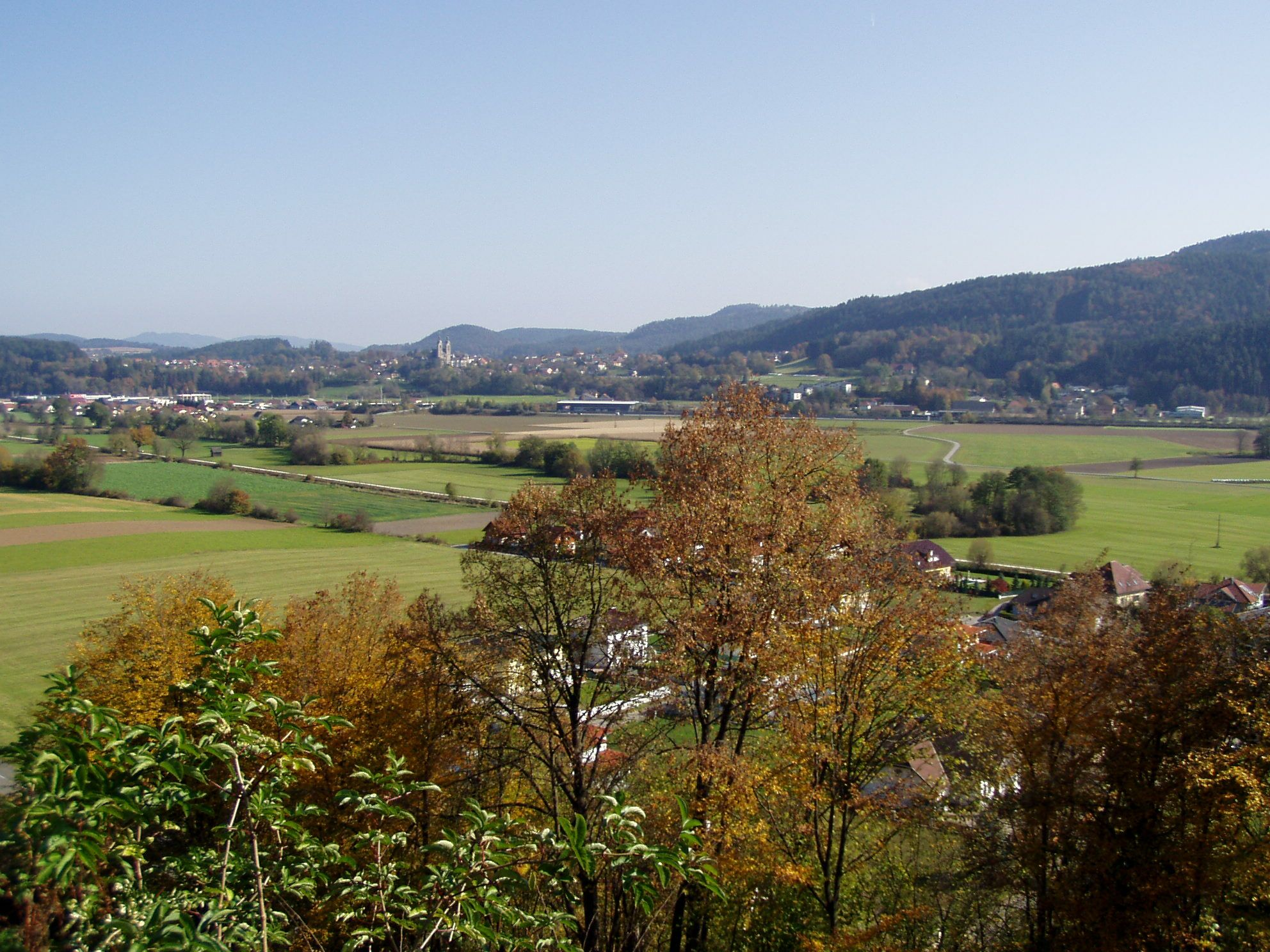
View from Karnburg to Maria Saal

Zollfeld (Slovene: Gosposvetsko polje) is a slightly ascending plain in Carinthia, Austria with interspersed small woods, hills, and swamps. It is one of the oldest cultural landscapes in the East Alpine region.

== Geography ==
It is from 400 m (1,300 ft) to 2 km (1.2 mi) wide and about 18 km (11 mi) long, with an elevation between 450 and 455 m (1,476 and 1,493 ft) above sea level. It is situated in the larger Klagenfurt Basin of the Central Eastern Alps and extends along the Glan River from north of Klagenfurt to Sankt Veit an der Glan.

The plain is surrounded by four prominent peaks of the basin: the Ulrichsberg (1,022 m; 3,353 ft) in the south and the Magdalensberg (1,059 m; 3,474 ft) in the east as well as the Gößeberg (1,171 m; 3,842 ft) and the Lorenziberg in the north (971 m; 3,186 ft). Since about 500 years the mountains are stops on the annual Vierbergelauf procession celebrated on second Friday after Easter.

== History ==
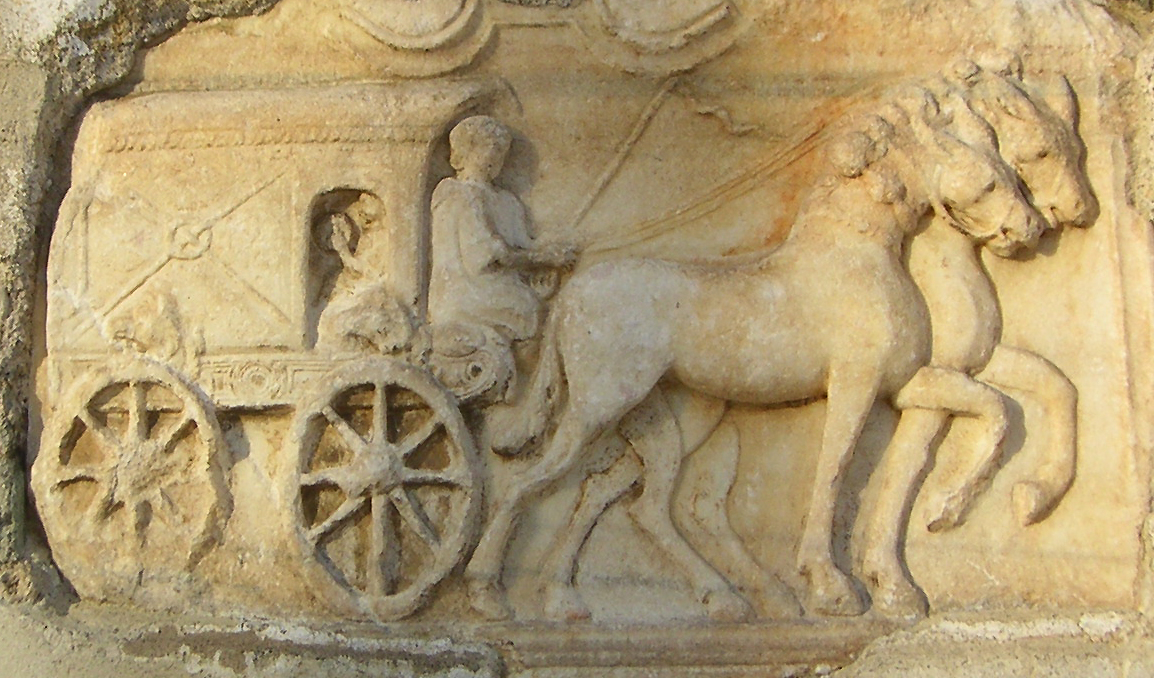
Roman stone relief on the outer wall of the Church of Our Lady in Maria Saal

The oldest archaeological findings at Magdalensberg originate from the time of Hallstatt culture (8th to 6th centuries BCE). The area was the cultural and political centre of the Celtic kingdom and the later Roman province of Noricum, when under the rule of Emperor Claudius (41–54 AD) the city of Virunum was established as the province's capital, replacing - or maybe identical with - ancient Noreia. Since 2015 archaeological excavations have been carried out in the Roman cemetery in Virunum.

Following the Slavic settlement of the Eastern Alps about 600, the Karnburg (Krnski grad) fortress became the center of the Principality of Carantania, which about 740 was vassalized by Duke Odilo of Bavaria. With Bavaria, a part of the Carolingian Empire under Charlemagne from 788 onwards, a Kaiserpfalz at Karnburg was erected about 830. It remained the administrative center after the Duchy of Carinthia had been split off Bavaria in 976.

Inside the castle was a meeting place, where the Prince's Stone, the base of an ancient Roman Ionic column, stood and the Dukes of Carantania were installed. Near Maria Saal stands the Duke's Chair, where the newly installed dukes distributed their land among the vassals.

== See also ==
- Modestus (Apostle of Carinthia)
- Carantanians
- History of Slovenia
