= John of Viktring =

Austrian political advisor (c. 1270–1347)

John of Viktring (German: Johann von Viktring, Slovene: Janez Vetrinjski, Latin: Iohannis abbatis Victorensis; c. 1270 – 12 November 1347) was a late medieval chronicler and political advisor to Duke Henry of Carinthia.

== Life ==
Nothing is known of John's early life; of aristocratic birth, he possibly was of Lorraine descendance from the area of Metz. Having received a thorough spiritual education, he was elected abbot of the Cistercian monastery of Viktring in Carinthia on 15 February 1312. His high-mindedness and distinction opened him the doors to the Carinthian nobility and administration. John served as a chaplain and confidential secretary to the Meinhardiner duke Henry of Carinthia; in 1330, he accompanied King John of Bohemia on his campaign from Tyrolean Innsbruck across the Brenner Pass to Trent, presumably at the behest of the Carinthian duke.

Upon the Henry's death in 1335, John journeyed to the Austrian city of Linz at the request of Henry's daughter, Countess Margaret of Tyrol, in order to defend her claims to her father's estates before the Wittelsbach emperor Louis IV. Though Margaret could rely on her marriage with Prince John Henry of Luxembourg, the mission ultimately failed when the two Habsburg dukes, Albert II of Austria and his brother Otto the Merry, took possession of the contested Carinthian lands in her stead. The Austrian dukes thereby also became the lords of Viktring Abbey, they too learned to value the abbot's abilities and consulted him in all important government matters. John frequently stayed at their residence in Vienna as a confidential secretary until 1341, when he withdrew to the quiet of his Carinthian monastery to write a history of his own time. He also appeared as chaplain of Patriarch Bertram of Aquileia.

== Work ==
His chronicle, which he titled Liber certarum historiarum ("Book of certain histories"), has come down to us in various forms. In its original form, as preserved in a manuscript at the Bavarian State Library in Munich, it is a history of the Austrian and Carinthian lands from the accession of the last Babenberg duke Frederick II the Warlike in 1230 until 1341, dedicated to the Habsburg duke Albert II. The information on the earlier period was based on the rhyming chronicle of the medieval historian Ottokar from Gaal and the works by Martin of Opava, while the rest was written from data which he himself had collected during his many travels.

In 1342, he enlarged the book into a chronicle of the Holy Roman Empire, which began with the year 1217. He rewrote it again in 1343, this time beginning with the Carolingian period. This revised work has only reached us through a later compilation, the so-called Chronicon Anonymi Leobiensis. John ranks among the most important chroniclers of the late Middle Ages. He was a very learned man and well acquainted with the Latin and Greek poets. His narrative is lucid, and his judgments on the events of his own time show great impartiality. He is influenced by Otto of Freising (d. 1158), and condemns in his chronicle the anti-Roman policy of Emperor Louis.
