= Carantania =

Early medieval Slavic principality

Carantania *Korǫtanъ
- 658–828
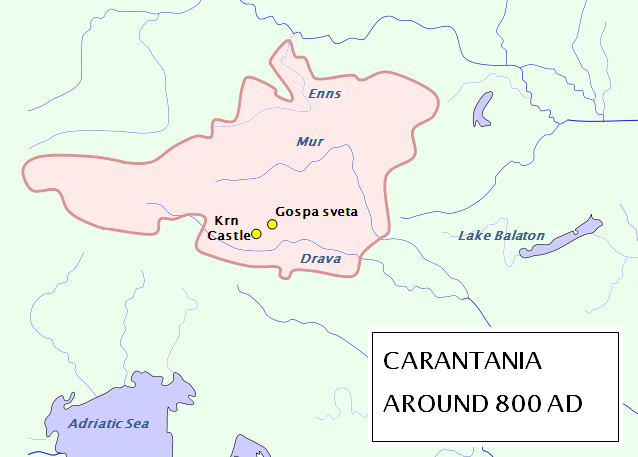
- Capital: Karnburg
- Common languages: Proto-Slavic
- Government: Monarchy
- Historical era: Early Middle Ages
  - Death of King Samo: 658
  - Tributary to Franks: 745
  - Integration to Franks: 828
Preceded by	Succeeded by
Samo's Empire	Francia
- Today part of: Austria; Slovenia

Carantania, also known as Carentania (Slovene: Karantanija, German: Karantanien, in Old Slavic *Korǫtanъ), was a Slavic, more precisely old Slovenian principality that emerged in the second half of the 7th century, in the territory of present-day southern Austria and north-eastern Slovenia. Since the middle of the 8th century, it was allied with Bavaria against the Avars, and consequently became a vassal state of the Frankish Empire. In the same time, Christianisation of Carantanian Slavs was initiated, mainly through missionary activities of the Archdiocese of Salzburg. By 828, internal autonomy of the principality was abolished, and the entire Carantanian territory was gradually integrated into the East Frankish administrative system, based on counties and marches. Carantania thus became the predecessor of the March of Carinthia, created within the Carolingian Empire by 889.

== Origin of the name ==
The name Carantania is of proto-Slavic origin. Paul the Deacon mentions Slavs in "Carnuntum, which is erroneously called Carantanum" (Carnuntum, quod corrupte vocitant Carantanum).

A possible etymological explanation is that it may have been formed from a toponymic base carant- which ultimately derives from pre-Indo-European root *karra meaning 'rock', or that it is of Celtic origin and derived from *karant- meaning 'friend, ally'. Its Slavic name *korǫtanъ was adopted from the Latin *carantanum. The toponym Carinthia (Slovene: Koroška < Proto-Slavic *korǫt’ьsko) is also claimed to be etymologically related, deriving from pre-Slavic *carantia. In Slovene, Korotan remained a synonym for both Carinthia and Carantania well into the 19th and early 20th century. Nowadays, Karantanija is used for the early medieval Slavic principality, while Koroška for the duchy and region that emerged from it from the 10th century onward.

The name, like most toponyms beginning with *Kar(n)- in this area of Europe, are in turn most likely linked to the pre-Roman tribe of the Carni that once populated the eastern Alps.

== Territory ==
Carantania's capital was most likely Karnburg (Slovene: Krnski grad) in the Zollfeld Field (Slovene: Gosposvetsko polje), north of modern Klagenfurt (Slovene: Celovec). The principality was centered in the area of modern Carinthia, and included territories of modern Styria, most of today's East Tyrol and of the Puster Valley, the Lungau and Ennspongau regions of Salzburg, and parts of southern Upper Austria and Lower Austria. It most probably also included the territory of the modern Slovenian province of Carinthia. The few existing historical sources distinguish between two separate Slavic principalities in the Eastern Alpine area: Carantania and Carniola. The latter, which appears in historical records dating from the late 8th century, was situated in the central part of modern Slovenia. It was (at least by name) the predecessor of the later Duchy of Carniola.

The borders of the later Carantania state, which was under the feudal overlordship of the Carolingians, and its successor (the March of Carinthia, 826–976), as well as of the later Duchy of Carinthia (from 976), extended beyond historical Carantania.

== History ==
Carantania within Frankish Empire (AD 788–843)

In the 4th century Chur became the seat of the first Christian bishopric north to the Alps. Despite a legend assigning its foundation to an alleged Briton king, St. Lucius, the first known bishop is one Asinio in AD 451.

In the aftermath of the Gothic War (535-554), the Byzantine Empire found itself unable to prevent the Germanic tribe of the Lombards from invading Italy and founding a kingdom there. The territory left behind by the Lombards in Pannonia was subsequently settled by Slavs (with the help of their Avar overlords) in the last decades of the 6th century. In 588 they reached the area of the Upper Sava River and in 591 they arrived in the Upper Drava region, where they soon fought the Bavarians under Duke Tassilo I. In 592 the Bavarians won, but three years later in 595 the Slavic-Avar army gained victory and thus consolidated the boundary between the Frankish and the Avar territories. By that time, today's East Tyrol and Carinthia came to be referred to in historical sources as Provincia Sclaborum (the Country of Slavs).

In the 6th century Chur was also conquered by the Franks.

Between the 9th and 10th centuries, the Alpine Slavs, who are reckoned to be among the ancestors of present-day Slovenes, settled the eastern areas of the Friuli region. They settled in the easternmost mountainous areas of Friuli, known as the Friulian Slavia, as well as the Karst Plateau and the area north and south from Gorizia.

Slavic settlement in the Eastern Alps region is assumed to be connected to the collapse of local dioceses in the late 6th century, a change in population and material culture, and most importantly, in the establishment of a Slavic language group in the area. The territory settled by Slavs, however, was also inhabited by the remains of the indigenous Romanized population, which preserved Christianity.

Slavs in both the Eastern Alps and the Pannonian region are assumed to be originally subject to Avar rulers (kagans). After Avar rule weakened around 610, a relatively independent March of the Slavs (marca Vinedorum), governed by a duke, emerged in southern Carinthia in the early 7th century. Historical sources mention Valuk as the duke of Slavs (Wallux dux Winedorum).

The year 626 brought an end to Avar dominance over Slavs, as the Avars were defeated at Constantinople. In 658 Samo died and his Tribal Union disintegrated. A smaller part of the original March of the Slavs, centred north of modern Klagenfurt, preserved independence and came to be known as Carantania. The name Carantania itself begins to appear in historical sources soon after 660. The first clear indication of a specific ethnic identity and political organisation may be recognised in the geographical term Carantanum which Paul the Deacon used in reference to the year 664, and in connection to which he also mentioned a specific Slavic people (gens Sclavorum) living there.

When about 740 Prince Boruth asked the Bavarian duke Odilo for help against the pressing danger posed by Avar tribes from the east, Carantania lost its independence. Boruth's successors had to accept the overlordship of Bavaria and the semifeudal Frankish kingdom, ruled by Charlemagne from 771 to 814. Charlemagne also put an end to the invasions undertaken by the Avars, who had regained eastern parts of Carantania between 745 and 795.

In 828, Carantania finally became a margraviate of the Carolingian Empire. The local princes were deposed for following the anti-Frankish rebellion of Ljudevit Posavski, the prince of Slavs of Lower Pannonia, and replaced by a Germanic (primarily Bavarian) ascendancy. By the 843 Treaty of Verdun, it passed into the hands of Louis the German (804–876) who, according to the Annales Fuldenses (863), gave the title of a "prefect of the Carantanians" (praelatus Carantanis) to his eldest son Carloman. In 887 Arnulf of Carinthia (850–899), a grandson of Louis the German, assumed his title of King of the East Franks and became the first Duke of Carinthia.

The city of Chur suffered several invasions by the Magyars in 925-926, when the cathedral was destroyed. In the area of Carantania 954–979 exist Slavic parish "pagus Crouuati"(Croats) which is mentioned in royal charters, ruled by count Hartwig in the name of the German king.

== The Ducal Inauguration ==
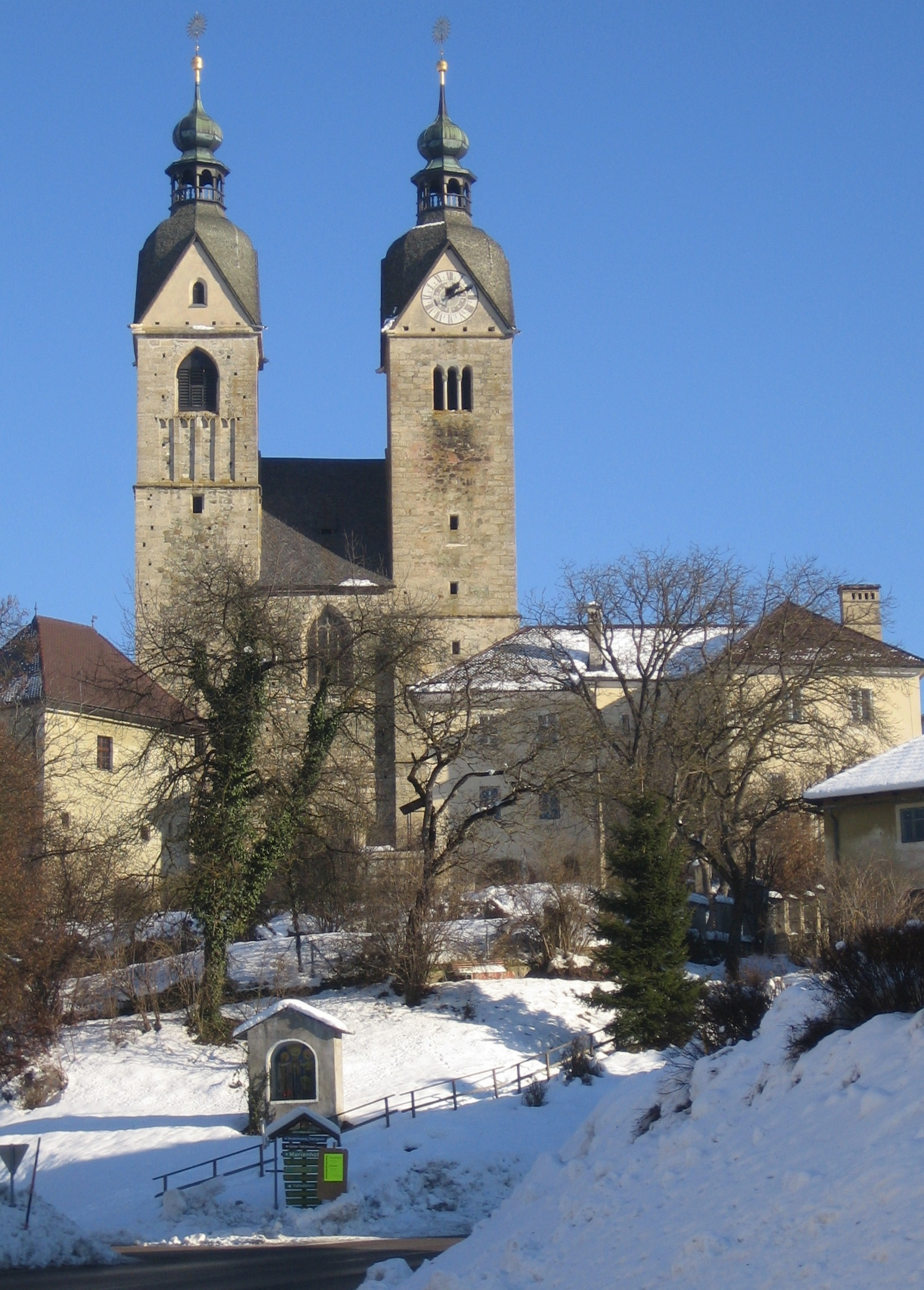
Church of Maria Saal (Gospa Sveta)

The principality of Carantania is particularly notable for the ancient ritual of installing Carantanian dukes (or princes, both an approximate translation of Knez/Knyaz/Fürst), a practice that continued after Carantania was incorporated into the later Duchy of Carinthia. It was last performed in 1414, when the Habsburg Ernest the Iron was enthroned as Duke of Carinthia. The ritual took place on the Prince's Stone (Slovene Knežji kamen, German Fürstenstein), an ancient Roman column capital near Krnski grad (now Karnburg) and was performed in Slovene by a free peasant who, selected by his peers, in the name of the people of the land questioned the new Prince about his integrity and reminded him of his duties. Later, when the Duchy of Carinthia had fallen to the Habsburgs, the idea that it was actually the people from whom the Duke of Carinthia received his legitimation was the basis of the Habsburgs' claim to the unique title of Archduke.

The coronation of Carinthian Dukes consisted of three parts: first, a ritual in Slovene was performed at the Prince's Stone; then a mass was held at the cathedral of Maria Saal (Gospa Sveta); and subsequently, a ceremony took place at the Duke's Chair (Vojvodski stol, German: Herzogsstuhl), where the new Duke swore an oath in German and where he also received the homage of the estates. The Duke's Chair is located at Zollfeld valley, north of Klagenfurt in modern Carinthia, Austria.

The ceremony was first described by the chronicler John of Viktring on the occasion of the coronation of Meinhard II of Tyrol in 1286. It is also mentioned in Jean Bodin's book Six livres de la République in 1576.

== Mentions in late medieval literature ==
Chronicle of Fredegar mentions Carantania as Sclauvinia, Dante Alighieri (1265–1321) mentions Carantania as Chiarentana. The same name was also used by Florentines, such as the poet Fazio degli Uberti (circa 1309–1367), the famous chronicler Giovanni Villani (c. 1275–1348), and Giovanni Boccaccio (1313–1375), who wrote that the Brenta River rises from the mountains of Carantania, a land in the Alps dividing Italy from Germany.

== Ethnic and social structure ==
The population of ancient Carantania had a polyethnic structure. The core stratum was represented by two groups of Slavs who had settled in the Eastern Alps region in 6th century and are the ancestors of the present-day Slovenes and partially also Austrians. Other ethnic strong element included the descendants of the Romanised aboriginal peoples (Noricans), which is attestable on the basis of a recent DNA analysis and a number of place names. It is also possible that traces of Dulebes, Avars, Braničevci, Croats and the Germanic peoples were present among Carantanians.

== Language ==
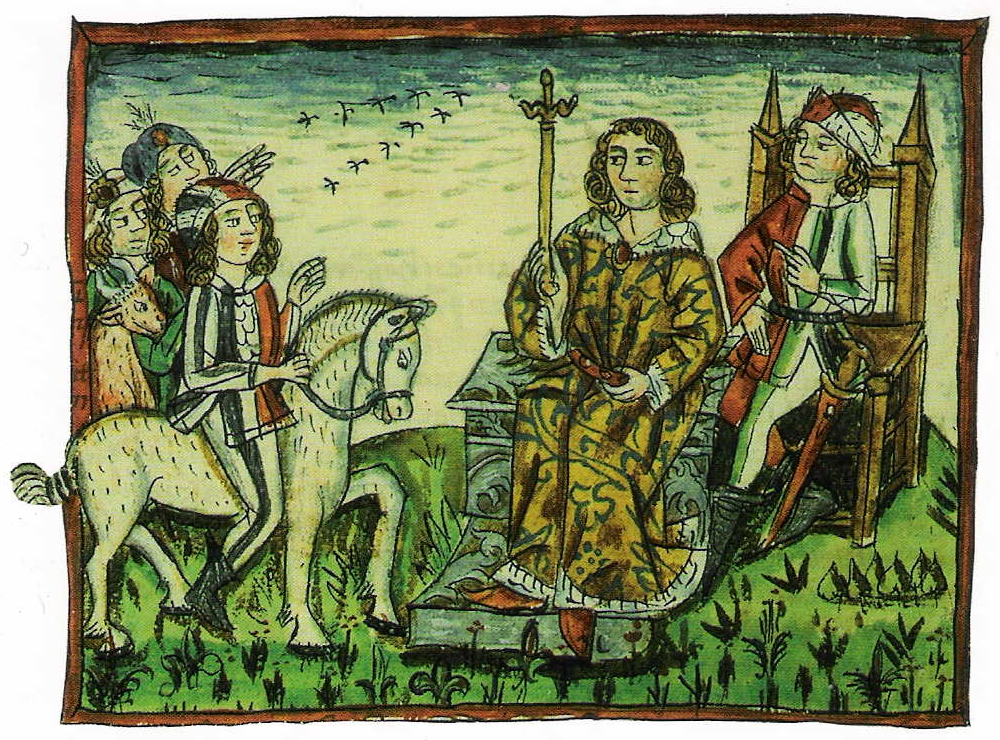
The installation of the Dukes of Carinthia according to a Medieval chronicle

In its early stages, the language of Carantanian Slavs was essentially Proto-Slavic. In Slovenian linguistic literature and reference books it is sometimes provisionally termed Alpine Slavic (alpska slovanščina). Its Proto-Slavic character can be deduced from language contacts of Alpine Slavs with the remainders of the Romanised aboriginal population, later also with Bavarians. The adopted Pre-Slavic placenames and river names and their subsequent phonetic development in Alpine Slavic, as well as Bavarian records of Alpine Slavic names, shed light on the characteristics of the Alpine Slavic language.

From the 9th century onwards, Alpine Slavic underwent a series of gradual changes and innovations which were characteristic of South Slavic languages. By roughly the 13th century, these developments gave rise to the Slovene language.

== See also ==
- Prince's Stone
- Duke's Chair
- Modestus (Apostle of Carantania)
- Black panther (symbol)
- Timeline of Slovenian history

== Sources ==
- Bowlus, Charles R. (1995). Franks, Moravians, and Magyars: The Struggle for the Middle Danube, 788-907. Philadelphia: University of Pennsylvania Press. ISBN 978-0-8122-3276-9.
- Goldberg, Eric J. (2006). Struggle for Empire: Kingship and Conflict under Louis the German, 817-876. Ithaca, NY: Cornell University Press.
- Luthar, Oto, ed. (2008). The Land Between: A History of Slovenia. Frankfurt am Main: Peter Lang.
- McKitterick, Rosamond (1983). The Frankish Kingdoms Under the Carolingians, 751-987. Harlow: Longman.
- MacLean, Simon (2003). Kingship and Politics in the Late Ninth Century: Charles the Fat and the end of the Carolingian Empire. New York: Cambridge University Press.
- McKitterick, Rosamond (1983). The Frankish Kingdoms Under the Carolingians, 751-987. Harlow: Longman.
- Reuter, Timothy, ed. (1992). The Annals of Fulda. Manchester: Manchester University Press.
- Reuter, Timothy (2013) [1991]. Germany in the Early Middle Ages c. 800–1056. London and New York: Routledge.
- Schutz, Herbert (2004). The Carolingians in Central Europe, Their History, Arts, and Architecture: A Cultural History of Central Europe, 750-900. Leiden-Boston: Brill.
- Štih, Peter (2010). The Middle Ages between the Eastern Alps and the Northern Adriatic: Select Papers on Slovene Historiography and Medieval History. Leiden-Boston: Brill.
- Wilson, Peter (2016). Heart of Europe: A History of the Holy Roman Empire. Cambridge: Harvard University Press.
