= Virgil of Salzburg =

Irish churchman, astronomer and bishop

Saint Virgil of Salzburg
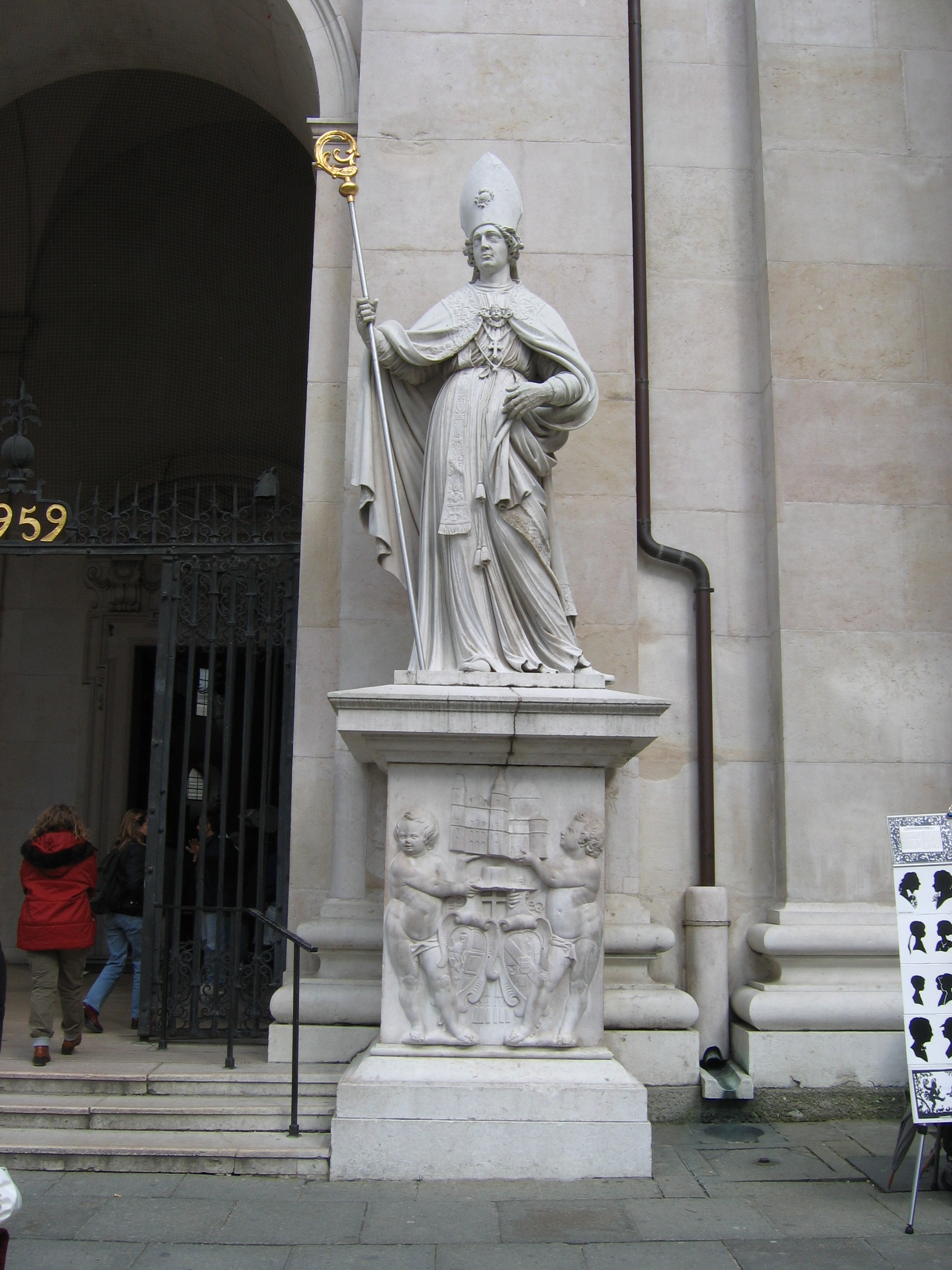
- Statue of Saint Virgil at the Salzburg Cathedral

Bishop Apostle of Carinthia
- Born: c. 700; Ireland
- Died: 27 November 784; Salzburg, Avar March, Frankish Empire
- Venerated in: Catholic Church; Eastern Orthodox Church
- Canonized: 1233 by Pope Gregory IX
- Feast: 27 November

Virgil (c. 700– 27 November 784), also spelled Vergil, Vergilius, Virgilius, Feirgil or Fearghal, was an Irish priest and early astronomer. He left Ireland around 745, intending to visit the Holy Land; but, like many of his countrymen, he settled in Francia. Virgil served as abbot of Aghaboe, bishop of Ossory and later bishop of Salzburg. He was called "the Apostle of Carinthia" and "the geometer".

== Biography ==
He originated from a noble family of Ireland, where his name was Feirgil or Fearghal, and is said to have been a descendant of Niall of the Nine Hostages. Feirgil was probably educated at the Iona monastery.

In Annals of the Four Masters and Annals of Ulster, he is referenced as the Abbot of Aghaboe, in County Laois, where he was known as "the Geometer" because of his knowledge of geography.

Around 745, he left Ireland, intending to visit the Holy Land; but, like many of his countrymen, who seemed to have adopted this practice as a work of piety, he settled down in France, where he was received with great favour by Pippin the Younger, who was then Mayor of the Palace under Childeric III of Franconia. He was an adviser to Pippin. He probably used a copy of the Collectio canonum Hibernensis (an Irish collection of canon law) to advise him to receive royal unction in 751, to assist his recognition as king Pippin III after the deposition of Childeric. After spending two years at Cressy, near Compiègne, he went to Bavaria, at the invitation of Duke Odilo, where he founded the monastery of Chiemsee, and within a year or two, was made Abbot of St Peter's Abbey at Salzburg. Among his notable accomplishments was the conversion of the Alpine Slavs to Christianity; he also sent missionaries to Hungary.

As Abbot of St Peter's, he clashed with Saint Boniface. A priest having, through ignorance, conferred the Sacrament of Baptism using, in place of the correct formula, the words "Baptizo te in nomine patria et filia et spiritus sancti" (instead of "Baptizo te in nomine patris et filii et spiritus sancti"), Vergilius held that the sacrament had been validly conferred, but Boniface complained to Pope Zachary. The latter, however, decided in favour of Virgil. Later on, Boniface accused Virgil of spreading discord between himself and Duke Odilo of Bavaria and of teaching a doctrine in regard to men descended not from Adam, which was "contrary to the Scriptures". Pope Zachary's decision in this case was that "if it shall be clearly established that he professes belief in another world and other people existing beneath the earth, or in [another] sun and moon there, thou art to hold a council, and deprive him of his sacerdotal rank, and expel him from the church."

The treatise in which Virgil expounded his doctrine no longer exists. Two things, however, are certain: first, that there was involved the problem of original sin and the universality of redemption; secondly, that Virgil succeeded in freeing himself from the charge of teaching a doctrine contrary to Scripture. It is likely that Boniface, already biased against Virgil because of the preceding case, misunderstood him, taking it for granted, perhaps, that if there are antipodes, the "other race of men" are not descendants of Adam and were not redeemed by Christ.

After the martyrdom of Boniface, Virgil was made Bishop of Salzburg in 766 or 767 and laboured successfully for the upbuilding of his diocese as well as for the spread of Christianity in neighbouring heathen countries, especially in Carinthia.

== Veneration ==
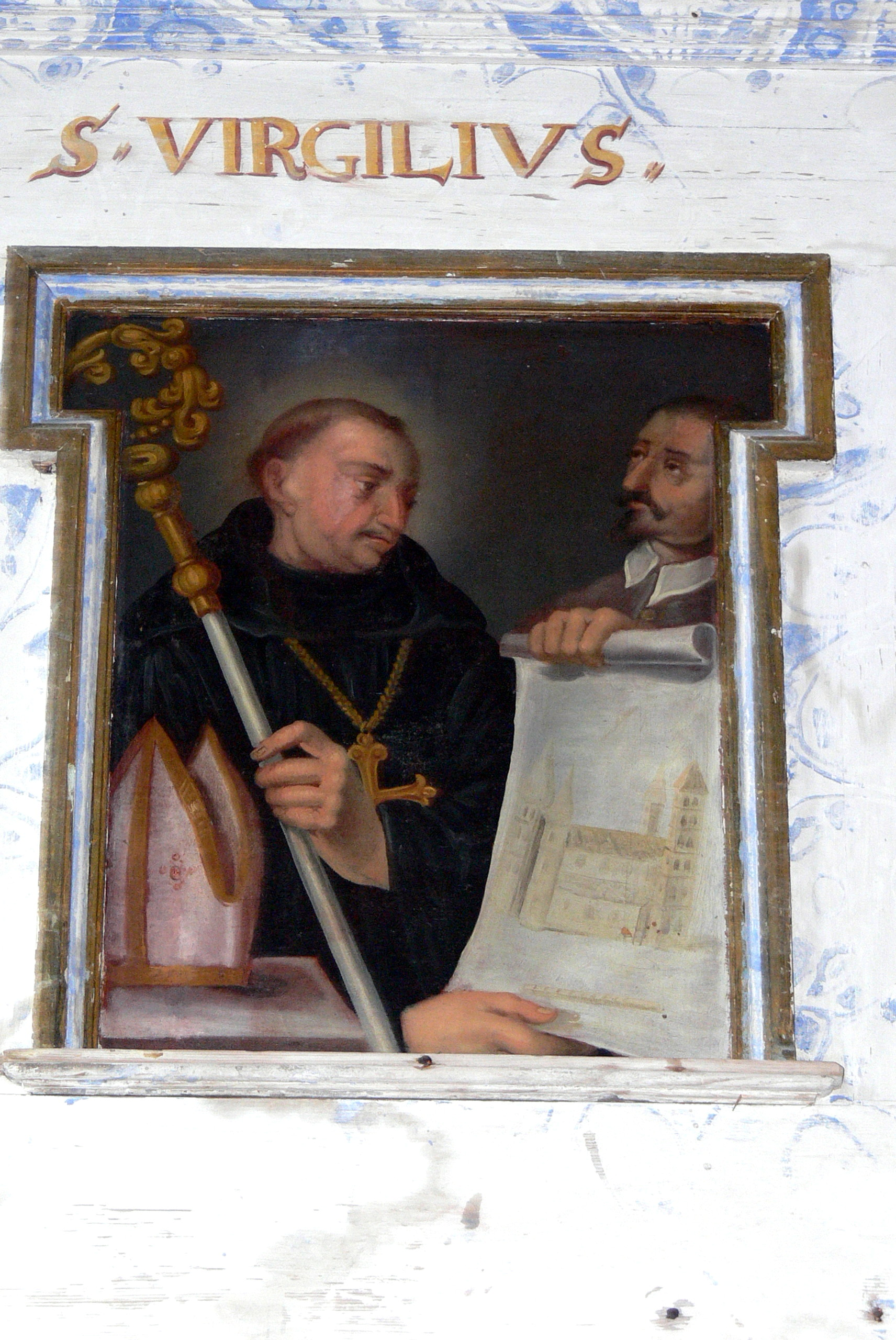

He is venerated as a saint in both the Catholic Church and the Eastern Orthodox Church. In 1233, he was formally canonized by Pope Gregory IX.

His doctrine that the earth is a sphere was derived from the teaching of ancient geographers, and his belief in the existence of the antipodes was probably influenced by the accounts which the ancient Irish voyagers gave of their journeys. This, at least, is the opinion of Rettberg (Kirchengesch. Deutschlands, II, 236).

=== Dedications ===
Aside from being personally associated with Aghaboe Abbey and Salzburg Cathedral, a number of parishes around the world are dedicated to him, mostly being founded by small populations of far-flung Irish Catholics, like himself.

There is a church dedicated to him in Broad Channel, Queens, New York, which merged with another parish in 2008. A parish in Morris Plains, New Jersey, is also dedicated to him. Fittingly for this Irish geometer who predicted antipodes, several churches in the Southern Hemisphere are dedicated to him. St Virgil's College in Hobart, Tasmania is named for him. There was a St Virgilius Church in Balclutha, New Zealand designed by Francis Petre which moved and was re-dedicated to Mary MacKillop, however the new chapel remains dedicated to Virgilius.

=== Art and culture ===
A large marble statue of him stands outside the doors of Salzburg Cathedral. A stained-glass window of St Virgil contemplating the antipodes sits in St John's College, University of Sydney. Sebastian Stief painted him amidst Salzburg's construction, Alec Szolomiak painted him, as did Jan Toorop, and Dhiraja McBryde. Yalumba, Australia's oldest family-owned winery, produces a Viognier named Virgilius.

== See also ==
- Modestus (Apostle of Carantania)
- Saint Vergilius of Salzburg, patron saint archive

== Sources ==
- Laistner, M.L.W. Thought and Letters in Western Europe: A.D. 500 to 900, 2nd. ed. Ithaca: Cornell Univ. Pr., 1955. ISBN 0-8014-9037-5
