= Prince's Stone =

Ceremonial notion used in medieval Austria and Slovenia

Coordinates: 46.6249°N 14.3057°E

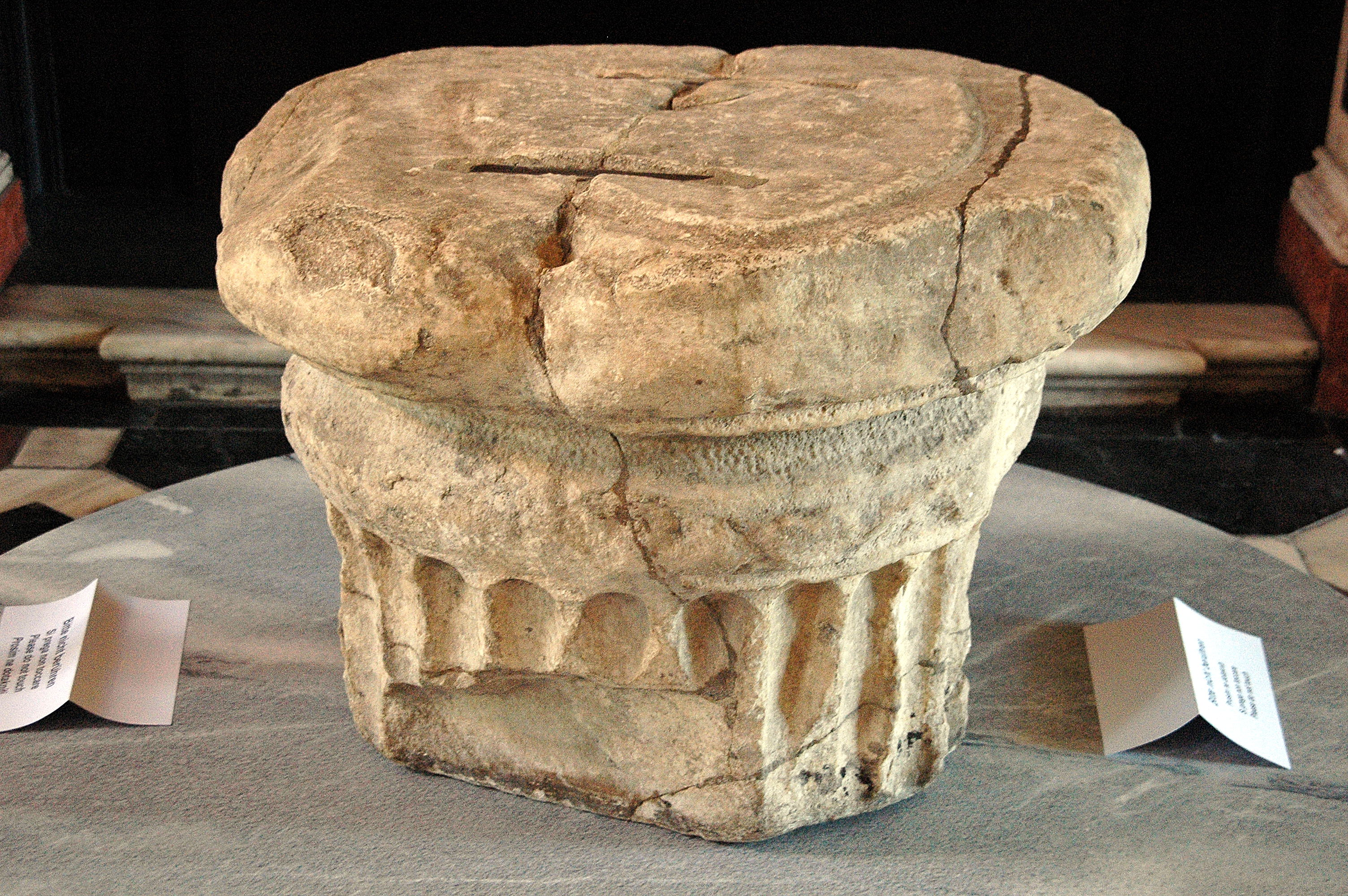
The Prince's Stone at the Klagenfurt Landhaus

The Prince's Stone (German: Fürstenstein, Slovene: knežji kamen) is the reversed base of an ancient Ionic column that played an important role in the ceremony surrounding the installation of the princes of Carantania in the Early Middle Ages. After the incorporation into the Frankish Empire, the procedure, held in Slovene, was continued as the first part of the coronation of the Dukes of Carinthia. It was followed by a mass at Maria Saal cathedral and the installation at the Duke's chair, where he swore an oath in German and received the homage of the estates.

== The stone ==
The column probably originates from the nearby Roman city of Virunum, established as capital of the Noricum province under the reign of Emperor Claudius (AD 41–54). During the Middle Ages, the coat of arms of the Duchy of Carinthia was engraved on its top surface. Until 1862, when it was transferred to the Landhaus provincial assembly at Klagenfurt, it stood northwest of the Kaiserpfalz of Karnburg (Slovene: Krnski grad) in the Zollfeld plain, built by Emperor Arnulf of Carinthia.

== Democratic notion ==
The ceremony involving this notion has been confirmed by several sources, including the medieval reports and the writing of Pope Pius II in 1509. It was also described by Jean Bodin in his Treatise on Republican Government (1576) as "unrivaled in the entire world", although there is evidence that the Stone of Scone in Scotland and the Lia Fáil in Ireland were used in a similar fashion. An echo of the notion of a stone of kingship is present in European literature in the form of the Arthurian motif of the Siege Perilous – itself derived, ultimately, from ancient Irish conceptions of kingship.

=== Democratic procedure ===
The peasant, sitting on the Stone, was representing the people during the ceremony and he had to ask in Slovene: "Who is he, that comes forward?" Those sitting around him would reply: "He is the prince of the land".

"Is he an upright judge seeking the well-being of the country; is he freeborn and deserving? Is he a foster and defender of the Christian faith?" the representative of the people had to ask them. "He is and he will be", they would reply.

"By what right can he displace me from this my seat?" he had to ask them and they would reply: "He will pay you sixty denarii and he will give you your home free and without tribute".

The peasant then had to give the duke a gentle blow on the cheek (un petit soufflet), after which the duke was allowed to draw his sword, mount the Stone and turn full circle, so as to face ritually in all directions. While this was being done, all had to sing the Slovenian Kyrie and praise God for the gift of a new ruler, in accordance with His divine will. Finally, the ruler had to be placed on horseback and conducted around the Stone three times.

== Later allusions and influences ==
The first mention of a sedes Karinthani ducatus in the course of the installation of Herman II of Sponheim in 1161 possibly referred to the Prince's Stone. The ceremony was explicitly described about 1341 by the chronicler John of Viktring in his liber certarum historiarum on the occasion of the coronation of Meinhard II of Gorizia-Tyrol in 1286: when the duke-to-be approached, he found a free peasant sitting on the stone. Not before Meinhard had assured him he was worthy to accede to the throne and would be a just ruler would the peasant vacate his position.

In Thomas Jefferson's personal copy of Bodin's book, Jefferson's initials appear next to the description of the ceremony. A myth has developed that the description inspired Jefferson during the creation of the United States Constitution. A plaque in Cleveland recognizes that this ritual may have influenced the American Revolution.

However, there is no direct evidence for this theory and it has been dismissed by mainstream scholars.

The partition of Carinthia after World War I made the Prince's Stone a part of the common and therefore disputed Carantanian heritage. When in 2005 the Slovenian government decided to depict the Prince's Stone on the national side of the Slovenian 2-cent coin, it caused some consternation in Austria. In 2006, Carinthian governor Jörg Haider (Austria) had the stone that since 1905 had been displayed at the Carinthian State Museum, transferred again to the Heraldic Hall at the Klagenfurt Landhaus.

== See also ==
- Duke's Chair
- Stone of Scone
- Lia Fail
- Conn of the Hundred Battles
- Stones of Mora
- Coronation Stone, Kingston upon Thames
- List of individual rocks
