= Duke's Chair =

Stone chair in Austria

Coordinates: 46°41′27″N 14°20′47″E

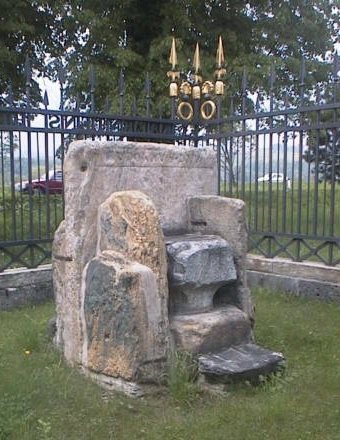
The Western seat of the Duke's Chair

The Duke's Chair, also known as the Duke's Seat (German: Herzogstuhl, Slovene: vojvodski prestol or vojvodski stol), is a medieval stone seat dating from the ninth century and located at the Zollfeld plain near Maria Saal, north of Klagenfurt in the Austrian state of Carinthia.

== History ==
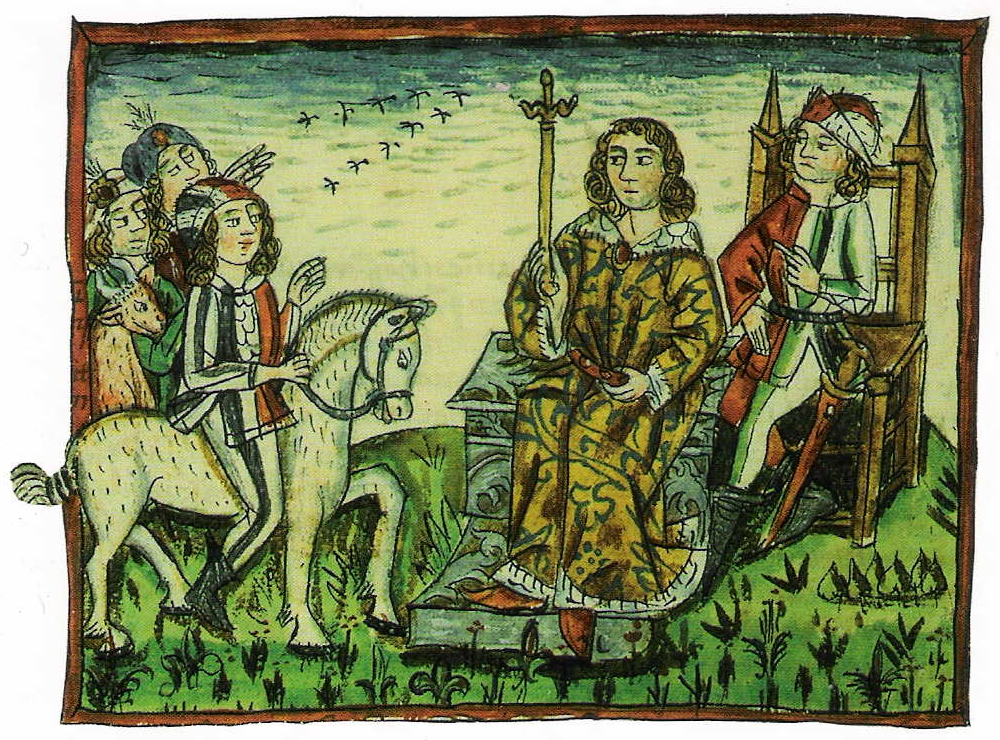
Depiction by Leopold von Wien, Österreichische Chronik von den 95 Herrschaften, 14th century

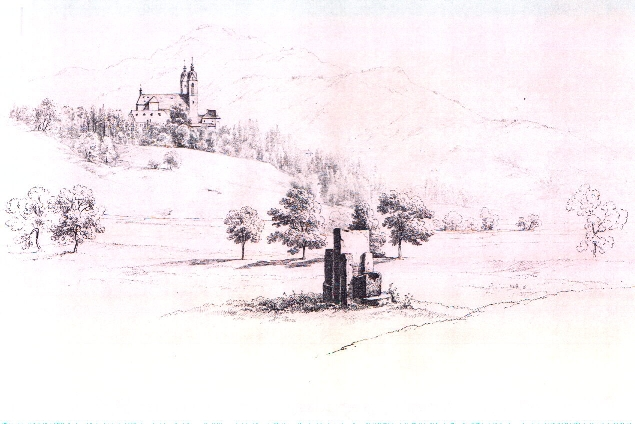
1860 Drawing of the "Duke's Chair" with the Cathedral of Maria Saal in the background

The Duke's Chair, made mainly of Roman gravestones from nearby Virunum, actually consists of two stone seats, whose backrests are attached to each other. The larger seat, facing to the east, was reserved for the dukes, the other one, slightly older and facing to the west, for the counts palatine of the Meinhardiner dynasty.

Together with the Prince's Stone, it played an important role during the installation of the Dukes of Carinthia in a ceremony that may date back to the early medieval principality of Carantania. The chair was first mentioned as sedes Karinthani ducatus on the occasion of the installation of Duke Herman II of Spanheim in 1161. Here the newly installed duke had to swear an oath in German and received the homage of the estates. It was the last part of a series of rituals which consisted of the ducal installation on the Prince's Stone (performed in Slovene) and of a mass, which was held at the church of Maria Saal.

The last installation took place in 1651, though the Duke, Ferdinand of Habsburg, the son of Emperor Ferdinand III, did not take part in person, but was represented by a personal deputy.

== See also ==
- Prince's Stone
- Carantania
- March of Carinthia
- Duchy of Carinthia

== Sources ==
- Luthar, Oto, ed. (2008). The Land Between: A History of Slovenia. Frankfurt am Main: Peter Lang.
- Štih, Peter (2010). The Middle Ages between the Eastern Alps and the Northern Adriatic: Select Papers on Slovene Historiography and Medieval History. Leiden-Boston: Brill.
