= Maria Saal =

Place in Carinthia, Austria

- Municipality
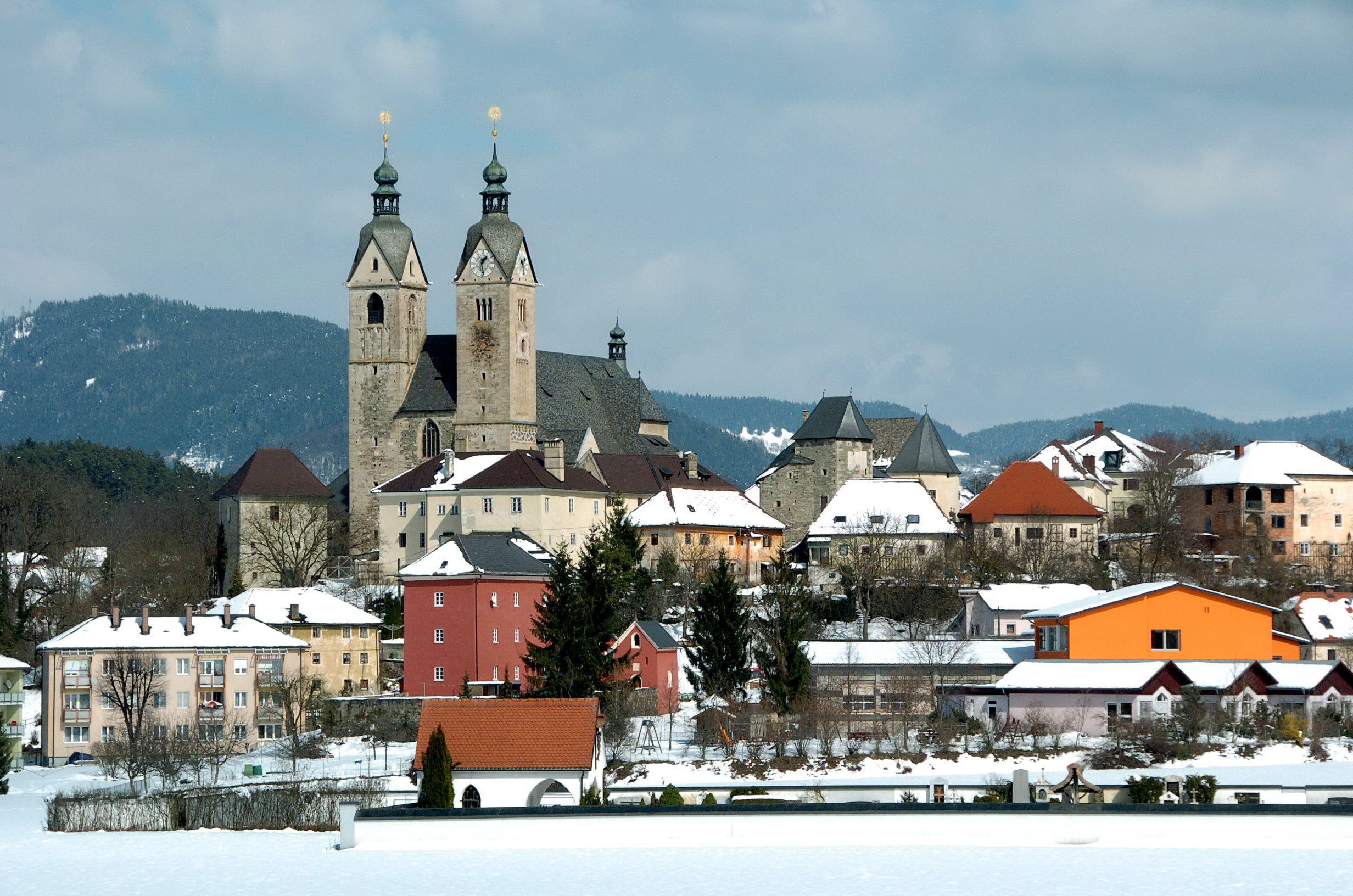

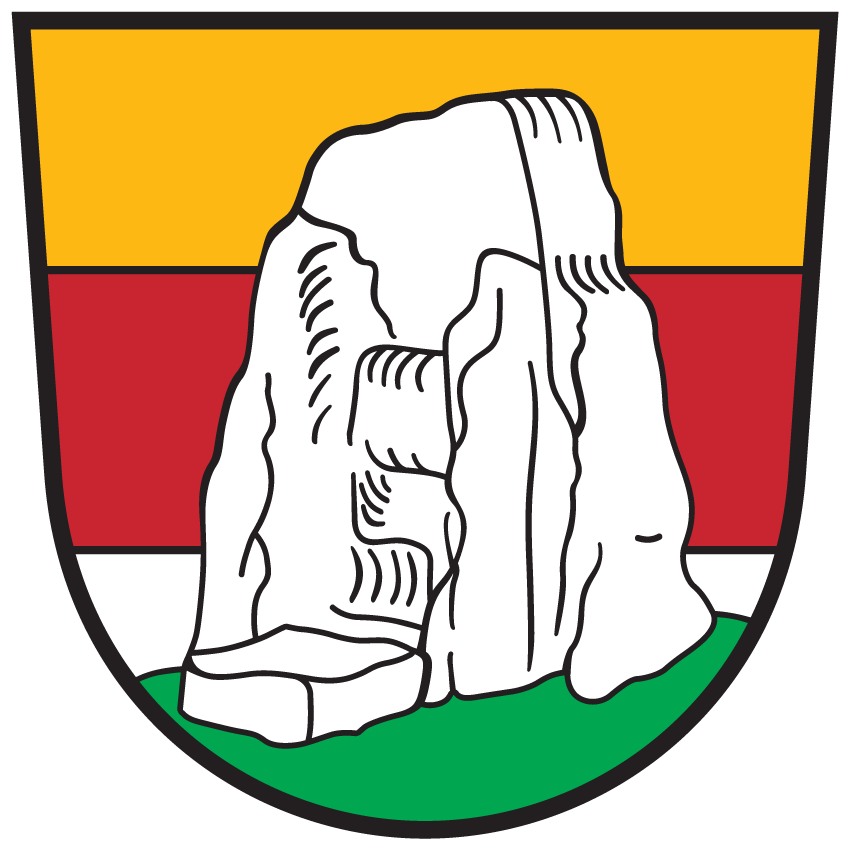
- Coat of arms

- Location of Maria Saal within Carinthia Location of Maria Saal within Austria
- Coordinates: 46°41′N 14°21′E
- Country: Austria
- State: Carinthia
- District: Klagenfurt-Land

Government
  - Mayor: Anton Schmidt (ÖVP)

Area
  - Total: 34.82 km^{2} (13.44 sq mi)
- Elevation: 505 m (1,657 ft)

Population (2018-01-01)
  - Total: 3,835
  - Density: 110.1/km^{2} (285.3/sq mi)
- Time zone: UTC+1 (CET)
  - Summer (DST): UTC+2 (CEST)
- Postal code: 9063
- Area code: 04223
- Website: www.mariasaal.at

Maria Saal (Slovene: Gospa Sveta) is a market town in the district of Klagenfurt-Land in the Austrian state of Carinthia. It is located in the east of the historic Zollfeld plain (Gosposvetsko polje), the wide valley of the Glan River. The municipality includes the cadastral communes of Kading, Karnburg, Möderndorf, Possau and St. Michael am Zollfeld.

== History ==
The Zollfeld valley has been a cultural and political centre since Celtic tribes settled in the region. When their kingdom of Noricum had become a province of the Roman Empire in 15 BCE, Emperor Claudius had the city of Virunum erected as the province's capital at the foot of the nearby Magdalensberg, where on the hilltop a splendid Celtic settlement had already existed. Virunum became a centre of early Christianity in the early 4th century as the see of a bishop under the jurisdiction of the Patriarch of Aquileia.

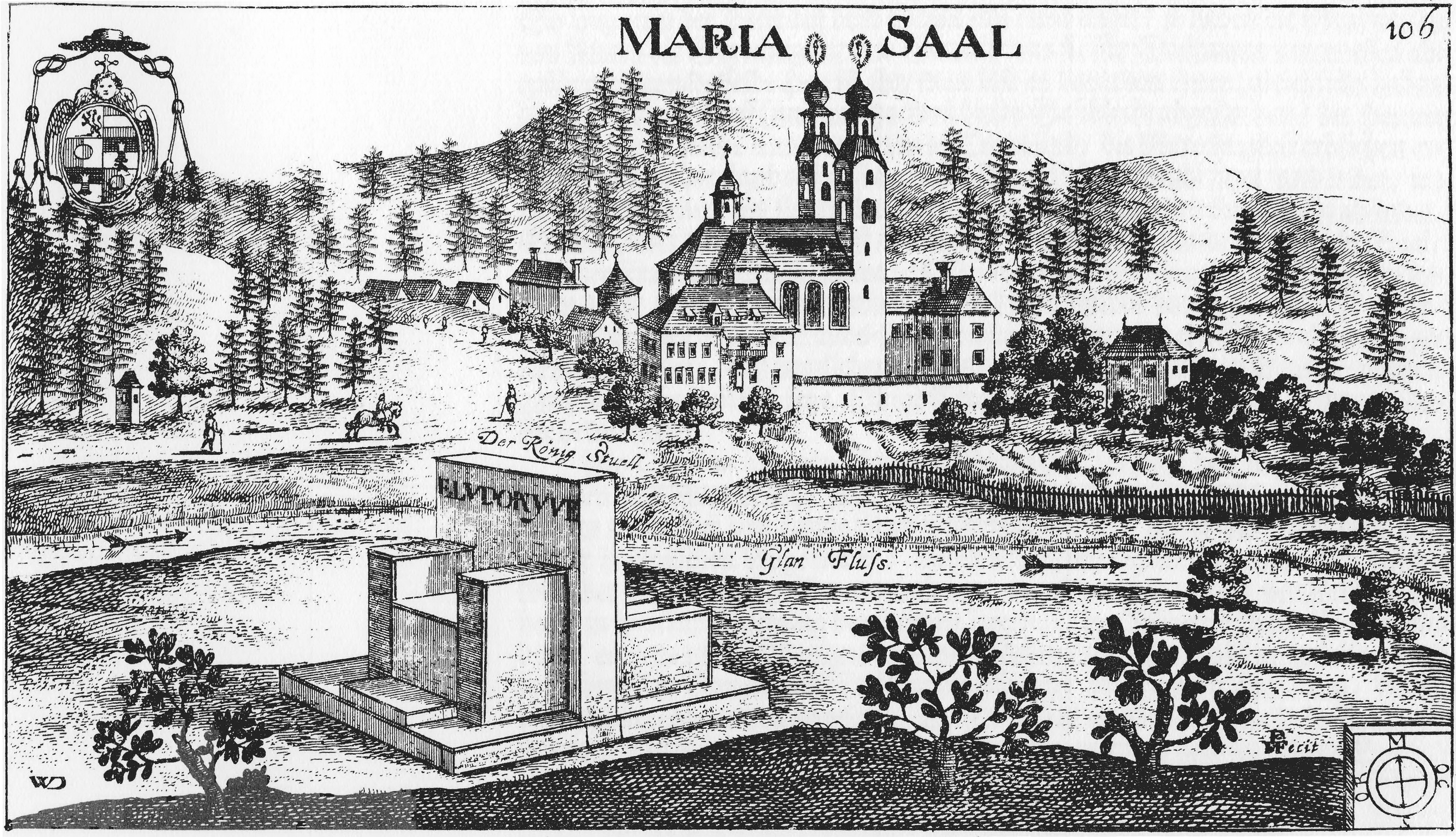
Maria Saal with Duke's Chair, engraving by Johann Weikhard von Valvasor, 1680

When pagan Slavic tribes entered the region around 590, they settled in a place called Krnski Grad (German: Karnburg), close to Virunum, which became the administrative centre of their Carantania principality. Here the ritual of installing the princes took place on the Prince's Stone, the base of an ancient Roman Ionic column originating from Virunum. The ceremony was continued in the local dialect of the Slovene language long into the Middle Ages. After Duke Odilo of Bavaria about 743 had vassalised the Carantanian prince Borut, the ritual was supplemented by a German-language ceremony at the Duke's Chair, a double throne made of stone, which can still be seen near Maria Saal.

The second Christianization of the area began at about 767 under Bishop Vergilius of Salzburg. His missionary Modestus had the first church of the Assumption of Mary built at Maria Saal (Slovene: Gospa Sveta), across the plain from Karnburg (Slovene: Krnski grad), as the centre of his missionary activities. S. Maria ad Carantanum was first mentioned in an 860 deed, probably a smallish wooden church that has vanished long since. From this bishop's church - by no means a cathedral in the modern sense of the word - Christianity was spread all over Carantania.

After Charlemagne had finally deposed the Bavarian duke Tassilo III in 787, Karnburg remained the political capital when Carantania became a march of the Frankish realm. The East Frankish king Arnulf of Carinthia († 899), probably born in nearby Moosburg, built a Kaiserpfalz here. In 893 he appointed the Bavarian count Luitpold Margrave in the March of Carinthia, his Luitpolding descendants also ruled as Bavarian dukes.

When Emperor Emperor Otto II deposed Duke Henry II the Quarrelsome and finally separated Carinthia from Bavaria in 976, Karnburg also was the political centre of the duchy, a function that later was taken over by the ducal town of Sankt Veit an der Glan, a few miles to the north, and finally in the 16th century by the City of Klagenfurt to the south.

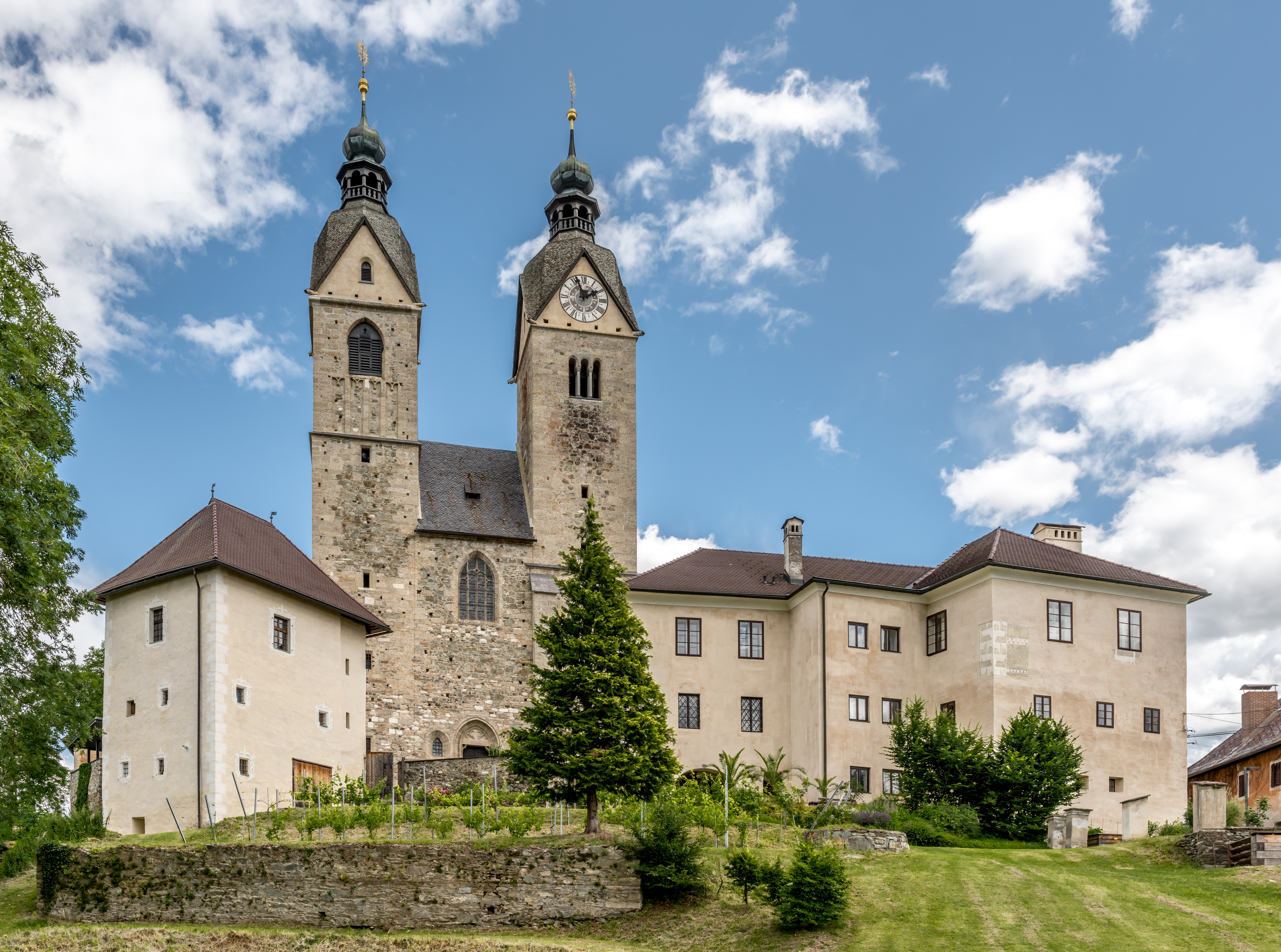
St Mary's Church

== Church ==
Maria Saal is famous for its large pilgrimage church in seemingly transitional style from Romanesque to Gothic. Not much remains from the Romanesque church that had replaced the bishop's church of Modestus and his successors. The present fortified church building goes back to the mid-15th century and is in high Gothic style, actually reconstructed within 20 years after the big fire of 1669.

In view of the church's predecessor, which, as the church of Bishop Modestus, was the religious center of Carinthia in the 8th century and practically an episcopal see until 945, the present church is popularly still called a "Dom", i.e. "cathedral", which it, of course, has never been. The Roman sarcophagus beneath the church is said to contain the remains of Modestus. Still today, however, it is a major pilgrimage site for both German- and Slovene-speaking Carinthians and even for Slovene nationals.

=== Church Bells ===
#	Foundry	Cast year	Mass	Tone	Diameter	Name
1.	Mathias Landsmann	1687	6,608 kg (14,568 lb)	Fis°	222 cm (87 in)	Maria Saalerin
2.	Grassmayr	1925	2,098 kg (4,625 lb)	cis'		
3.	Grassmayr	1972	1,310 kg (2,888 lb)	dis'		
4.	Lorenz Pez	1670	~1,100 kg (2,425 lb)	f'		
5.	Grassmayr	1972	560 kg (1,235 lb)	gis'		
6.	Grassmayr	1972	390 kg (860 lb)	b'		

== Notable people ==
- Friedrich Welwitsch, botanist, born February 25, 1806, in Maria Saal, died October 20, 1872, in London.
- Felix Oschmautz, slalom canoeist, born July 18, 1999, in Maria Saal.

== International relations ==
=== Twin towns — Sister cities ===
Maria Saal is twinned with:

- Aquileia (Italy)
- Forgaria nel Friuli (Italy)
- Gornji Grad (Slovenia)
