= Black panther (symbol) =

Carinthian historical symbol

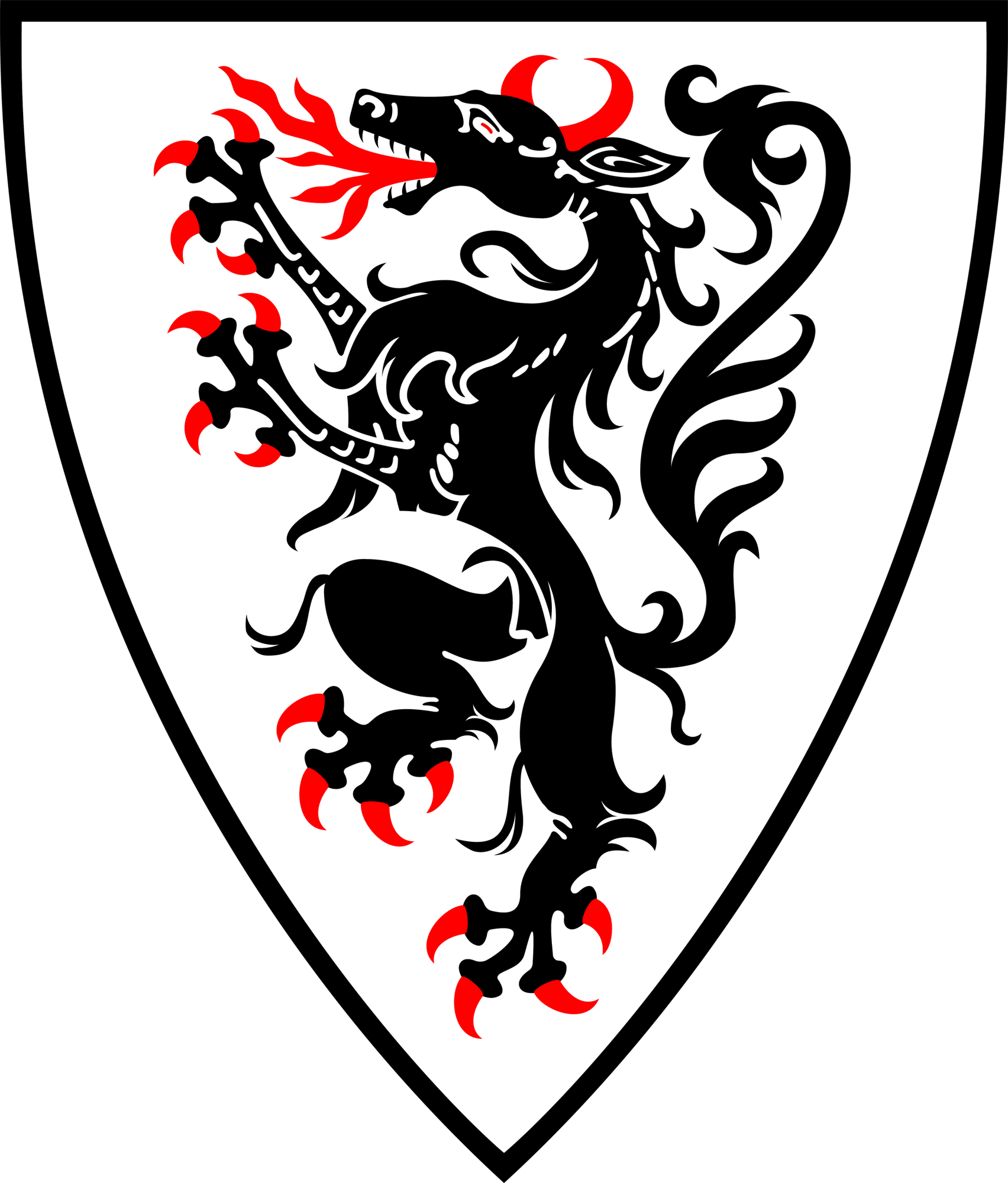
Carantanian panther

The black panther (Slovene: črni panter), also known as the Carantanian panther (karantanski panter) after the Medieval principality of Carantania, is a Carinthian historical symbol, which represents a stylized heraldic panther. As a heraldic symbol, it appeared on the coat of arms of the Carinthian Duke Herman II as well as of the Styrian Margrave Ottokar III. In this region it was most frequently imaged on various monuments and tombstones. The symbol can still be found in the coat of arms of the Austrian state of Styria, although in a white version on green background, dating back to the 13th century. The symbol is also widely used within structures of the Slovenian security forces; namely by the Slovenian Armed Forces and the Slovenian Police. Since 1991, there have been several proposals to replace the Slovenian coat of arms with the black panther.

== Origin ==
The origins of the symbol are unclear. According to the archaeologist and historian Andrej Pleterski, it appears for the first time in the coat of arms of the Sponheim family from Carinthia. The historian Peter Štih has denied any historically attested relation to symbols of Carantania. On the contrary, the economist Jožko Šavli, an adherent of the pseudohistorical autochthonist Venetic theory, believed that it originated from the Roman province of Noricum, was later adopted by Carantania, and then by the Styrian nobility.

== Later disputed usage ==
=== Symbol of Carantania ===
The symbol of the black panther in its current version was first reconstructed by the self-proclaimed historian, and high school economics teacher, Jožko Šavli in the 1980s. Šavli claimed that he had discovered several feudal families originating from the old Carantanian area that had a black panther in their dynastic coat of arms. He also claimed that he had discovered several documents mentioning the black panther as an ancient symbol of Carantania. From all these evidences he reconstructed the probable appearance of the symbol of Carolingian Carantania. These claims are not backed by any real evidence and have been refuted by academic historians.

Šavli's reconstruction soon gained some popularity among younger generations of Slovenian patriots and nationalists.

=== Symbol of Carinthia ===
Several academic historians, such as Peter Štih, have disputed the hypothesis that the black panther was the symbol of Carolingian and Ottonian Duchy of Carinthia. According to their views, all mentions which would suggest such a conclusion are vague. Furthermore, there is no direct evidence of the symbol dating to the time of the Slavic principality of Carantania.

== Current usage ==
=== Slovenia ===
Jožko Šavli's stylized version of the black panther is widely used within structures of the Slovenian security forces; namely by the Slovenian Armed Forces and the Slovenian Police. Within the Slovenian military the symbol is present on a coat of arms of the General Staff of the Slovenian Armed Forces (Slovene: Generalštab Slovenske vojske) and the United Operational Center (Slovene: Združeni operativni center), although in the latter case the symbol is reversed and is facing to the right. The black panther on a white shield is also present within the official emblem of the Medical Rescue Center of Carinthia (Slovene: Zdravstveno reševalni center Koroške). The panther is also used in the coat of arms of the special forces unit of the Slovenian Police, although in their case stylized in red and presented on a black shield. This unit is commonly referred to as the Red Panthers (Rdeči panterji).

== See also ==
- National symbols of Slovenia
- Prince's Stone
- Duke's Chair
