= Venetic theory =

Pseudohistorical interpretation of the origin of the Slovenes

The Venetic theory (Slovene: venetska teorija) is a pseudohistorical interpretation of the origin of the Slovenes that denies the Slavic settlement of the Eastern Alps in the 6th century, claiming that proto-Slovenes (also regarded as the Veneti people by the proponents of the Venetic theory) have inhabited the region since ancient times. During the 1980s and 1990s, it gained wide attention in Slovenia and the former Yugoslavia. The Venetic theory has been rejected by scholars.

A version of the Venetic theory states that most of Central Europe and portions of today's northern Turkey were originally inhabited by a single people—the Veneti—a people that were subsequently dispersed by several invasions from the North in the form of Celtic and Germanic migrations and by the push northwards of the Roman Empire. According to this variant, the Armorican Veneti, the Adriatic Veneti, the Vistula Veneti as well as portion of the Illyrians and the Veneti of northern Turkey were all related people who spoke the same or similar language. The Venetic theory also counts among the Veneti several peoples of northern Spain and northern coastal France, as well as portions of Denmark, Wales, and Ireland. In this version, most of the northern Slavs as well as the Slovenes and some Croats are the last remnant of the original European Veneti.

== Background ==
The Venetic theory was advanced in the mid-1980s by a group of Slovenian authors, notably Jožko Šavli, Matej Bor and Ivan Tomažič. In a book published in 1984, the three authors proposed an alternative view on the ethnogenesis of the Slovene people: they rejected the notion that the Slovenes were descended from Slavs that settled the area in the 6th century, claiming that the ancestors of the modern Slovenes were in fact a pre-Roman people they call Veneti (which would include the Adriatic Veneti, the Baltic Veneti, the Pannonians, the Noricans and some other peoples that traditional historiography identified either as Celts or Illyrians). According to the Venetic theory, the ancient Veneti spoke a proto-Slavic language from which modern Slovene and West Slavic languages emerged.

There were several similar antecedents to the Venetic theory. The priest Davorin Trstenjak (1817–1890) claimed that the Slovenes were ancient indigenous inhabitants of Slovenia and that Slavs had ruled Europe, Africa, and Asia in antiquity; however, he gave up these claims after he found they were scientifically untenable. The lawyer Henrik Tuma (1858–1935) declared that the Slovenes had been the first humans to settle Europe. The writer and journalist Franc Jeza (1916–1984) asserted that the Slovenes had Swedish origins.

== Premises ==
The Venetic theory is based on several different arguments. One is the traditional Germanic denomination of several Slavic peoples as Wends (Old High German: Winida > German: Wenden, Winden, Old High German: windisc > German: windisch, generally accepted to be a loan from Latin: Veneti); this tradition has remained in the archaic German name for the Sorbs (Wenden) and Slovenes (Windischen or Winden). Some medieval chroniclers also equated ancient Veneti with Slavs. The second argument on which the Venetic theory is based are supposed Slavic (proto-Slovene) toponyms found throughout Central Europe and Northern Italy; these toponyms have been studied by Šavli. The third argument is based on the ancient Venetic inscriptions found in North-Eastern Italy and in the Slovenian Littoral, which Bor interpreted as being Slavic.

== Reception ==
The Venetic theory created a great controversy in the Slovenian and Yugoslav public in the late 1980s. Several of the most prominent Slovenian historians, such as Bogo Grafenauer and Peter Štih, entered into open polemics with the creators of the Venetic theory. On the other hand, many prominent public figures publicly supported the claims advanced by the Venetic theory, among them the designer Oskar Kogoj, the poet Zorko Simčič, the mechanical engineer Lucijan Vuga, and the nationalist politician Zmago Jelinčič Plemeniti. In the 1990s, the Venetic theory gained institutional support of the so-called World Slovenian Congress, publishing much of the literature advocating the Venetic theory and organizing international symposiums. The Venetic theory has also gained support in some nationalist circles. However, the Venetic theory has been challenged by certain writers, and it has been rejected by both mainstream linguists and historians.

== See also ==
- Slovene national identity
- Black panther (symbol)
- Paleolithic continuity theory
