= Ducal hat =

Image of a Herzogshut

Ducal hat may refer to:

- Ducal hat of Liechtenstein, a former crown of the Princes of Liechtenstein
- Ducal hat of Styria
- Herzogshut, the ducal hat of a Herzog
