= National symbols of Slovenia =

Flag of Slovenia

The National symbols of Slovenia are the symbols used in Slovenia and abroad to represent the nation and its people.

== Political and ethnic symbols ==
- The formal symbols of the Republic of Slovenia: the flag, national anthem, and coat of arms (which also appears on the flag.)
- Mount Triglav has served as a national symbol since the birth of modern Slovenian national consciousness in the 19th century. A stylized rendition of its three peaks is the central device of the current coat of arms; this representation became current in the interwar era and went on to serve as the emblem of the Liberation Front, leading to its incorporation into the arms of Slovenia as a constituent of the second Yugoslavia.
- The lipa (linden or lime tree) is the national tree of Slovenia, having been traditionally planted in village commons, where assemblies, councils and other gatherings were held. A single linden leaf had served as the unofficial symbol of the late-80s drive for independence from Yugoslavia, and a wreath of linden had been featured in the communist-era coat of arms.
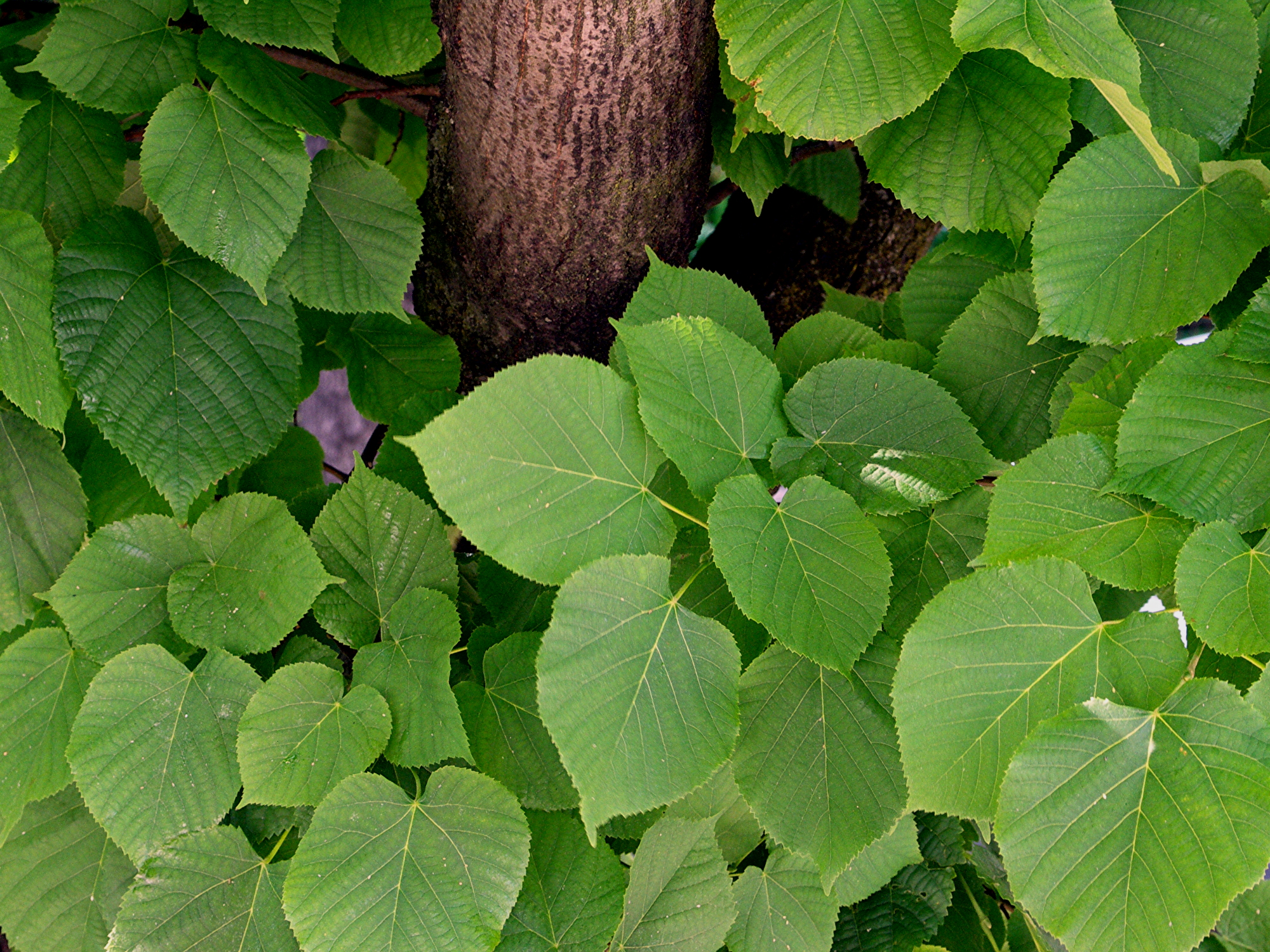
  The common heart-shaped linden leaf.
- The national flower of Slovenia is the red carnation. It is a frequent motif in traditional embroidery.
- The Slovenian national costume varies by region, but the traditional dress of Upper Carniola is often used in media to represent the national personification of Slovenia. This consists (for men) of a white linen shirt, black pants, a black embroidered vest worn over a colorful embroidered shawl, high boots, and a black hat with a red carnation. The female costume includes a black bodice-dress over a white blouse, paired with a red shawl and a characteristic high white bonnet with an embroidered headband called an avba.

== Historical symbols ==
- The Prince's Stone and the Duke's Chair of medieval Carantania are considered Slovene national symbols by Slovenes, though the affiliation is disputed by many Austrians.
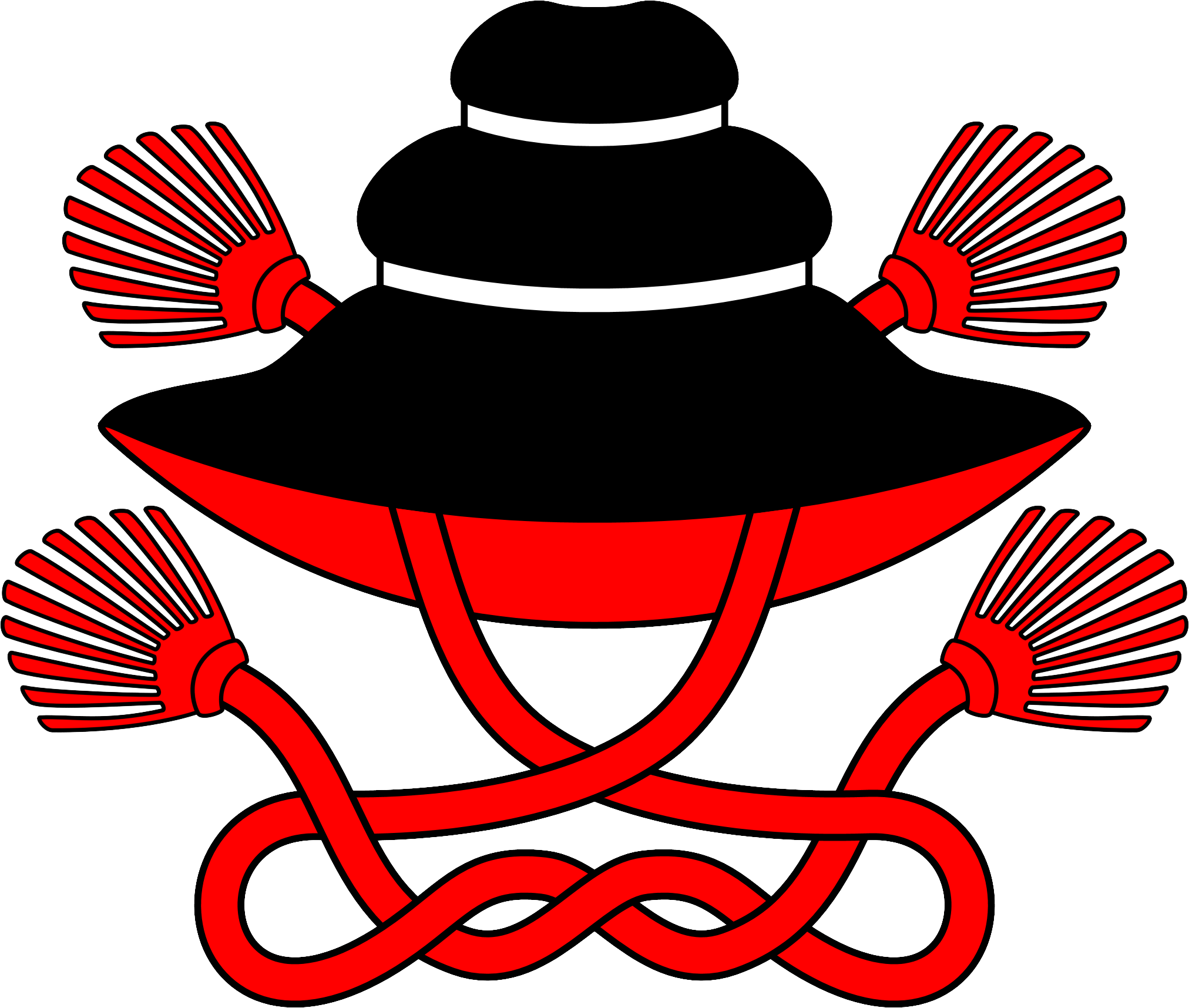
  Windic or Slovene Hat, the coat of arms of the Windic March
- Several symbols from the Middle Ages saw a revival during the runup to Slovene independence from Yugoslavia in the late 1980s. By far the most popular of these remains the Black Panther, a modern reconstruction of the supposed coat of arms of the pre-Carolingian principality of Carantania. Less well-known is the so-called Slovene Hat, the charge in the coat of arms of the medieval Slovene March. The modern use is both is largely restricted to nationalist circles.
- The coat of arms of the duchy of Carniola - a crowned blue eagle with a red-and-gold chequy crescent on its breast - had served to represent Slovenia within the interwar Kingdom of Yugoslavia. It is seldom considered a national symbol today, both for privileging Carniola over the remainder of Slovenia and for having been tainted by association with collaborationist entities during the Nazi occupation.

== Cultural symbols ==
- The works of the Protestant reformer Primož Trubar and the Romantic poet France Prešeren are considered emblematic of the Slovene national character. The latter's works include the lyrics to the national anthem.
- The Zlatorog or Goldenhorn, a magical chamois from the 19th-century folktale of the same name, inhabiting an enchanted garden near the summit of Triglav and possessing phoenix-like powers of regeneration.
- Creatures endemic to Slovenia - such as the olm, the Carniolan honey bee, and the Lipizzaner horse - are sometimes also considered to represent the Slovene national identity. (All three had appeared on Slovenia's pre-euro coinage.)
- The Sower (1907) by Ivan Grohar is the most famous Slovene painting, appearing on a Slovene euro coin.
- Distinctive local architecture includes the kozolec roofed hayrack (notably the double form known as a toplar) and the klopotec, a wind-powered noisemaker used to protect vineyards from birds.

== See also ==
- Slovenes
- Slovene Lands
- History of Slovenia
- Culture of Slovenia
- Slovene euro coins
- Black panther (symbol)
