= Hej brigade =

"Hej, brigade"

Song by Bogdana Stritar
- Language: Slovenian
- Released: September 1943
- Recorded: October 1942 – April 1943
- Venue: Near Stare Žage, Dolenjska
- Genre: March / Partisan song
- Songwriter: Matej Bor
- Composer: Franc Šturm

Hej, brigade is a Slovenian Partisan song written during World War II. It became one of the most recognizable anthems of the Slovene Partisans, symbolizing the struggle for liberation and national resistance against the Axis occupation of Slovenia.

== Background ==
The lyrics were written by Slovenian poet Matej Bor in late 1942 while he was recovering in Ljubljana after leaving the Partisan units for medical treatment. He later asked composer Franc Šturm to provide the music, which he completed in April 1943. The song was first performed by singer Bogdana Stritar in September 1943 near Stare Žage in the region of Dolenjska.

== Lyrics and versions ==
There are two versions that differ in two verses and the last stanza.

First version

Hej, brigade, hitite,
razpodite, požgite,
gnezda belih podgan, črnih psov!

Hej, mašinca, zagodi,
naj odmeva povsodi,
naš pozdrav iz svobodnih gozdov!

Hej, mašinca, zagodi,
naj odmeva povsodi,
naš pozdrav iz svobodnih gozdov!

Kje so meje, pregrade,
za slovenske brigade?
Ne, za nas ni pregrad in ne mej!

Po slemenih oblačnih
in po grapah temačnih
vse od zmage do zmage naprej!

Po slemenih oblačnih
in po grapah temačnih
vse od zmage do zmage naprej!

Pride dan, ko z Ljubljano,
zdaj nevesto prodano,
bomo šli pred svobode oltar.

Hej, od naše gostije
vrgli bomo pomije
psom, ki danes so nam gospodar.

Hej, od naše gostije
vrgli bomo pomije
psom, ki danes so nam gospodar.

Second version

Hej, brigade, hitite,
razpodite, zatrite,
požigalce slovenskih domov!,

Hej, mašinca, zagodi,
naj odmeva povsodi,
naš pozdrav iz svobodnih gozdov!

Hej, mašinca, zagodi,
naj odmeva povsodi,
naš pozdrav iz svobodnih gozdov!

Kje so meje, pregrade,
za slovenske brigade?
Ne, za nas ni pregrad in ne mej!

Po slemenih oblačnih
in po grapah temačnih
vse od zmage do zmage naprej!

Po slemenih oblačnih
in po grapah temačnih
vse od zmage do zmage naprej!

Čez poljane požgane
tja do bele Ljubljane
naša vojska prodre kot vihar!

Dokler tu so brigade,
kdor zemljo nam ukrade?
Na Slovenskem smo mi gospodar!

Dokler tu so brigade,
kdor zemljo nam ukrade?
Na Slovenskem smo mi gospodar!
