= Matej Bor =

Slovene writer and poet (1913–1993)

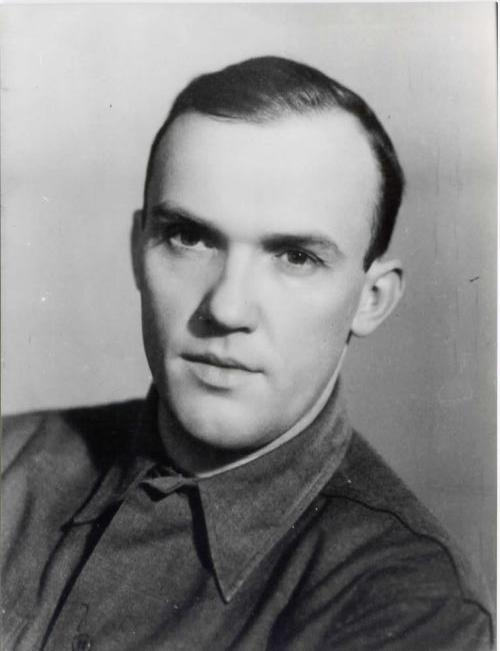
Matej Bor in the 1930s

Matej Bor was the pen name of Vladimir Pavšič (14 April 1913 – 29 September 1993), who was a Slovene poet, translator, playwright, journalist and Partisan.

== Biography ==
Matej Bor was born as Vladimir Pavšič in the village of Grgar near Gorizia, in what was then the Austrian County of Gorizia and Gradisca and is today part of Slovenia. After the Italian annexation of the Julian March in 1920, his family moved to Celje, which was then part of Yugoslavia. After finishing his studies at Celje High School, he enrolled at the University of Ljubljana, where he studied Slovene and Slavic philology. After graduating in 1937, Bor did not get a proper job due to his communist activity but worked for a short while as a journalist in Maribor. He wrote poetry and from mid-year 1940 until the German occupation in 1941, he was employed as a professor in Kočevje.

When the Axis powers invaded Yugoslavia in April 1941, he escaped from Nazi-occupied Maribor to the Italian-occupied Province of Ljubljana. In the summer of the same year he joined the Communist-led partisan resistance, where he worked in the area of culture and propaganda. During the People's Liberation War he emerged as one of the major poets of the Slovene resistance. Several of his battle songs became hugely popular. One of them, Hey, Brigades, became the unofficial anthem of Slovene partisan forces during World War II. It was during this period that he started to use the pseudonym Matej Bor, which he continued to use also after the war.

In 1944, he moved to Belgrade which had just been liberated by the Yugoslav partisans. There he worked at the Slovene section of Radio Free Yugoslavia, led by Boris Ziherl. Among his colleagues in Belgrade were the authors Igo Gruden, Edvard Kocbek and Anton Ingolič. In 1945, he moved back to Ljubljana, where he dedicated himself to writing and translating. He received the highest recognition for cultural achievements in Slovenia, the Prešeren Award in 1947 and again in 1952. In 1965, he became a member of the Slovene Academy of Sciences and Arts. In the 1960s and 1970s, he was the president of the Slovenian section of the International P.E.N.

During the period of Yugoslavia, Bor often used his influence to help dissidents or to sponsor causes challenging official policies. In the 1960s, he publicly criticized the imprisonment of the Serbian dissident writer Mihajlo Mihajlov. He was one of the founders of the environmentalist movements in Slovenia in the early 1970s. He also voiced his support for the heritage protection movement which fought against the demolishing of historic buildings in Ljubljana (such as the Kosler's Palace). In the late 1970s and early 1980s he led the platform for the rehabilitation of the victims of Stalinist show trials in Slovenia (the so-called Dachau trials of 1947). In 1984 he helped the writer Igor Torkar to publish a novel on his experiences in the Goli Otok concentration camp.

In the 1980s, Bor researched and attempted to translate Venetic inscriptions by using Slovene and its dialects. Together with Jožko Šavli and Ivan Tomažič, he advocated the theory of the Venetic origins of Slovenes, claiming that the Slovenes are the descendants of a pre-Roman Slavic-speaking people called the Veneti. None of the three men were linguists, and the theory was soon rejected by scholars, but launched a long controversy in which Bor played a prominent role.

He died in Radovljica in 1993 and was buried in Ljubljana.

== Work ==
Bor published a number of poetry collections. His first collection, called Previharimo viharje, was published during the anti-fascist resistance fight in 1942 by an underground publishing house. In 1959 he published the book Šel je popotnik skozi atomski vek (A Wanderer Went Through the Atom Age), an apocalyptic poetic reflection on the environmental disasters in the Atomic Age. The book was republished in several editions and was translated into the major European languages and contributed to Bor's popularity outside Yugoslavia.

Bor also wrote twelve plays and a number of literary works for children and youth. He was a regular contributor to publications for children and teenagers such as Ciciban, Pionir, Pionirski list, Najdihojca (a supplement of the journal Delo), Mali Rod (Klagenfurt) and The Voice of Youth (Chicago). He also wrote the screenplay for the film Vesna, which was released in 1954. He translated a number of works by Shakespeare into Slovene.

Bor is also remembered for discovering the "letter rules" of the Venetian alphabet and Venetian grammar. His claims have been rejected by scholars.

== Essential bibliography ==
=== Main poetry collections ===
- Previharimo viharje (1942)
- Pesmi (Poems, 1944)
- Pesmi (Poems, 1946)
- Bršljan nad jezom (Ivy on the Dam, 1951)
- Sled naših senc (The Trace of our Shadows, 1958)
- Podoknice tišini (Serenades to Silence, 1983)
- Sto manj en epigram (A Hundred but One Epigram, 1985)

=== Youth literature ===
- Uganke (Riddles, 1951)
- Slike in pesmi o živalih (Images and Songs About Animals, 1956)
- Sračje sodišče ali je, kar je (The Raven Court or Whatever Is Done is Done, 1961)
- Pesmi za Manjo (Songs for Manja, 1985)
- Ropotalo in ptice (The Scarecrow and Birds, 1985)
- Palčki - pihalčki (Dwarves, 1991)

=== Discography ===
- Zajček (1968)
- Partizan (1980)
- Jutri Gremo V Napad (1988)
- Hej brigade (2006) (published posthumously)

=== English translations ===
- A Wanderer Went Through the Atom Age, (London: Adam Books, 1959).
- A Wanderer in the Atom Age (Ljubljana: Državna založba Slovenije, 1970).
- An Anthology of Modern Yugoslav Poetry, edited by Janko Lavrin (London: J. Calder, 1962).

== See also ==
- Karel Destovnik
- Slovenian literature
- Venetic theory

== Sources ==
- Marija Arh, Primernost Borovih pesmi za učence od 1. do 4. razreda OŠ: diplomsko delo (Ljubljana: M. Arh, 1993), 13-15, 48-50.
- Viktor Blažič, Svinčena leta (Ljubljana: Mladinska knjiga, 1999).
- Janko Kos, Pregled slovenskega slovstva (Ljubljana: DZS, 2002), 359.
- Igor Torkar, Umiranje na obroke, preface by Matej Bor (Ljubljana: Delo, 1984).
- Ciril Zlobec, Spomin kot zgodba: avtobiografski roman (Ljubljana: Prešernova družba, 1998).
- Document on Bor's role in the Yugoslav P.E.N. at the Blinken Open Society Archives
- Biography of Igo Gruden with reference to Bor

Preceded by Meša Selimović	President of the Association of Writers of Yugoslavia; 1965-1968	Succeeded by Aco Šopov
