= Jožko Šavli =

Slovene author, self-declared historian and high school teacher (1943-2011)

Jožko Šavli (March 22, 1943 – March 11, 2011) was a Slovene author, self-declared historian and high school teacher in economic sciences from Italy.

Šavli was born in Tolmin, then part of the Kingdom of Italy (now in Slovenia). He obtained a degree in business management at the University of Ljubljana in 1967. Then he continued his studies at the Vienna School of International Trade ("Hochschule für Welthandel"), where in 1975 he obtained a doctorate in social and economic sciences with a thesis on the economic structure and regional economic development in the district of Horn in Lower Austria. From 1978 he taught business subjects at the Slovene language Technical School of Commerce in Gorizia, Italy.

Šavli became known in Slovenia in the mid-1980s, when he advanced the Venetic theory, together with the poet Matej Bor. According to the theory, the Slovenes were not descended from the Slavs that settled the region in the 6th century, but that they were descended from a proto-Slavic speaking people known as the Veneti. The theory was rejected in academic circles, but nevertheless gained widespread popularity in Slovenia, as well as some interest abroad.

Already in the early 1980s, Šavli began to publish articles and essays that concerned in particular traditions of the Medieval state of Carantania. In his books, Šavli emphasized the political and cultural continuity between the proto-Slovene state of Carantania and the later Duchy of Carinthia. Šavli claims to have discovered the Black Panther as the coat of arms or symbol of Carantania. This discovery is disputed by academic historians. Šavli lived and worked in Gorizia, where he died in March 2011.

== Essential bibliography ==
=== In Slovene ===
- Veneti: naši davni predniki ("Veneti: Our Ancient Forefathers", 1985), together with Matej Bor and Ivan Tomažič;
- Slovenska država Karantanija ("The Slovene State of Carantania", 1990);
- Slovenska znamenja ("Slovene Symbols", 1994);
- Slovenija: podoba evropskega naroda ("Slovenia: the Image of a European Nation", 1995);
- Etruščani in Veneti ("Etruscans and Veneti", 1995), together with Ivan Tomažič;
- Slovenski svetniki ("Slovene Saints", 1999).

=== In English ===
- Veneti : First Builders of European Community (1996);
- Slovenia : Discovering a European Nation (2003).
