= Ducal hat of Styria =

Crown of the Duchy of Styria

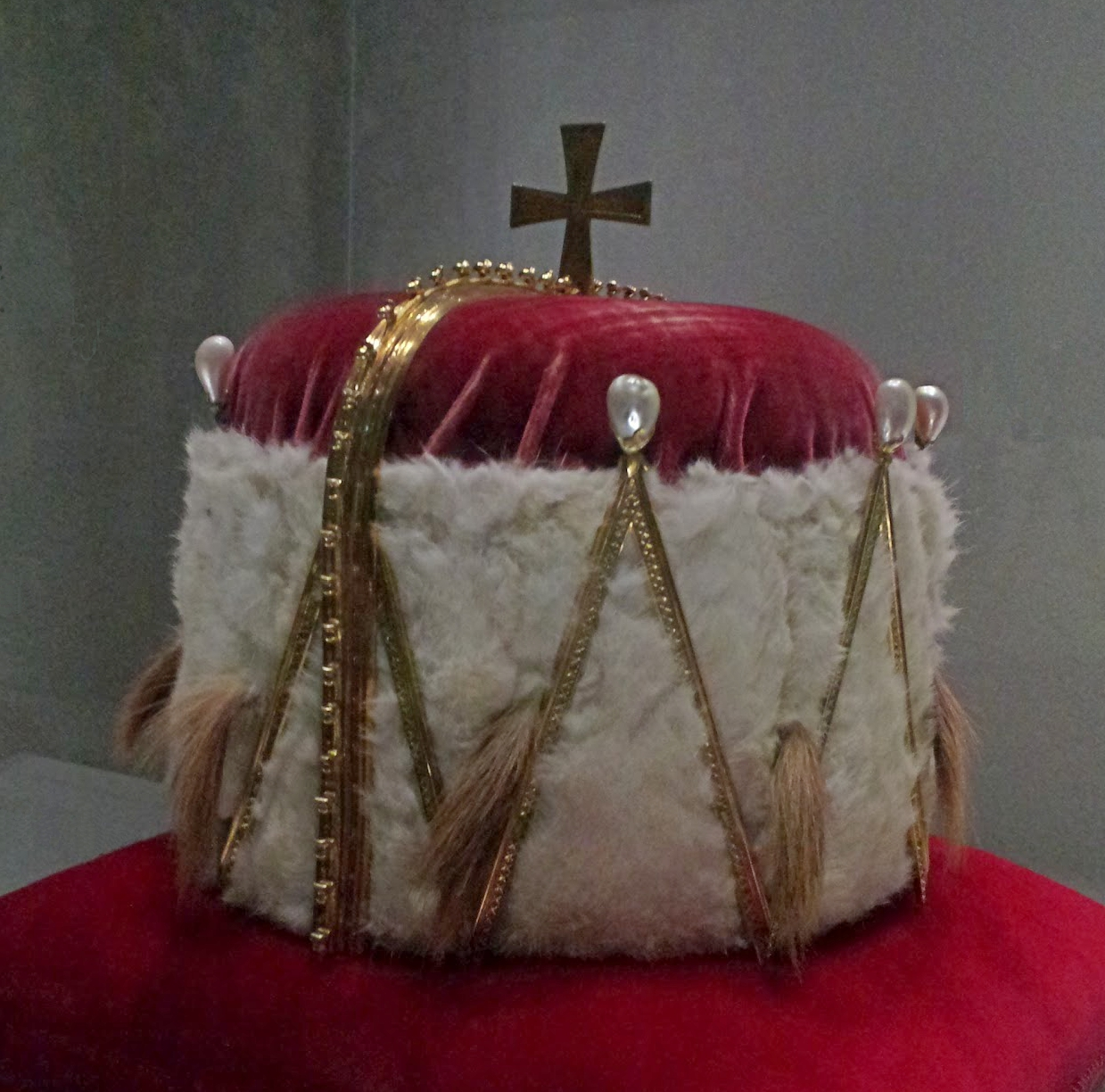
- Ducal hat of the Duchy of Styria is exhibited in the Museum im Palais in Graz.

Heraldic depictions

Details
- Country: Austria
- Made: XIV century
- Arches: 2
- Material: Silver-gilt
- Cap: Red velvet
- Notable stones: Pearls
- Other elements: Ermine

The ducal hat (German: Herzogshut) of the Duchy of Styria is a jagged crown made out of silver-gilt. It was refashioned with pearls and enameled in 1766.

Ducal hat crowning the coat of arms of Styria

It was kept in Vienna until 1790, when the Styrian Estates asked for it to be returned. In the 19th century, it was refitted again. The ducal hat is about 20.5 cm high, and has a diameter of 20 cm. It is kept today at the Landesmuseum Joanneum (Joanneum National Museum) in Graz, Styria, Austria.

The ducal hat is also featured on top of the coat of arms of the federal state of Styria (Steiermark).

== Literature ==
- Feierliche Übertragung des steierm. Herzoghutes, Gr. Ztg. 11. und 15. Juni 1750, Anh.
- Krauß, Ferd. Der steir. Herzogshut, Tagespost 1894, Nr. 346, p. 8.
- Joanneum-Festschrift 1911, p. 317.
- Bildführer des Kunstgew. Museums 1958.
- Smola, G. Sacrale und prof. Goldschmiedekunst aus der Steiermark. Alte und Mod. Kunst Nr. 49/1961, p. 6 and 11.

== See also ==
- Austrian Crown Jewels
- Austrian Imperial Crown
- Archducal hat
