= Hugo Eberhardt (1948) =

Director of TÜV Österreich

Hugo Eberhardt (born February 21, 1948, in Landl, Styria) was director of TÜV Österreich from 1994 until February 2013 and CEO of TUV AUSTRIA HOLDING AG from 2007 until February 2013.

== Education and career ==
Eberhardt attended the fourth academic high school in Graz. He graduated in 1966 and began his studies of technical chemistry at the Technical University of Graz in 1967, which he completed as "Graduate Engineer" in 1973. From 1973 to 1977 Eberhardt worked as an assistant at the Institute of Anorganic Chemistry at the Technical University Graz. He earned his PhD in Technical Sciences in 1977.

In 1977, Eberhardt joined the "Technischen Überwachungs-Verein Wien" (Technical Inspection Association Vienna, TÜV Wien) at its branch in Wels, where he was tasked with the expansion and management of the Institute of Environmental Technology and Technical Chemistry.

In 1990, he became the head of the federally authorized Research Institute of the Technical Inspection Association Vienna in Vienna.

Eberhardt was appointed Director of TÜV Österreich (previously Technical Inspection Association Vienna) in 1994. Following the reorganization of the association in 2007, Eberhardt assumed the position of Chairman of the Board of TUV Austria Holding AG.

Dr. Hugo Eberhardt retired from his offices as CEO of TÜV AUSTRIA HOLDING AG in 2013. He was succeeded by Dr. Stefan Haas in March 2013.

== Further offices ==
Since 1990 Eberhardt has been the Austrian representative in EuroLab, the European umbrella organization of testing laboratories) and is co-founder of AustroLab (the national representation of AustroLab) and has since been the president of this organization.

Since 1992 he has been a member of the delegation / head of the delegation of the Austrian Standards International in the ISO CASCO committee. Having held various position in CEOC International since 1986, Eberhardt was elected president of the important international parent organisation of independent conformity assessment bodies (comprising the fields of testing, inspection and certification) in 1999.

In 2008 he was appointed president of the Austrian Society of Non-Destructive Testing. Since 2007 Eberhardt has been the vice-president of the Society of Friends of the Technical Museum in Vienna and since 2010 member of the Presidential Council of the Austrian Standards Institute (ASI).

== Honours ==
Based on his services in the field technical safety, he received the title of "Technical Councillor" in 2003.

In 2009, Eberhardt was awarded the "Grand Decoration for Services to the Republic of Austria".
