= Miren =

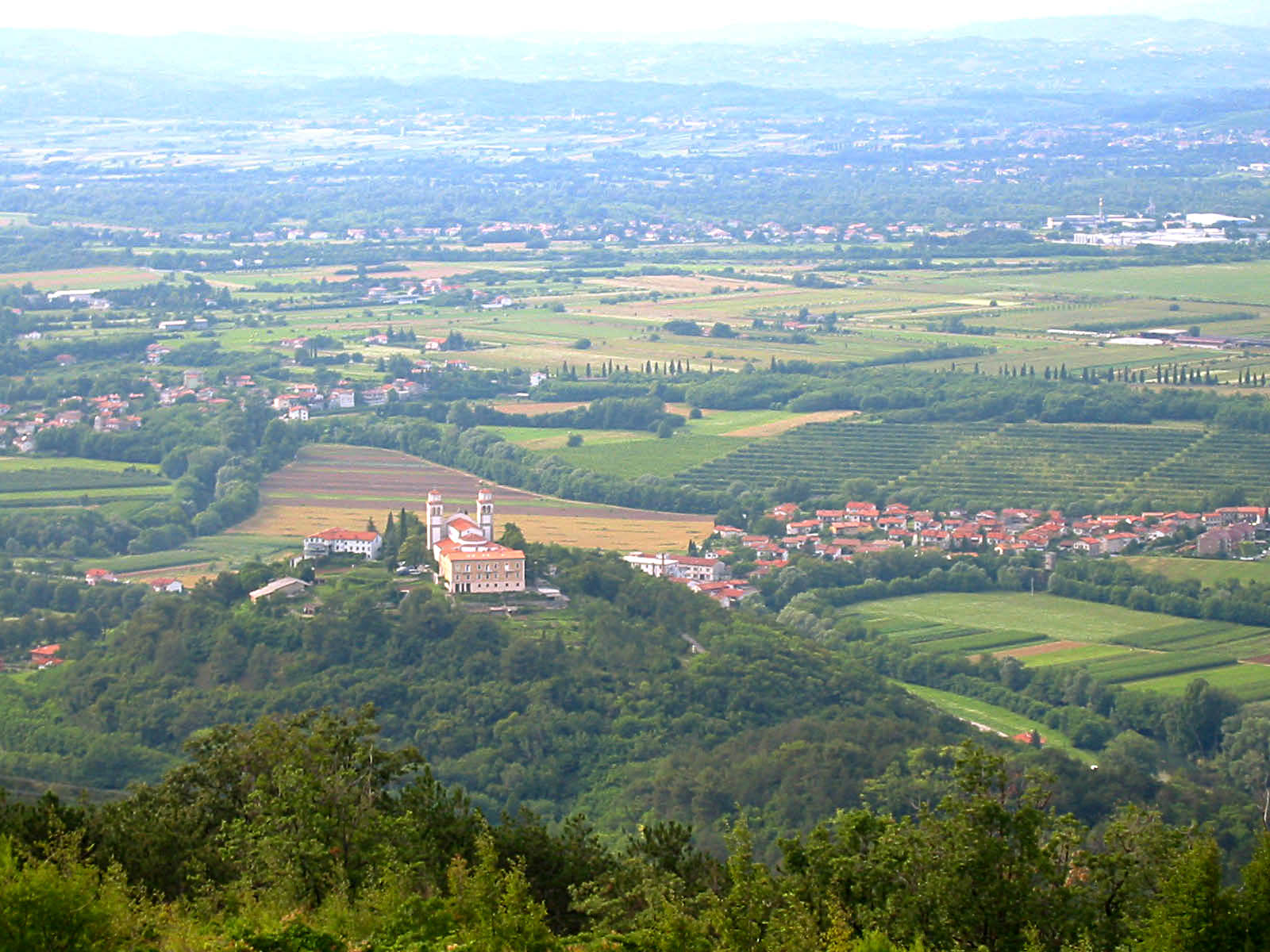
- View of Miren with Miren Castle from the Karst Plateau

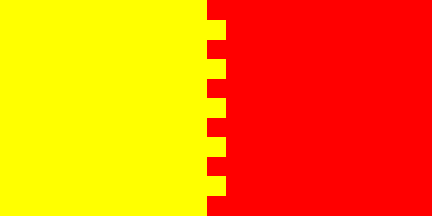
- Flag

- Location in Slovenia
- Coordinates: 45°53′46.15″N 13°36′25.9″E
- Country: Slovenia
- Traditional region: Littoral
- Statistical region: Gorizia
- Municipality: Miren-Kostanjevica

Area
  - Total: 2.48 km^{2} (0.96 sq mi)
- Elevation: 50.3 m (165 ft)

Population (2021)
  - Total: 1,506

Miren (pronounced [ˈmiːɾən]; Italian: Merna) is an urbanized settlement in the Municipality of Miren-Kostanjevica in the Littoral region of Slovenia right next to the border with Italy. The hill known as Miren Castle (Slovene: Mirenski grad) rises above the settlement to the south.

== Name ==
The settlement was attested in written sources in 1494 as Merinach an der Wippach, and in 1523 as Japinitz oder Merina. The name is believed to have arisen through ellipsis of a noun phrase (e.g., *miren grad 'walled castle'), leaving the adjective *miren 'walled' (< *myrьnъ). If so, the name refers to the walls of Miren Castle above the settlement. A less likely theory derives the name from *Marijin 'Mary's', referring to the pilgrimage church above the settlement.

== History ==
After the fall of the Roman Empire and the interlude of the Ostrogothic Kingdom, the Lombards and the Slavs settled in the area in the 6th century. The village became part of the Duchy of Friuli. It later passed to the Franks, the Bavarians and in 1500 became part of the County of Gorizia and Gradisca under the Habsburgs.

Miren suffered heavy damage during the First World War, after which it was incorporated into the Kingdom of Italy. According to the 1921 census, only around 3% of the population was Italian. In 1927, it became a municipality, absorbing the hamlets of Rupa, Peč, Gabrije and Savogna d'Isonzo. In 1947, Miren became part of Yugoslavia, though its four hamlets remained part of Italy. Since 1991, it has been part of Slovenia.

Between 1947 and 1975, the Italy–Yugoslavia border ran through Miren cemetery, cutting graves in half. The border was corrected through minor land swaps with the Treaty of Osimo, placing the entire cemetery within Yugoslav (now Slovenian) territory.

== Church ==
The parish church in the settlement is dedicated to Saint George and belongs to the Diocese of Koper. It was built between 1827 and 1828.

== Notable people ==
Notable people that were born or lived in Miren include:

- Mihaela Adelgundis Černic (1913–2016), painter
- Leopold Kemperle (1886–1950), journalist
- Oskar Kogoj (born 1942), industrial designer
- Vera Lestan (1908–1943), kindegarten headmistress, poet, pastoral worker
- Krištof Spollad (1777–1858), priest
- Marko Vuk (1947–2004), art historian
- Stanko Vuk (1912–1912), poet, writer
