= Miren Castle =

Coordinates: 45°53′0.93″N 13°36′15.18″E

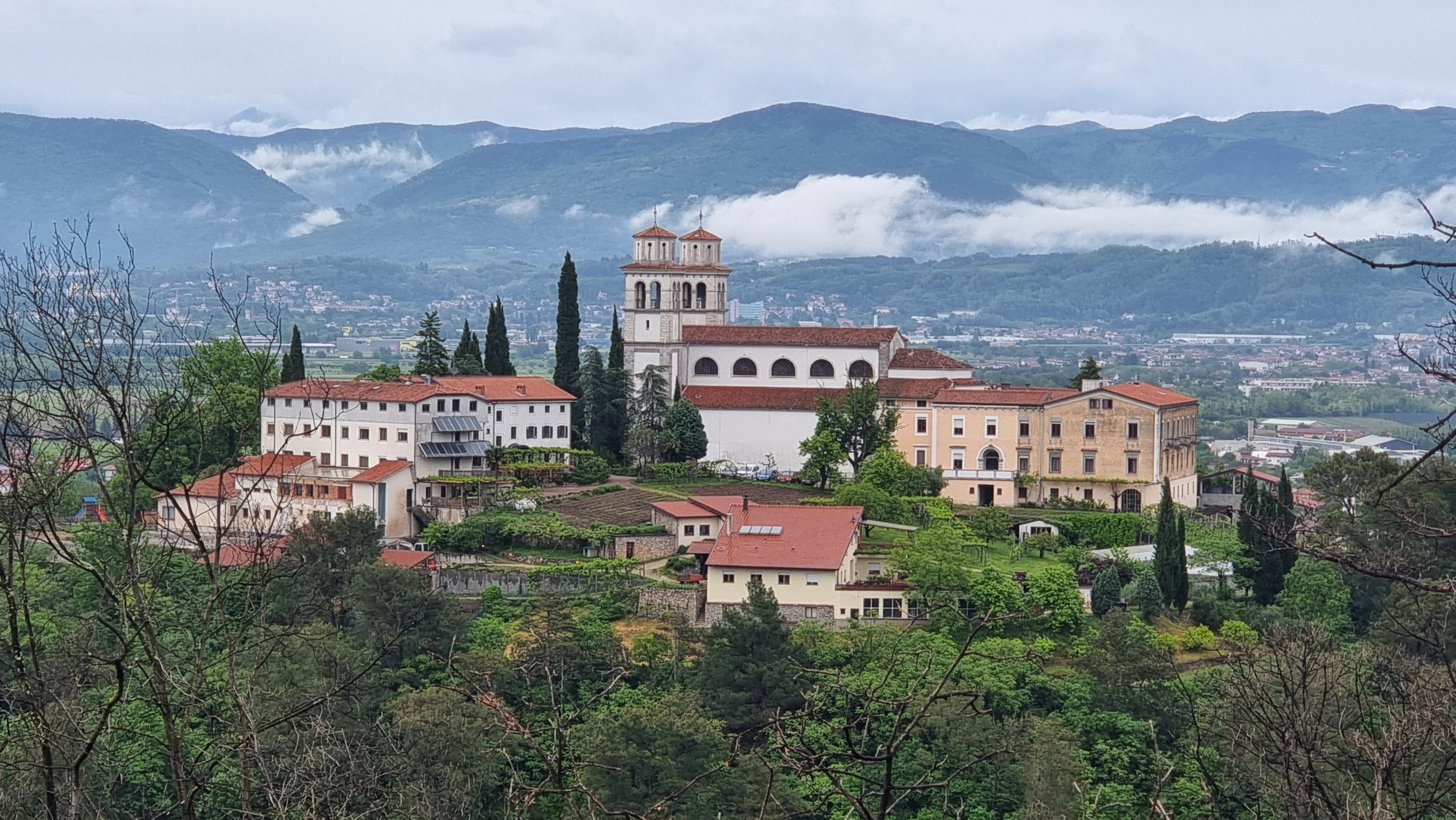
Miren Castle

Miren Castle (Slovene: Mirenski grad, also known as Grad 'castle' and Naša Gospa pod Krasom 'Our Lady beneath the Karst'; Italian: Grado di Merna or Castello di Merna) is an elevation above the settlement of Miren near Nova Gorica, in southwest Slovenia. The origin of the name, which came into usage in the 16th century, remains unexplained. No castle ever stood there. The hill is dominated by a collection of ecclesiastical buildings.

== Legend ==
The origins of Miren Castle is a tale which is famous among the citizens of Miren. Long ago there lived a noble and glorious king known as Miren. He was a man of a kind heart who built the settlement of Miren to serve as homes for peasants who were struggling from poverty. Now he is regarded as an ancient hero.

== Our Lady of Sorrows Church ==
Over the centuries, a series of churches have occupied the site. The first recorded was the Church of Our Lady, built in 1488, rebuilt in 1753, and destroyed on 30 May 1914. Between 1700 and 1756, Grad was inhabited by hermits. The summit of Grad is now dominated by a monastic church dedicated to Our Lady of Sorrows (Slovene: cerkev Žalostne Matere božje). It was built in 1886, and was completely destroyed and rebuilt during and after each World War. In 1958, its interior was decorated with frescoes by Tone Kralj. The entrance gate bears the inscription Ite in domum Matris Vestræ 'Go into the house of your mother'. It is still a pilgrimage destination.

== Other ==
The path to Miren Castle features Stations of the Cross designed by the architect Ivan Vurnik in 1931. By the last station there stands the architecturally unique Chapel of the Scala Sancta (Slovene: svete stopnice), the floor of which is made of 28 stepped platforms. It was blessed in 1757 by the Gorizia archbishop Karl Michael von Attems.
