= Herbert Walzl =

Austrian actor and director (1959–2022)

Herbert Walzl (born 12 November 1959 in Styria, died 10 September 2022) was an Austrian stage actor, theatre director and playwright. He was the founder and chairman of the Sellawie Theatre in Enns.

== Life as an actor ==
As a child, Herbert Walzl moved with his parents to Hohensteg an der Aist, in Upper Austria. As a teenager, he played at the Aiserbühne Schwertberg. There, he played leading roles in Molière and Goldoni comedies. Besides training as a construction worker, Herbert Walzl completed well-founded acting training. He completed this training through the Joint Examination Board in 1994. Since 1990, he has been working as a project manager for an employment project for the long-term unemployed in Steyr.

Herbert Walzl leads workshops and seminars in acting, speaking technique, and group dynamics. He is the director of the Sellawie Theater in Enns. In 2016, he founded the “Theater am Fluss” in Steyr together with Bernhard Oppl. In 2017, he gained the entire property on the banks of the Enns river. Every year Walzl stages musical open-air summer productions there, mostly with self-composed material, in collaboration with the musical director Wiff LaGrange, who handles composition and arrangements. A newly created indoor theatre for approx. 100 people offers a cabaret, music and theatre program all year round.

== Life as a playwright ==
As a playwright, Herbert Walzl writes every book of his stage projects himself. Either completely new texts are created, such as 2. Stock, Tür 7 (comedy), or he reworks traditional theatre texts. In 2009, he produced his first musical Robin Hood in collaboration with the composer Wiff Enzenhofer, first performed in the cellar vault of Ennsegg Castle in Enns as part of a production by the Sellawie Theater. Walzl is the author of socially critical youth plays such as Aufgeblättert and Spiel(e). He adapted classic fairy tales by Hans Christian Andersen (Die kleine Meerjungfrau and Die Schneekönigin). Other versions are Dracula (2010), Frankenstein (2011), Die Nibelungensage I - Siegfried (2012) and Die Nibelungensage II - Kriemhilds Rache (2013).

== Awards ==
- 2007 Citta Slow Award of the city of Enns with the Sellawie Theater for its revision of Dracula
- 2010 cultural honour award of the city of Enns.
- In 2004 Walzl was counted by the Upper Austrian News among the 1000 compatriots "who make a difference in Upper Austria".
