= Coat of arms of Styria =

The coat of arms in its current iteration

The Coat of arms of Styria (German: Steirisches Wappen) is the historic coat of arms of the region of Styria, a federal state of Austria. It shows a white heraldic panther (the 'Styrian Panther') with red horns and claws breathing red fire on a green field. The shield is crowned with the ducal hat of Styria. The coat of arms is also used in several municipal arms of the state, including Graz and Fürstenfeld.

== The Styrian Panther ==
The panther, as the heraldic animal of Styria, was first definitively used in the seal of Margrave Ottokar III in 1160. It was derived from the arms of the Traungau (see Otakars) family. When Styria was made a duchy in 1180, the panther became the symbol of the entire duchy. The panther was originally black on a white field, but this was changed to the current color scheme in the 13th century in order to avoid confusion with Carantania, which at the time also used the black panther arms.

The coat of arms was first described in detail by the chronicler Ottokar of the Gaal, who documented around 1315 how the Styrian nobility fought alongside King Ottokar II of Bohemia in 1253 against the Hungarians under King Béla IV. Ottokar's state marshal, Herrand von Wildon described the flag as

"ein banier grüene als ein gras / darin ein pantel swebte / blanc, als ob ez lebte“ (a banner as green as grass / wherein a panther floated / white, as if it were alive)

In its current form, the coat of arms has been officially used since 1926 when a law restricted flames to only shoot out of the panther's mouth. Prior to that flames had also emerged from the panther's ears, phallus, and anus. A member of the state parliament, Frida Mikula, sponsored the change due to the arms' apparent "obscenity".

The heraldic animal in its pre-1926 form can be seen today in the coat of arms of the Styrian capital, Graz.

Heraldic research today also points to the strong symbolic effect and the tradition of the Styrian coat of arms: “The Styrian heraldic animal has [...] become a quasi-living symbol of Styrian independence. With the possible exception of the Tyrolean eagle, no coat of arms of the Austrian federal states can match it in terms of identity. [...] The Styrian coat of arms has been in use in practically unchanged form for more than 750 years. Together with the red-white-red shield it is one of the oldest and most venerable state symbols in Europe."

== Gallery ==
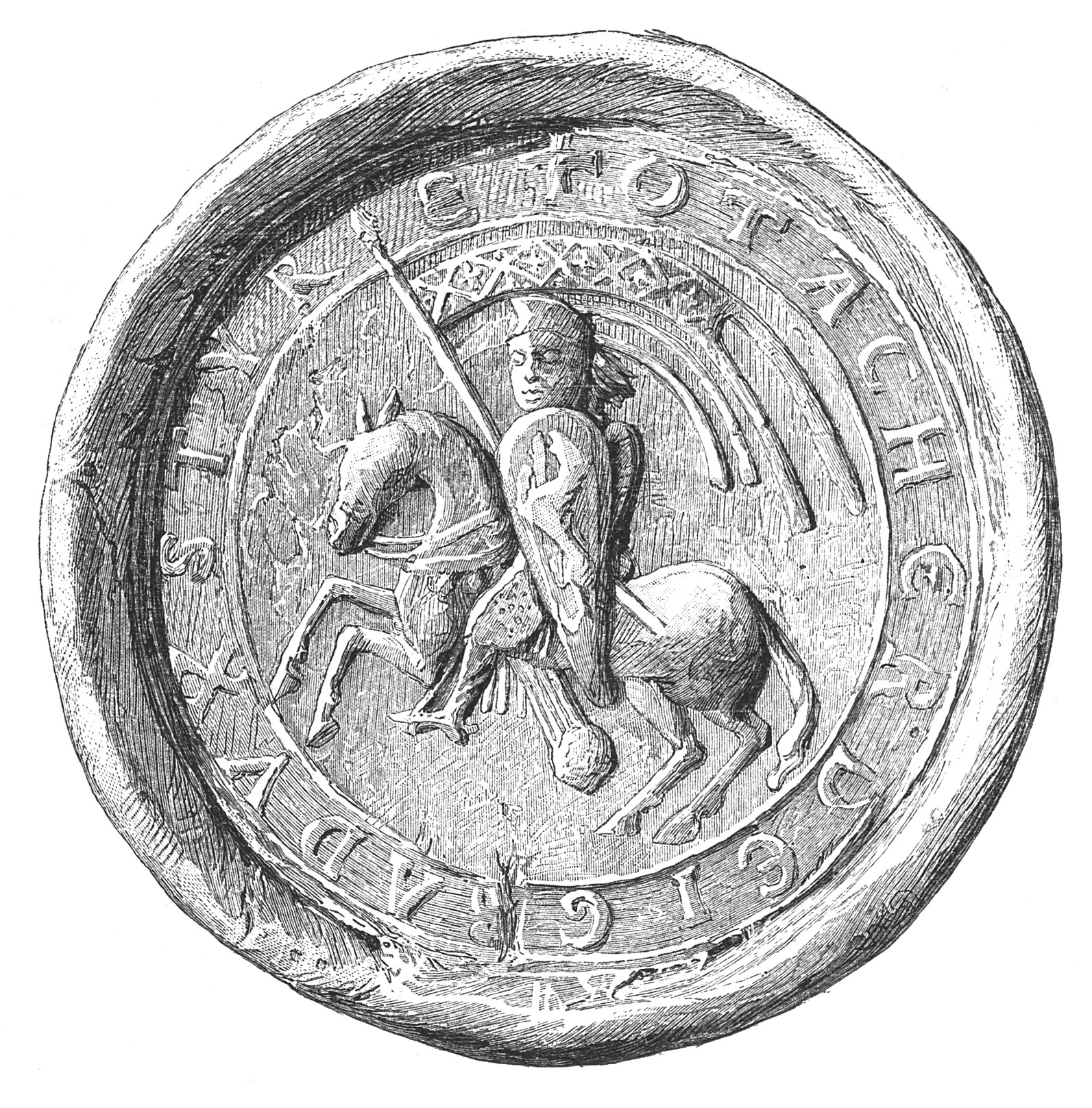
The panther's earliest appearance on Ottokar III of Styria's seal, 1160

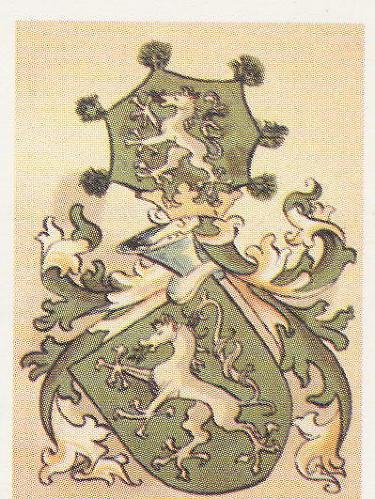
Ducal arms, 1445

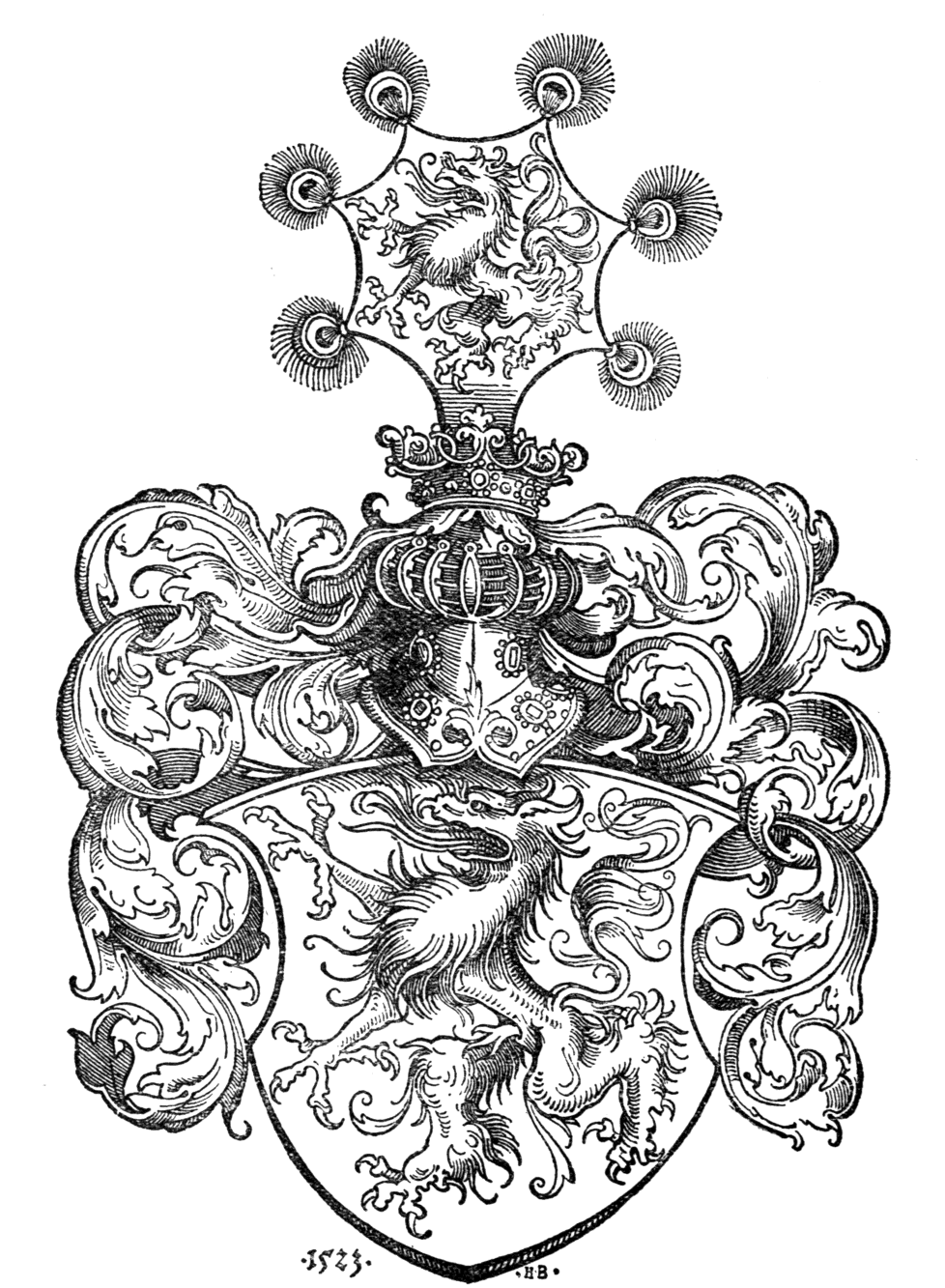
Ducal arms, Hans Burgkmair, 1525

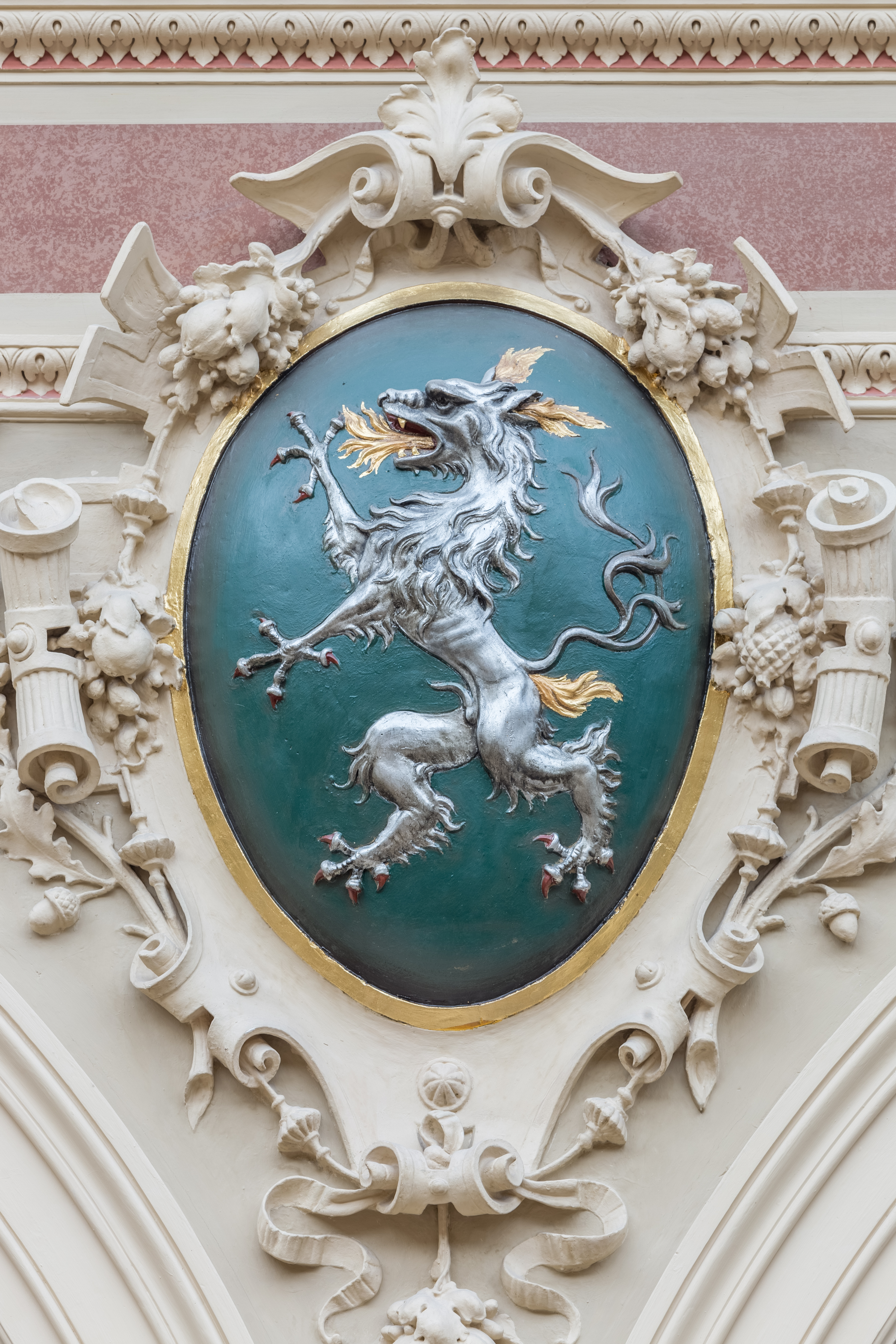
The arms in the Aula of the Palace of Justice, Vienna, circa 1880

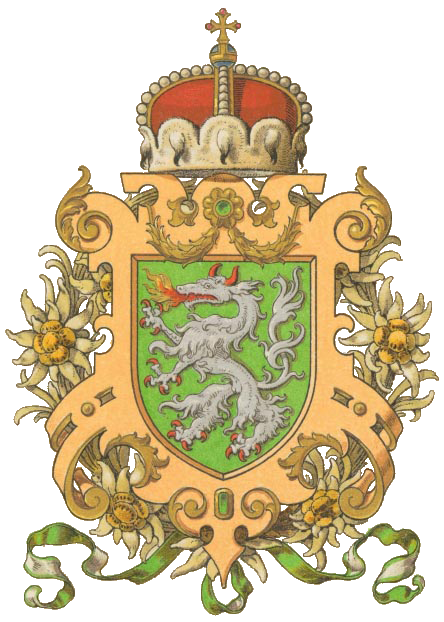
The arms in a heraldic console decorated with edelweiss, Hugo Gerard Ströhl, 1890

The current arms of Graz, showing the Panther in its pre-1926 state

On the arms of the eponymous city of Steyr

Enns

Mödling

Kainbach bei Graz, showing a lion and a panther
