= Panther (legendary creature) =

Mythological creature

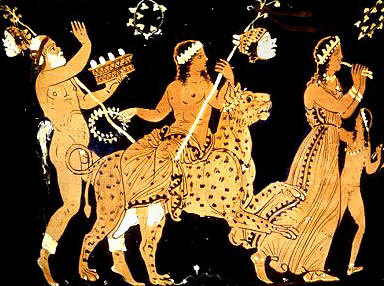
Ancient Greek art depicting Dionysus riding a panther

A panther is a creature in ancient legend that resembles a big cat with a multicoloured hide.

According to medieval beliefs, after feasting, the panther will sleep in a cave for a total of three days. After this period ends, the panther roars, in the process emitting a sweet smelling odor. This odor draws in any creatures who smell it (the dragon being the only creature immune); they are eaten by the panther, and the cycle begins again.

The ancient Greeks believed the panther was one of the favored mounts of the god Dionysus.

Other names for this creature are pantera, pantere, and love cervere.

== Illustration ==
Heraldry from Raglan Castle, Wales, featuring an example of a non-feline panther

Usually depicted as a type of cat, the panther was at times depicted in other forms. It was depicted as a donkey, as a composite creature with a horned head, long neck and a horse's body, and as a host of other forms. (The word "panther", in Greek, could be interpreted as "every wild beast", supporting the idea of a composite creature.) This was mostly because those involved did not know what a panther should look like; but, in some instances, this was due to cultural influences. In Germany in particular, the panther is often depicted in heraldry as a creature with four horns, cow's ears and a fiery red tongue. An example of the former is the flag and coat of arms of the city of Cres, Croatia.

== Heraldry ==
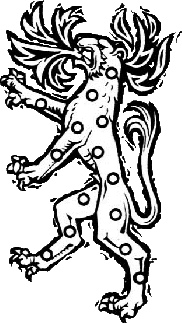
A panther as described in medieval bestiaries and used in heraldry

In heraldry the panther is commonly used in a form known as the panther incensed. In this form, the panther is depicted with flames coming from its mouth and ears, representing the panther's sweet odour.

The heraldic panther is usually shown with coloured spots (semée of roundels), which are frequently blue and red. The arms of the Worshipful Company of Dyers, however, have as supporters two panthers with red, blue, green, purple and black spots. These colours are also seen on the badge of the National Crime Agency, which features a panther as one of its supporters. The panther was used by Henry VI of England as his badge and by other members of the House of Lancaster.

The coat of arms of Styria, Austria

A panther which is all silver (argent) is seen in the coat of arms of the Austrian province of Styria (Steiermark) on green (Vert) shield.

== See also ==
- Cath Palug – Monstrous cat in Welsh legend
- Jaguars in Mesoamerican cultures
- Tepēyōllōtl – Aztec jaguar god
- Underwater panther
- Werecat
- Were-jaguar
