= Styria =

Austrian state

Styria Steiermark
- State
- Federal State of Styria; Bundesland Steiermark (German); Bundeslånd Steiamoåk (Bavarian); Zvezna dežela Štajerska (Slovene); Stájerországi Szövetségi Tartomány (Hungarian)
- Flag Coat of arms
- Anthem: Dachsteinlied ("Song of the Dachstein")
- Coordinates: 47°15′N 15°10′E
- Country: Austria
- Capital: Graz

Government
  - Body: Landtag of Styria
  - Governor: Mario Kunasek (FPÖ)
  - Deputy Governor: Manuela Khom (ÖVP)

Area
  - Total: 16,399.34 km^{2} (6,331.82 sq mi)

Population (1 January 2023)
  - Total: 1,265,198
  - Estimate (1 January 2026): 1,272,195
  - Density: 77.14932/km^{2} (199.8158/sq mi)

GDP
  - Total: €63.924 billion (2024)
  - Per capita: €50,294 (2024)
- Time zone: UTC+1 (CET)
  - Summer (DST): UTC+2 (CEST)
- ISO 3166 code: AT-6
- HDI (2022): 0.923 very high · 4th of 9
- NUTS Region: AT2
- Votes in Bundesrat: 9 (of 62)
- Website: Federal state government

Styria (Austrian German: Steiermark [ˈʃtaɪɐmark]; Bavarian: Steiamårk; Slovene: Štajerska; Hungarian: Stájerország [ˈʃtaːjɛrorsaːɡ]) is an Austrian state in the southeast of the country. With an area of approximately 16,399 km^{2} (6,332 sq mi), it is Austria's second-largest state by area, after Lower Austria. Styria borders Slovenia to the south and, clockwise from the southwest, the Austrian states of Carinthia, Salzburg, Upper Austria, Lower Austria and Burgenland. Its capital and largest city is Graz, Austria's second-largest city after Vienna.

The state had a population of 1,271,716 on 1 January 2025. Graz is the political, economic and educational centre of the state, while other important towns include Leoben, Kapfenberg, Bruck an der Mur, Judenburg, Knittelfeld, Weiz, Hartberg, Fürstenfeld and Leibnitz.

Styria is geographically diverse. The northern and northwestern parts, commonly known as Upper Styria (German: Obersteiermark), are mountainous. The central and southern parts of the state include the Graz Basin, hill country, agricultural areas, vineyards and thermal-spring regions. Styria is popularly known as the "Green Heart of Austria".

Historically, Styria developed from the March of Styria, which was named after Steyr in present-day Upper Austria. It became a margraviate in the 11th century and was raised to the Duchy of Styria in 1180. In 1192, under the terms of the Georgenberg Pact, Styria passed to the Babenberg dukes of Austria, linking its history closely with that of Austria. The region later became part of the Habsburg monarchy and, together with Carinthia and Carniola, formed a core part of Inner Austria.

The historic duchy was larger than the modern Austrian state. After World War I, southern Styria, including the cities of Maribor, Celje and Ptuj, was separated from Austria and became part of the Kingdom of Serbs, Croats and Slovenes, later Yugoslavia and now Slovenia. This region is commonly known in English as Slovenian Styria or Lower Styria.

Styria is one of Austria's major industrial and research regions. Its economy includes manufacturing, mechanical engineering, automotive supply industries, metallurgy, wood processing, environmental technology, agriculture and tourism. The Graz area is a major centre of universities, research institutions and high-technology industries, while Upper Styria has a long association with mining, iron and steel production. Southern and eastern Styria are noted for wine, fruit growing, spas and culinary tourism.

== Name ==
The March of Styria derived its name from the original seat of its ruling Otakar dynasty: Steyr, in today's Upper Austria, which in turn derives its name from the namesake river of Steyr, stemming from the Celtic Stiria. In the native German the area is still called "Steiermark", while in English the Latin name "Styria" is used. Until the late 19th century however, the German name "Steyer", a slightly modernized spelling of Steyr, was also common. The ancient link between the city of Steyr and Styria is also apparent in their nearly identical coats of arms, a white Panther on a green background. Styria is also popularly known as the "Green March", owing to it being the most forested of all the Austrian states, or as the "Iron Margraviate" for its long heritage of manufacturing and engineering.

== Geography ==
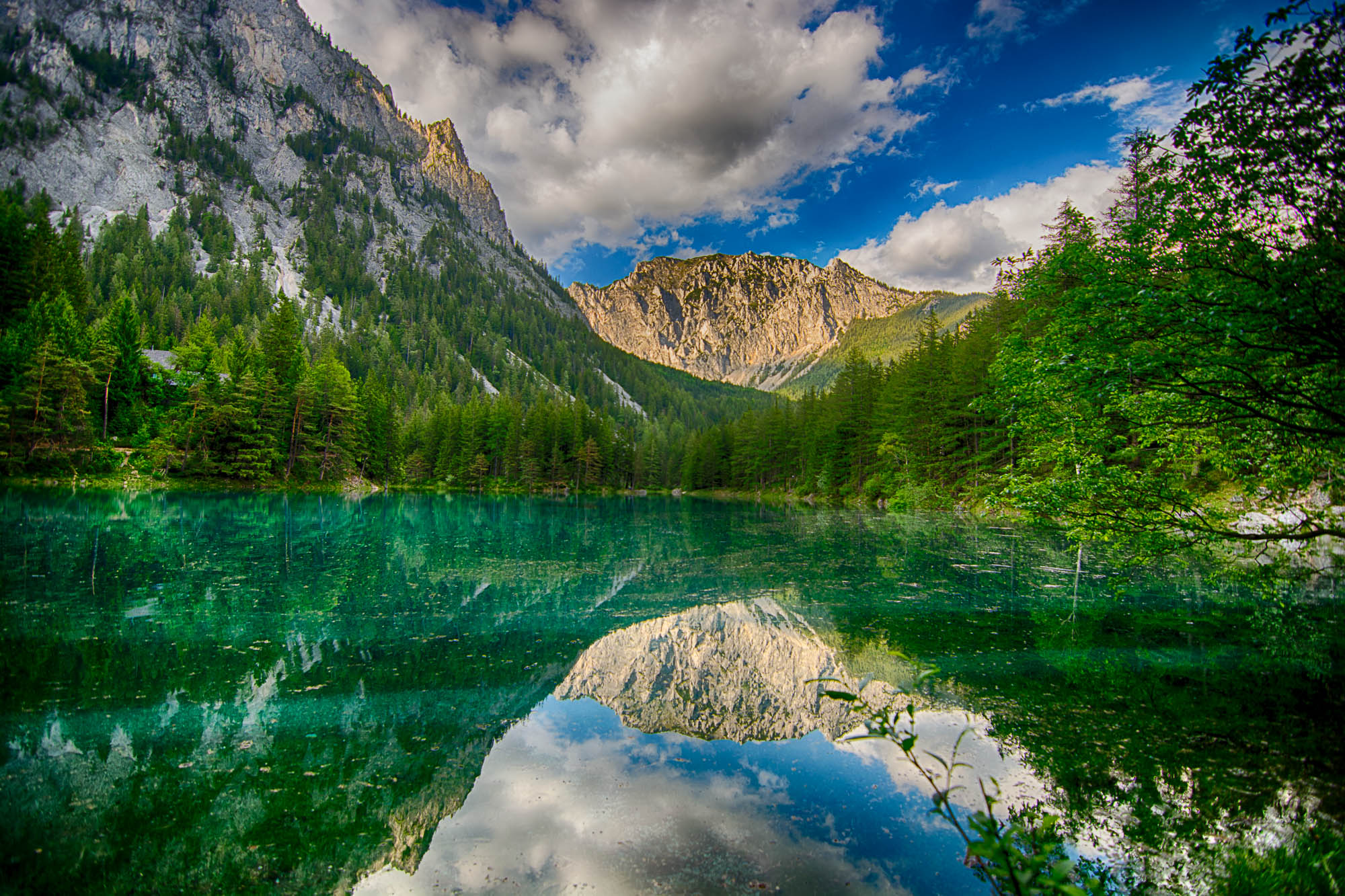
Grüner See with part of the Hochschwab Mountains in the back

Styria is geographically diverse. The northern and northwestern parts, commonly known as Upper Styria (German: Obersteiermark), are mountainous and include parts of the Northern Limestone Alps and the Central Eastern Alps, with valleys formed by the Mur, Mürz, Enns and Salza rivers. The central and southern parts of the state include the Graz Basin, hill country, agricultural areas, vineyards and thermal-spring regions. Because of its extensive forests and varied landscapes, Styria is popularly known as the "Green Heart of Austria".

- The term "Upper Styria" (German: Obersteiermark) refers to the northern and northwestern parts of the federal state (districts Liezen, Murau, Murtal, Leoben, Bruck-Mürzzuschlag). The districts of Leoben and Bruck-Mürzzuschlag are also called "High Styria" (Hochsteiermark).
- The term "Western Styria" (Weststeiermark) is used for the districts west of Graz (Voitsberg, Deutschlandsberg, western part of the district Leibnitz). Because of the similar landscape with hills, valleys, wine and culture, the region in western Styria is also called "Styrian Tuscany".
- The districts east of Graz (Weiz, Hartberg-Fürstenfeld, and Südoststeiermark) are referred to as "Eastern Styria" (Oststeiermark).

The western and eastern parts of the district Graz-Umgebung (literally, "Graz-surroundings") may or may not be considered parts of West and East Styria, respectively. The southern fourth of the historic Duchy of Styria, which after World War I became part of Yugoslavia and later Slovenia (except for World War II), was (and sometimes colloquially still is) referred to as "Lower Styria" (Untersteiermark; Slovene: Štajerska).

== History ==
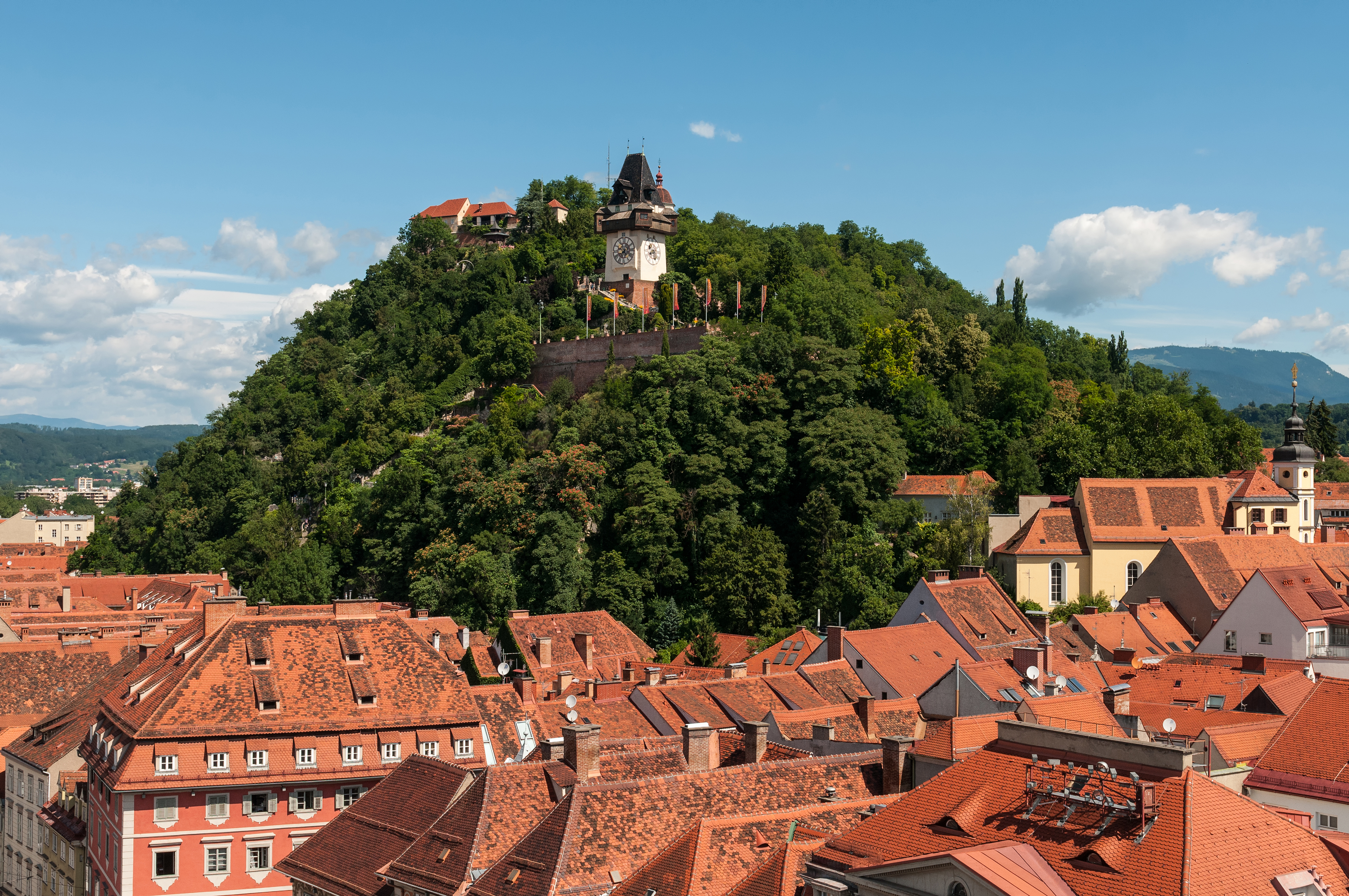
Graz, the capital of Styria

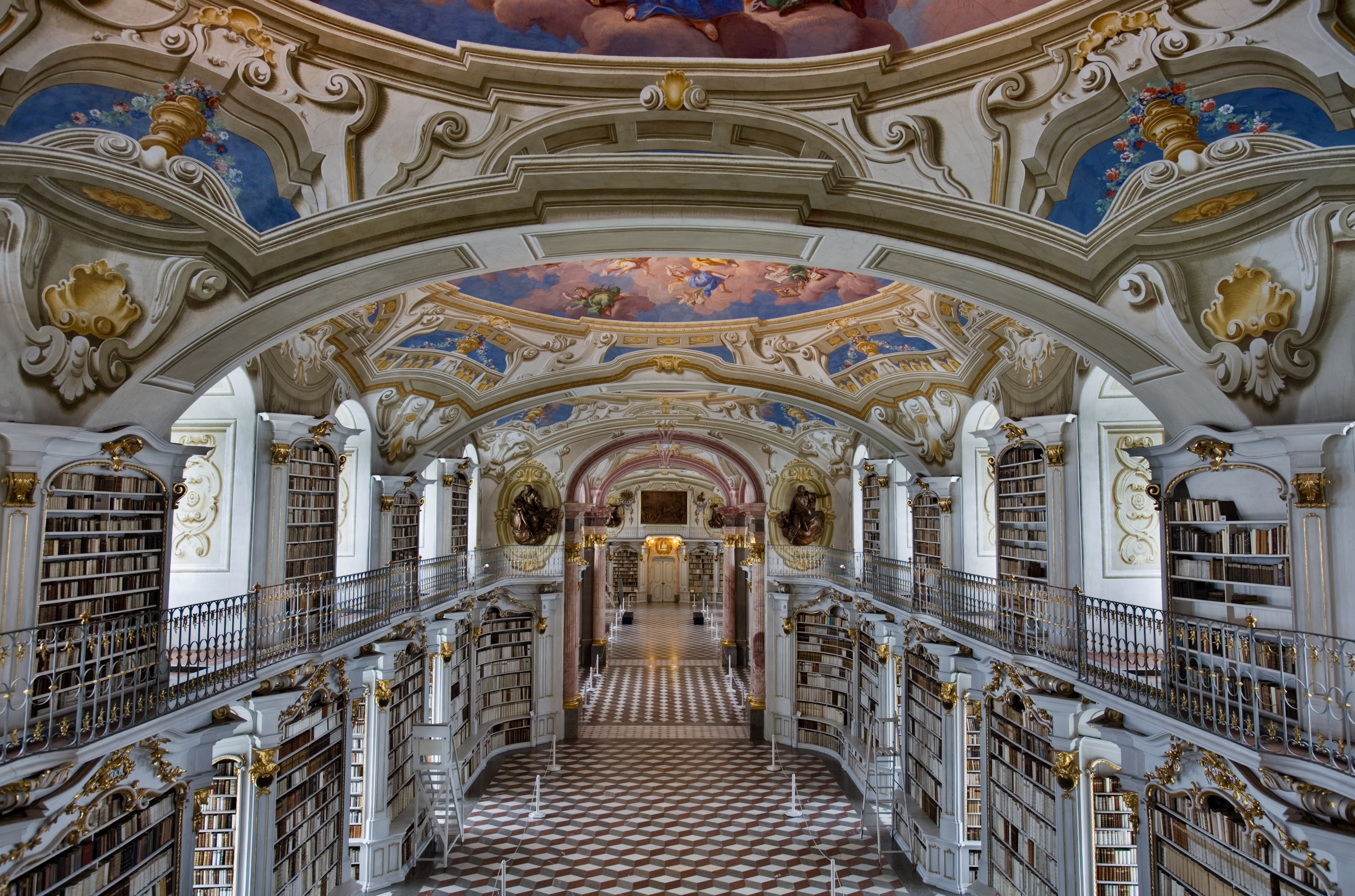
Admont Abbey library

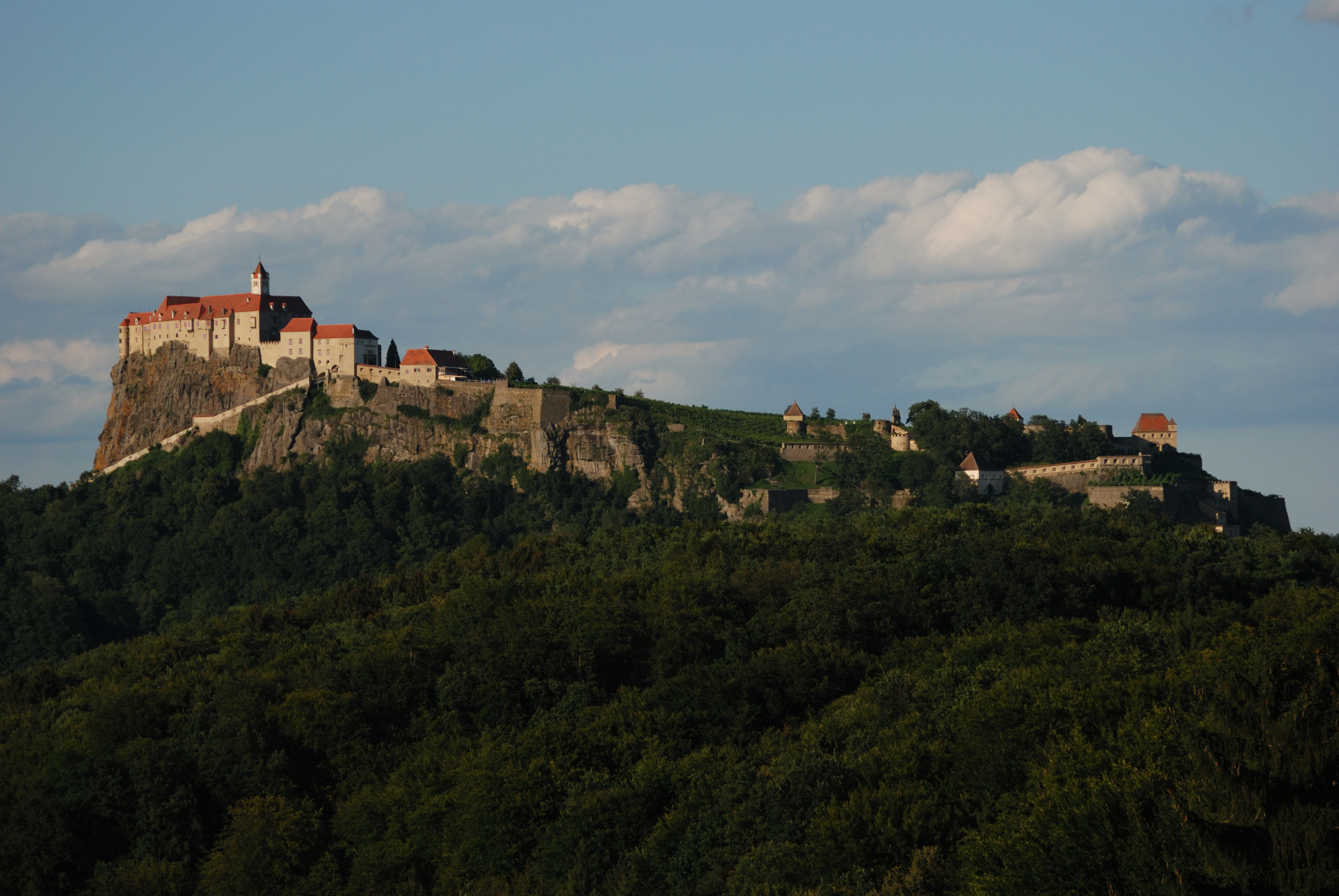
Riegersburg Castle is a symbol of Styria

Styria was inhabited by Celtic tribes. After its conquest by the Romans, the eastern part of what is now Styria was part of Pannonia, while the western one was included in Noricum. During the Barbarian invasions, it was conquered or crossed by the Visigoths, the Huns, the Ostrogoths, the Rugii, and the Lombards. Slavs under the domination of the Avars settled in the valleys around 600. At the same time, Bavarians under Frankish domination began to expand their area to the south and east, ultimately absorbing the Slavic population.

Under the Otakar dynasty, Styria was made into a margraviate in 1056 and in 1180, also separated from the Duchy of Carinthia to become a Duchy of its own; Per the Georgenberg Pact, the Austrian Duke Leopold V also became Duke of Styria in 1192. After the demise of the Babenberg dynasty (to which Leopold belonged), Styria came briefly under the control of Hungary and later Bohemia. During this time, it lost vast parts of its territory, including the former capital Steyr (which would later form a significant part of the emerging "Duchy of Austria above the Enns" or Upper Austria), as well as Pitten (now the southeastern part of Lower Austria). When the Habsburgs reunified Austria in 1282, Pitten was returned to Styria until the 16th century when Austria finally annexed it. During this time, Styria formed the central part of Inner Austria.

Ottoman raids into Styria were a recurrent threat from the 15th to the 17th century. The incursions caused severe devastation and depopulation.

Styria developed economically under Archduke John of Austria, the so-called "Styrian Prince", between 1809 and 1859.

In 1918, after World War I, the Duchy of Styria was partitioned broadly along ethnic lines (though where mixed, the defeated Austrian side lost the lands in question to Yugoslavia, such as the majority German-speaking Abstall basin) into a northern part, constituting the Austrian state of Styria, as well as the continuation of the Styrian state altogether, and a southern one, traditionally called Lower Styria, though Lower Styria does not exist as any political entity and is only a traditional term. As a result of the turbulence of two world wars, the German-speaking population of Lower Styria, which had mainly been concentrated in the cities, particularly the so-called "Festungsdreieck" (fortress-triangle) of Maribor (Marburg an der Drau), Celje (Cilli) and Ptuj (Pettau) migrated from the region or was expelled.

== Economy ==
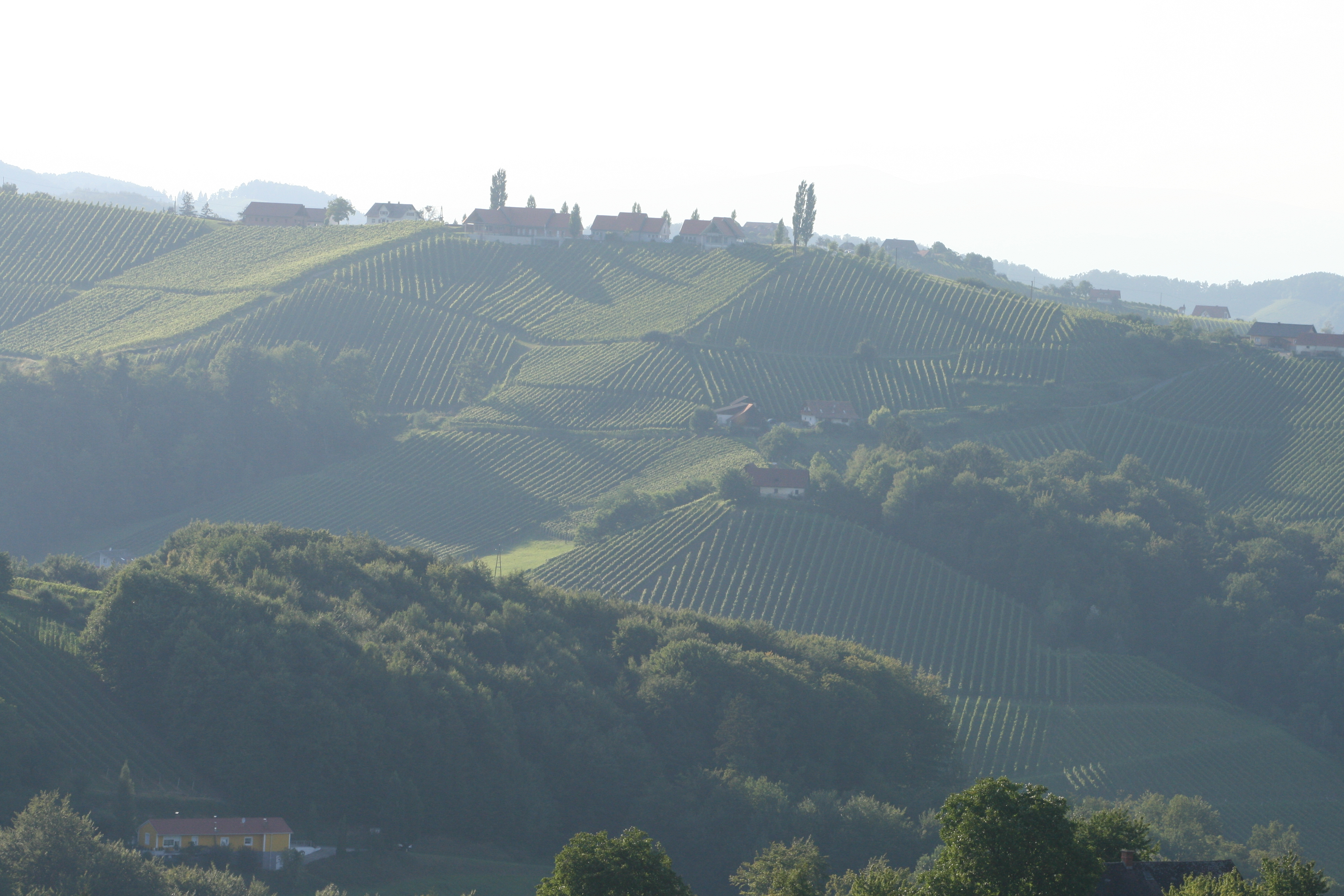
View over the vineyards of Western Styria

The federal state's gross domestic product (GDP) was 49.6 billion € in 2018, accounting for 12.9% of Austria's economic output. GDP per capita adjusted for purchasing power was €35,400 or 118% of the EU27 average in the same year.

In 2004, Styria had the strongest economic growth rate in Austria at 3.8%—mainly due to the Graz area, which saw strong economic growth that year and has continued to grow in economic and population terms since then.

Styria is home to more than 150 clean technology companies of which one dozen are world technology leaders in their field. The revenue of Styrian cleantech companies totals €2.7 billion. This equals 8 percent of the gross regional product (GRP) and is one of the highest concentrations of leading clean technology companies in Europe. The companies have an average (real) growth rate of 22 percent per year—well above the worldwide cleantech market growth of 18 percent per year. The region created roughly 2,000 additional green jobs in 2008 alone.

The Formula One Austrian Grand Prix has been held in the region, first at the Zeltweg Airfield in 1964 and then at the Osterreichring from 1970 to 1987. The sport returned to the circuit, now redesigned and rebranded as the A1-Ring, from 1997 to 2003. Formula One once again returned to the circuit, now renamed the Red Bull Ring, in 2014 and has been held at the track every year since. The COVID-19 pandemic saw the 2020 Formula One calendar massively revised, resulting in the Red Bull Ring becoming the first circuit to host consecutive Formula One World Championship Grands Prix, with the first round running under the Austrian Grand Prix name and the second held as the Styrian Grand Prix. This continued in 2021.

Styria is served by Graz Airport which provides direct routes to Vienna and some other European destinations. The airport had received around 820,000 passengers in 2024.

== Administrative divisions ==
The federal state is divided into 13 districts (Bezirke), one of them a statutory city. There are 286 municipalities.

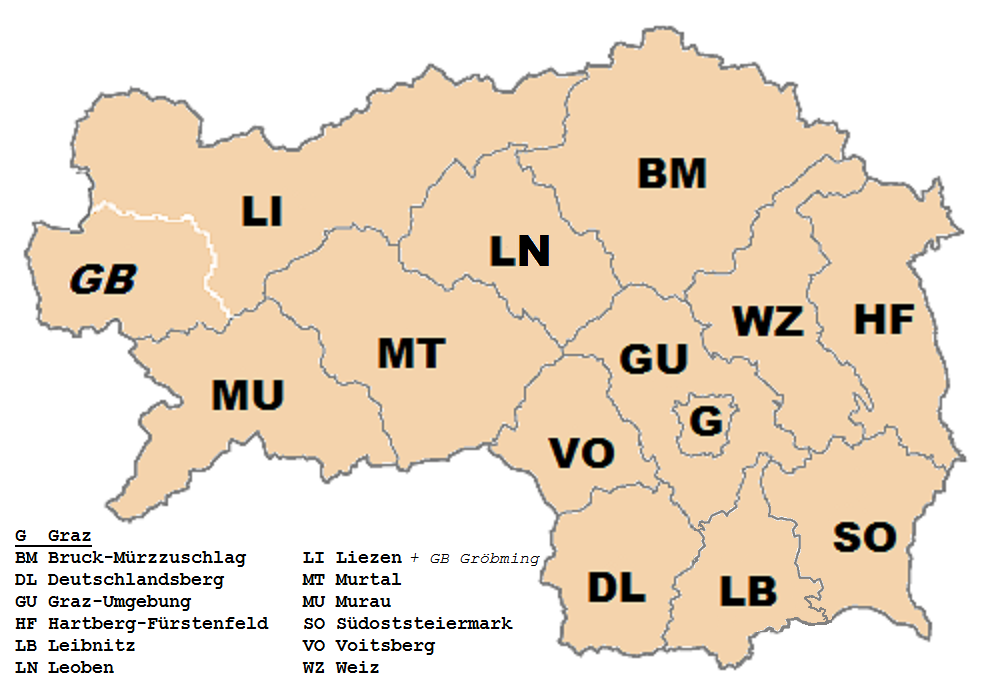
StyriaLänd Bezirke

=== Statutory city ===
- Graz

=== Districts ===
- Bruck-Mürzzuschlag
- Deutschlandsberg
- Graz-Umgebung
- Hartberg-Fürstenfeld
- Leibnitz
- Leoben
- Liezen (with the subdistrict Gröbming)
- Murau
- Murtal
- Südoststeiermark
- Voitsberg
- Weiz

== Largest cities in Styria ==
The following is a list of the nine largest cities and towns in Styria by population:

name	district	population (as of 2023)
Graz	Graz (statutory city)	298,623
Leoben	Leoben	25,140
Kapfenberg	Bruck-Mürzzuschlag	22,182
Bruck an der Mur	Bruck-Mürzzuschlag	15,970
Feldbach	Südoststeiermark	13,421
Leibnitz	Leibnitz	13,014
Knittelfeld	Murtal	12,781
Gratwein-Straßengel	Graz-Umgebung	12,770
Seiersberg-Pirka	Graz-Umgebung	12,112

== Demographics ==
The historical population is given in the following chart:

Historical population

Year	Pop.	±%
1869	720,809	—
1880	777,453	+7.9%
1890	828,375	+6.5%
1900	889,017	+7.3%
1910	957,610	+7.7%
1923	978,816	+2.2%
1934	1,014,920	+3.7%
1939	1,015,054	+0.0%

Year	Pop.	±%
1951	1,109,335	+9.3%
1961	1,137,865	+2.6%
1971	1,195,023	+5.0%
1981	1,186,525	−0.7%
1991	1,184,720	−0.2%
2001	1,183,303	−0.1%
2011	1,208,575	+2.1%
2021	1,251,683	+3.6%

Source: Censuses

== Politics ==
The federal state had been a stronghold of the Austrian People's Party (ÖVP) since 1945. Graz is markedly more left-wing than the rural districts of the federal state.

The governor (Austrian political term: Landeshauptmann) of Styria was, except from 2005 until 2015 and since 2024, always an ÖVP politician.

In the 2021 municipal election in Graz, the Communist Party of Austria (KPÖ) surprisingly took over first place from the ÖVP, thus pushing long-time mayor Siegfried Nagl (ÖVP) out of office. The result was noted internationally. Elke Kahr led the KPÖ for a third time in the 2021 Graz local election. Despite opinion polling suggesting a victory for the ruling ÖVP, the KPÖ became the largest party with 28.8% of votes and 15 seats. After the election, the KPÖ entered into coalition talks with The Greens – The Green Alternative and the Social Democratic Party of Austria (SPÖ). On 13 November 2021, the KPÖ, the Greens and the SPÖ announced their coalition: Graz gets a communist mayor with Elke Kahr.

=== Recent elections ===
In the 2005 elections for the federal state's parliament the SPÖ under their regional chairman Franz Voves won the majority after the ÖVP had damaged its credibility through scandals and the secession of a high-ranking party member, who took part in the 2005 elections after setting up his own party. In these elections, the KPÖ also received many votes after it had gained much popularity through its role in local politics in Graz during the preceding years. The two right-wing populist parties, the Freedom Party of Austria (FPÖ) and the Alliance for the Future of Austria (BZÖ), failed to win seats.

In subsequent elections in 2010 and 2015, the SPÖ, the ÖVP, and the KPÖ each lost between one fourth and one third of their shares of the vote relative to 2005. The FPÖ grew from 4.6 percent to 26.8 percent.

In the last state election in 2024, the far-right Freedom Party reached first place for the first time with 34.8 percent of the vote. The current government of Styria is a coalition of FPÖ and ÖVP. The governor, Mario Kunasek, is a representative of the FPÖ. His deputy, Manuela Khom, is a ÖVP member.

== Notable Styrians ==
- Ulrich von Liechtenstein (c. 1200 – 1275), minnesinger
- Ottokar aus der Gaal (1265–1318/22), wrote Steirische Reimchronik (Styrian Rhyming Chronicle) - the first extensive work on history in the German language
- Palman (fl. 1310–1363), knight and mercenary commander of the Serbian Empire
- Johann Joseph Fux (1660–1741), composer and music theorist, wrote Gradus ad Parnassum – a composition manual used by Beethoven and Mozart
- Joseph von Hammer-Purgstall (1774–1856), pioneer of oriental studies
- Archduke John of Austria (1782–1859)
- Peter Rosegger (1843–1918), honoured writer and poet
- Robert Fuchs (1847–1927), composer and music pedagogue
- Hugo Wolf (1860–1903), Lied composer
- Johann Puch (1862–1914), founded Johann Puch Erste Steiermärkische Fahrrad-Fabriks-Aktiengesellschaft at Graz in 1899.
- August Musger (1868–1929), inventor of slow-motion
- Robert Stolz (1880–1975), composer
- Victor Franz Hess (1883–1964), Nobel Prize winning physicist
- Karl Böhm, (1894–1981), conductor
- Erik von Kuehnelt-Leddihn (1909–1999), political scientist
- Bert Isatitsch (1911–1994), first president of the International Luge Federation
- Nikolaus Harnoncourt, (1929–2016), conductor
- Frank Stronach (b. 1932), founder of Magna International, billionaire
- Jochen Rindt (1942–1970), Formula 1 World Champion
- Helmut Marko (b. 1943), former racing driver
- Dietrich Mateschitz (1944–2022), founder and CEO of Red Bull
- Klaus Maria Brandauer (b. 1944), actor and director
- Elfriede Jelinek (b. 1946), Nobel Prize in Literature winner
- Arnold Schwarzenegger (b. 1947), bodybuilder, film actor and former Governor of California
- Hugo Eberhardt (1948) (b. 1948), leader in the field of technical safety
- Getty Kaspers (b. 1948), lead vocals of Dutch band Teach-In, who won the 1975 Eurovision Song Contest.
- Eva Rueber-Staier (b. 1951), Miss Austria 1969, Miss World 1969
- Herbert Walzl (1959–2022), stage actor, theatre director and playwright
- Robert Gruber (b. 1962), founder of band Kinky Slinky
- Wolfgang Muthspiel (b. 1965), jazz composer and guitarist
- Ulla Weigerstorfer (b. 1967), Miss Austria 1987 and Miss World 1987
- Thomas Muster (b. 1967), former World No. 1 tennis player
- Renate Götschl (b. 1975), alpine skiing World Champion
- Elisabeth Görgl (b. 1981), professional alpine skier
- Christoph Strasser (b. 1982), champion ultra cyclist
- Conchita Wurst (b. 1988), singer and winner of the Eurovision Song Contest 2014

== See also ==
- Lower Styria
