= Oskar Kogoj =

Slovene industrial designer (born 1942)

Oskar Andrej Kogoj (born 23 November 1942) is a Slovene industrial designer.

== Biography ==
Oskar Kogoj was born in Miren, then part of the Kingdom of Yugoslavia. He went to a high school that specialises in design in Ljubljana and studied in the industrial design program (Italian: Corso Superiore di Disegno Industriale) at the Art Institute of Venice (Italian: Istituto Statale d'Arte di Venezia). He graduated in 1966.

Until 1969, he was employed at the institute as an advisor for the company Baby Mark in Milan. During 1969 and 1970, he worked at the Research and Design Department of the Meblo furniture company in Nova Gorica. He was the supervisor of the Department of Industrial Design at the International University of Florence and Venice from 1971 to 1975. As a freelance designer, he also designed children's toys for the company Ciciban and has more recently focused on various objects made out of natural materials, particularly glass, all the way from simple glasses up to the Venetian horse, which includes revelations during the research of millennial cultures.

His work is displayed at over 100 museums and collections around the globe. Since 1969, he has received over 40 international awards and recognitions. In 1971, he received the Prešeren Fund Award for a series of armchair loungers he designed alongside Stane Bernik, Janko Sušnik and Boris Ferlat and were produced by Meblo. He is also a member of multiple international design and art associations, a list which includes the renowned Circolo Artistico Veneziano from 1996.
