= Allio =

Allio is an Italian surname. People with this surname include:

- René Allio (1924–1995), French film director
- Matteo di Guaro Allio (1605–1670), Italian sculptor
- Domenico dell'Allio (1505–1563), Italian architect.
- Donato Felice d'Allio (1677–1761), Austrian architect

Allio may also refer to:

- AlLiO_{2}, the chemical formula for lithium aluminate

== See also ==
- Aglio, a similar surname
