= Di Matteo =

Di Matteo may refer to:

As a last name:

- Alessia di Matteo, the first person in history to survive the transplantation of eight organs in a single operation
- Luca Di Matteo, an Italian football midfielder
- Roberto Di Matteo, a former Italian professional footballer, and former manager of Chelsea F.C. and FC Schalke 04
- Santino Di Matteo, a member of the Mafia from the town of Altofonte

As a middle name:

- Bernardo di Matteo Gamberelli, an Italian sculptor
- Filippo di Matteo Torelli, an Italian painter
- Michele di Matteo Lambertini, an Italian painter

As a first name:

- Matteo di Andrea de' Pasti, an Italian sculptor
- Matteo di Guaro Allio, an Italian sculptor

As a business name:

- DiMatteo Vineyards, a winery in New Jersey
