= Aglio =

Aglio (Italian for "garlic") is a surname. People with this surname include:

- Andrea-Salvatore Aglio (1736–1786), Italian painter and sculptor
- Agostino Aglio (1777–1857), Italian painter
- Domenico Aglio (active 1710), Italian sculptor

== See also ==
- Allio – similar surname
