= Pius Parsch =

Czech Catholic priest (1884–1954)

Pius Parsch, born John Bruno Parsch (May 18, 1884 – March 11, 1954) was a priest of the Roman Catholic Church.

Parsch was born in Neustift near Olmutz, Moravia, in what is now the Czech Republic. He was given the name Pius when he entered the community of Canons Regular in Klosterneuburg Abbey. He was a leading figure in the Liturgical Movement, publishing the results of recent liturgical scholarship in popularly accessible books in German. Some of these were translated into English, including The Liturgy of the Mass (Herder, 1940), The Breviary Explained (id., 1952), and The Church's Year of Grace (Liturgical Press, 1953).

Parsch promoted the "volksliturgischen" or "People's Mass". This early practice of the liturgical renewal was notable for celebration at a free standing altar with the priest facing the people (which he instituted at St. Gertrud Kirche), gothic vestments and an emphasis on the liturgical seasons rather than the calendar of the saints. These features were all permitted but uncommon prior to Vatican Council II.

Parsch died on in Klosterneuburg, aged 69.

== Bibliography ==
- Kurze Meßerklärung (1930)
- Lernet die Messe verstehen (1931)
- The Liturgy of the Mass (St. Louis: Herder, 1936)
- Die liturgische Predigt: Wortverkündigung im Geiste der liturgischen Erneuerung (1940)
- La Sainte Messe expliquée dans son histoire et sa liturgie (Bruges, 1951)
- Wie halteich bibelstunde (Klosterneuburger bibelapostolat, 1951)
- The Breviary Explained (St. Louis: Herder, 1936)
- Brevierschule für Laien (1939)
- Sermons on the Liturgy for Sundays and Feast Days (Milwaukee: Bruce, 1953)
- Le Guide dans l'année liturgique (1954)
- Study the Mass (Collegeville: Liturgical Press, 1962)
- Learning to Read the Bible (Collegeville: Liturgical Press, 1963)
- The Parish Bible-Class (Collegeville: Liturgical Press, 1963)
- Seasons of Grace (Herder and Herder, 1963)

== Sources ==
- Autobiographical chapter in The Book of Catholic Authors.
