= Klosterneuburg Abbey =

Augustinian monastery in Klosterneuberg, Austria

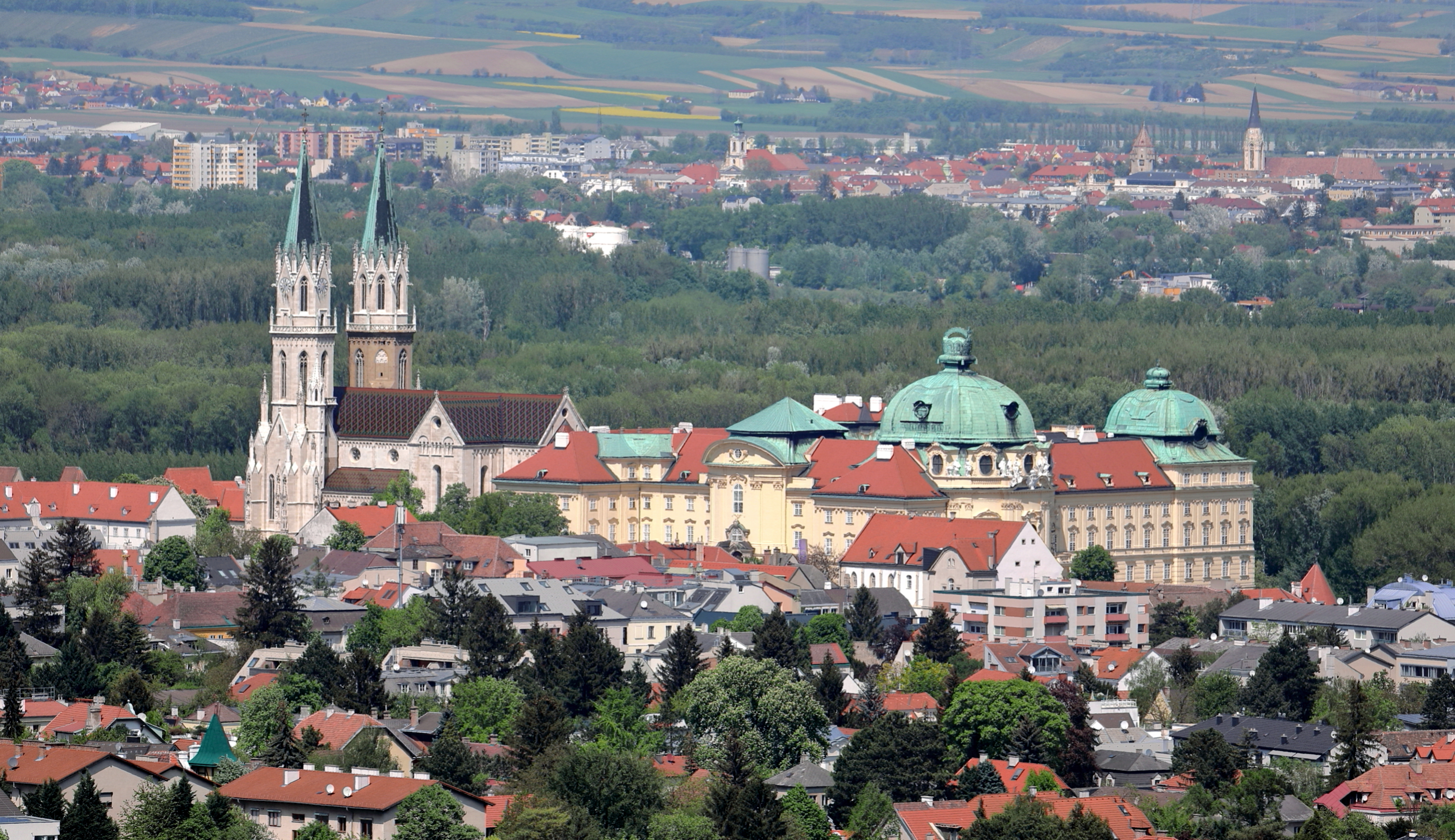
- Klosterneuburg Abbey seen from south

- Location within Austria

Religion
- Affiliation: Catholic
- Ecclesiastical or organisational status: Monastery
- Year consecrated: 1136
- Status: Active

Location
- Location: Klosterneuburg, Austria
- State: Lower Austria
- Coordinates: 48°18′26″N 16°19′33″E

Architecture
- Type: Monastery
- Style: Gothic, Baroque
- Founder: Saint Leopold III
- Groundbreaking: 1114
- Spire: 2

Website
- www.stift-klosterneuburg.at/en

Klosterneuburg Abbey (German: Stift Klosterneuburg) is a twelfth-century Augustinian monastery of the Catholic Church located in the town of Klosterneuburg in Lower Austria. Overlooking the Danube, just north of the present Vienna city limits at the Leopoldsberg, the monastery was founded in 1114 by Saint Leopold III of Babenberg, the patron saint of Austria, and his second wife Agnes of Germany.

The abbey church, dedicated the Nativity of Mary (Mariä Geburt), was consecrated in 1136 and remodeled in the Baroque style in the seventeenth century. The impressive monastery complex was mostly constructed between 1730 and 1834. Its foundations, including a castle tower and a Gothic chapel, date back to the twelfth century. Other older buildings still extant within the complex include the chapel of 1318 with Saint Leopold's tomb. From 1634 on, the Habsburg rulers had the facilities rebuilt in the Baroque style, continued by the architects Jakob Prandtauer and Donato Felice d'Allio. The plans to embellish the monastery on the scale of an Austrian Escorial were later resumed by the Neoclassical architect Joseph Kornhäusel, though only small parts were actually carried out. In 1879, the abbey church and monastery were restored according to plans by Friedrich von Schmidt, and the neo-Gothic twin steeples were erected.

Klosterneuburg Monastery contains the Verduner Altar, made in 1181 by Nicholas of Verdun. Its three parts comprise 45 gilded copper plates modeled on Byzantine paragons, similar to the Shrine of the Three Kings at Cologne Cathedral. The monastery also contains a museum with a collection of Gothic and Baroque sculptures and a gallery of paintings, including fifteen-panel paintings by Rueland Frueauf from 1505, four Passion paintings from the backside of the Verduner Altar from 1331, and the Babenberg genealogical tree.

== History ==
During the Investiture Controversy in the early twelfth century, Margrave Leopold III of Babenberg sided with the Papacy against Emperor Henry IV. In 1106, the emperor's son, Emperor Henry V, who sided with the Papacy against his father, rewarded Leopold's loyalty by offering him his sister Agnes' hand in marriage, in recognition of his services. Agnes was the widow of Duke Frederick I of Swabia. Leopold, who was recently widowed from his first wife, accepted the hand of this daughter of the Imperial Salian dynasty.

With this new connection to two imperial families, Leopold's status was elevated by the marriage, which also brought with it a large dowry of royal possessions. Following his marriage, Leopold initiated plans to build a castle on Leopoldsberg for his new residence, which had formerly been at Gars am Kamp and Tulln an der Donau. He named the new castle Niwenburc. According to legend, Leopold was standing with his wife on the balcony of their new castle when Agnes' veil was carried away by a strong gust of wind. The area was searched, but the veil was not found. Years later, Leopold was out hunting when he became attracted by a brilliant radiance coming from the foliage of an elderbush. The source of the light was the undamaged veil, entangled in the foliage. From the light emerged a vision of the Virgin Mary, who directed Leopold to build a church and monastery in her honour at that location.

In 1113, Leopold founded a monastery (kloster) for secular canons next to his castle, providing it with generous donations of land. The cornerstone ceremony for the new abbey church took place on 12 June 1114. Leopold's younger son, the chronicler Otto of Freising, prepared for his ecclesiastical career at Klosterneuburg and became provost in 1126. In 1133, Leopold handed the monastery over to the Augustinians after repossessing it from the secular canons. Leopold sought to create an impressive but private monastery next to his residence.

On 29 September 1136, the abbey church was consecrated after 22 years of construction. The form of that original basilica has survived for nine centuries, despite many subsequent modifications and reconstructions. Most likely the two side aisles had lofts, the middle aisle was most likely higher, and above the crossing there was a tower. Two months after the consecration, Margrave Leopold III died on 15 November 1136. Agnes survived him by seven years. In 1156, Duke Henry II of Austria moved his residence from Klosterneuburg to Vienna after receiving the ducal title. Despite the change, the monastery continued to develop as a religious and cultural institution.

In 1220, Duke Leopold VI of Austria selected a Burgundian master architect to build the Capella Speziosa chapel beside the convent. This chapel, considered among the most beautiful sacred buildings of its time, was demolished in the eighteenth century. On 13 September 1330, the town and monastery were seriously damaged in a fire. The monastery and abbey church were renovated, and new works of art were commissioned by provost Stephan of Sierndorf. In 1394, construction began on the south tower of the early-Gothic abbey church. It would take two centuries before the tower was completed in 1592.

On 6 January 1485, Leopold III was canonized by Pope Innocent VIII. As a result, Klosterneuburg soon became an important pilgrimage site. Throughout the fifteenth century, the Augustinian canons had devoted themselves to humanistic studies and the sciences, especially geography and astronomy. During the various wars of that period, especially the Ottoman sieges of Vienna in 1529 and 1679, the monastery suffered severe damage. In the sixteenth century, the Protestant Reformation posed another threat to the monastery, as its influence led to reduced numbers—at one point leaving the monastery in the care of only seven canons. The success of the Counter-Reformation during the seventeenth century strengthened and renewed the monastery.

Between 1634 and 1645, the first phase of remodeling the abbey church in the Baroque style took place. Artists from northern Italy were brought in to work on the project, under the guidance of Giovanni Battista Carlone. In 1636, the crossing tower was demolished. Between 1638 and 1644, the north tower of the abbey church was constructed. In 1644, a 6000-kg bell was cast and installed in the north tower, named Leopoldiglocke, after Saint Leopold III. The second phase of remodeling the abbey church in the Baroque style took place between 1680 and 1702.

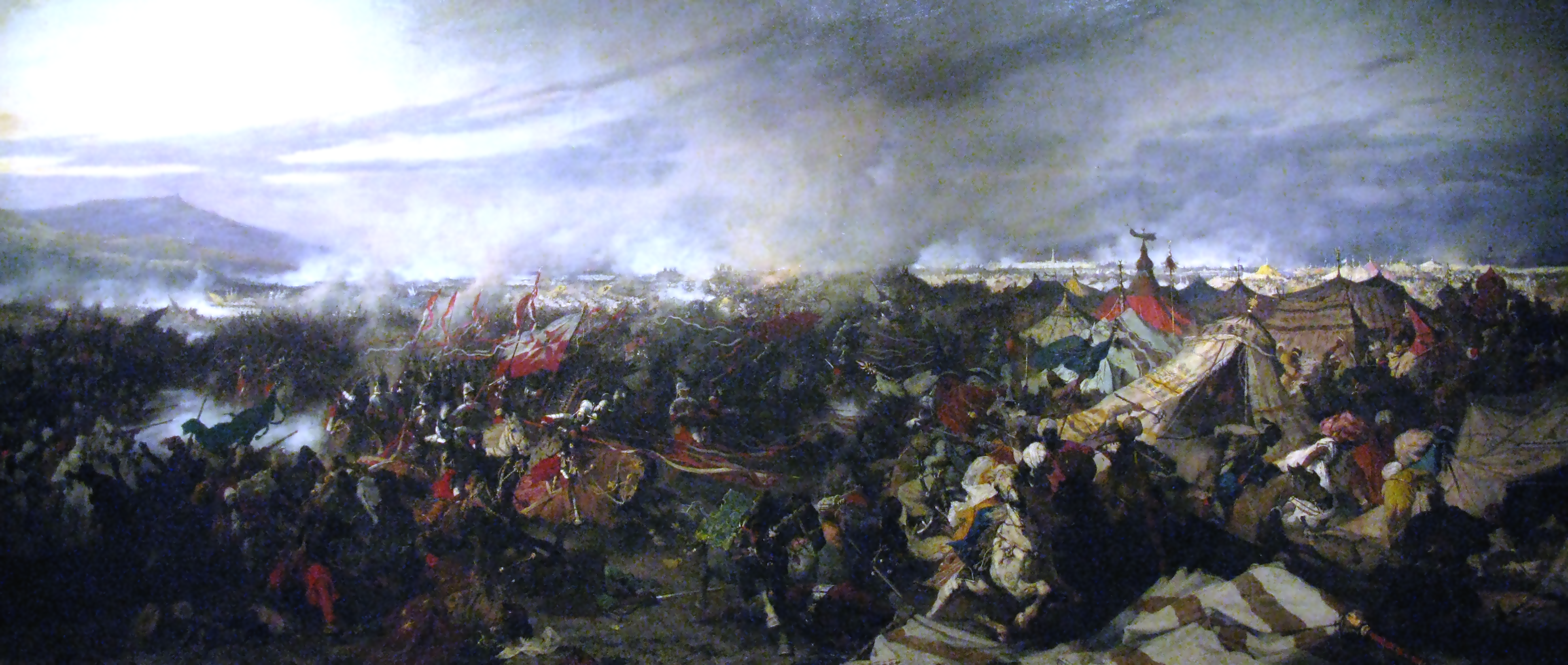
Battle of Vienna by Józef Brandt

In the fall of 1683, a massive Ottoman army under the leadership of Kara Mustafa Pasha laid siege to Vienna and threatened Klosterneuburg. Most of the town and monastery escaped with the members of the imperial court, but two men—one priest and one lay brother—remained behind with the citizens to defend the town and monastery. The lower part of the town was surrendered to the attackers, but the upper part and the monastery were defended successfully. The defense of Klosterneuburg turned out to be strategically important because it served as flank protection during the rescue of Vienna by the Christian forces under the leadership of King John III Sobieski.

The final phase of remodeling the abbey church in the Baroque style took place between 1723 and 1730. During this period, the presbytery, choir stalls, high altar, court oratorio, and pews were all remodeled. In 1730, construction of the monastery in the Baroque style began with the Imperial Edifice. The idea of making Klosterneuburg the most impressive religious structure in Austria dated back to the Middle Ages with Saint Leopold III and Leopold VI. Emperor Charles VI now sought to make Klosterneuburg a secular and spiritual center after the model of the Escorial in Spain. Construction of the monastery continued for ten years, under Donato Felice d'Allio, who was inspired by Joseph Emanuel Fischer von Erlach, the master architect of Vienna at the time. With the death of Emperor Charles VI in 1740, building activity was discontinued. Only the east and north wings of the monastery complex were finished—about one eighth of the planned construction.

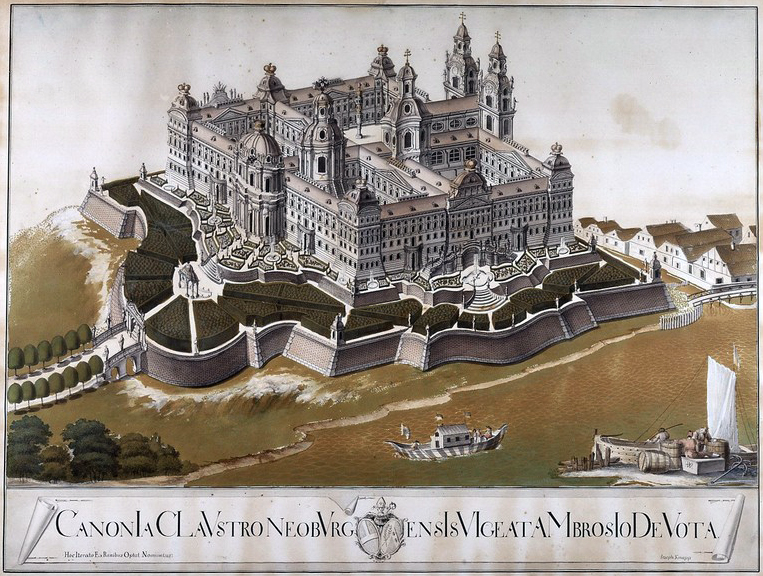
Planned appearance of Klosterneuburg Monastery after extension (1774)

In 1768, the theological academy at the monastery was founded. The accession of Emperor Joseph II as Archduke of Austria in 1780 marked a change in the Empire's relationship with the Church. Inspired by the Age of Enlightenment, Joseph was anxious to reduce the power of the church, to relieve the peasantry of feudal burdens, and to remove restrictions on trade and knowledge. During this period, the monastery increased its pastoral work in creating new parsonages and making available to poor citizens certain monastery properties on the outskirts of Vienna. In gratitude, some of the new Vienna suburbs were named after monastery provosts, for example, Floridsdorf (named for Floridus Leeb) and Gaudenzdorf (named for Gaudenz Dunkler).

In 1836, construction of the monastery resumed, and by 1842, the residential wing, the south wing, and the west wing were finished by Neoclassical architect Joseph Kornhäusel from Vienna. Only two of the planned nine domes were completed. The main dome bears the imperial crown, and the smaller dome the archducal crown. In 1879, a major restoration project was initiated, according to plans by Friedrich von Schmidt. During this period, the vestry and choir chapel were erected, as well as the neo-Gothic twin steeples. Between 1898 and 1901, the mural paintings in the side chapels were created by Karl Peyfuss. In 1911, the course of the Danube was regulated to its current location, about two kilometers from the monastery. In 1936, the abbey church was granted the title Basilica minor by Pope Pius XI.

Among the most notable of priests of the abbey was Father Pius Parsch, who promoted the "volksliturgischen" or "People's Mass". This early practice of the liturgical renewal was notable for celebration at a free standing altar with the priest facing the people, gothic vestments and an emphasis on the liturgical seasons rather than the calendar of the saints. These features were all permitted but uncommon prior to Vatican Council II.

The Anschluss of 1938 brought devastation to the Klosterneuburg community. In 1941, the Nazis suppressed the canonry and confiscated the buildings and properties. Only a few canons were permitted to remain and continue ministering to the faithful. Some canons went out into the parishes, others were drafted into the army, and many lost their lives because of their involvement in the resistance movement. Immediately after the war, some canons were murdered for standing up against the Russian soldiers who preyed on Austrian women and girls. Provost Alipius Linda, elected in 1937, guided the community wisely through both the Nazi period and the subsequent Communist occupation.

During the post-war period, Provost Gebhard Koberger presided over the rebuilding of the abbey's financial condition, as well as the reconstruction of several of the monastery's churches which had been damaged or destroyed by the bombing. Provost Gebhard was elected Abbot General of the Austrian Congregation and attended the Second Vatican Council. In 1969, he was elected Abbot Primate of the Confederation of Augustinian Canons. In 1985, on the celebration of his golden jubilee of priesthood, Provost Gebhard inaugurated the Provost Gebhard Koberger Institute for Research on the Augustinian Canons. He resigned due to poor health in 1995, and died in 1997.

== Verdun Altar ==
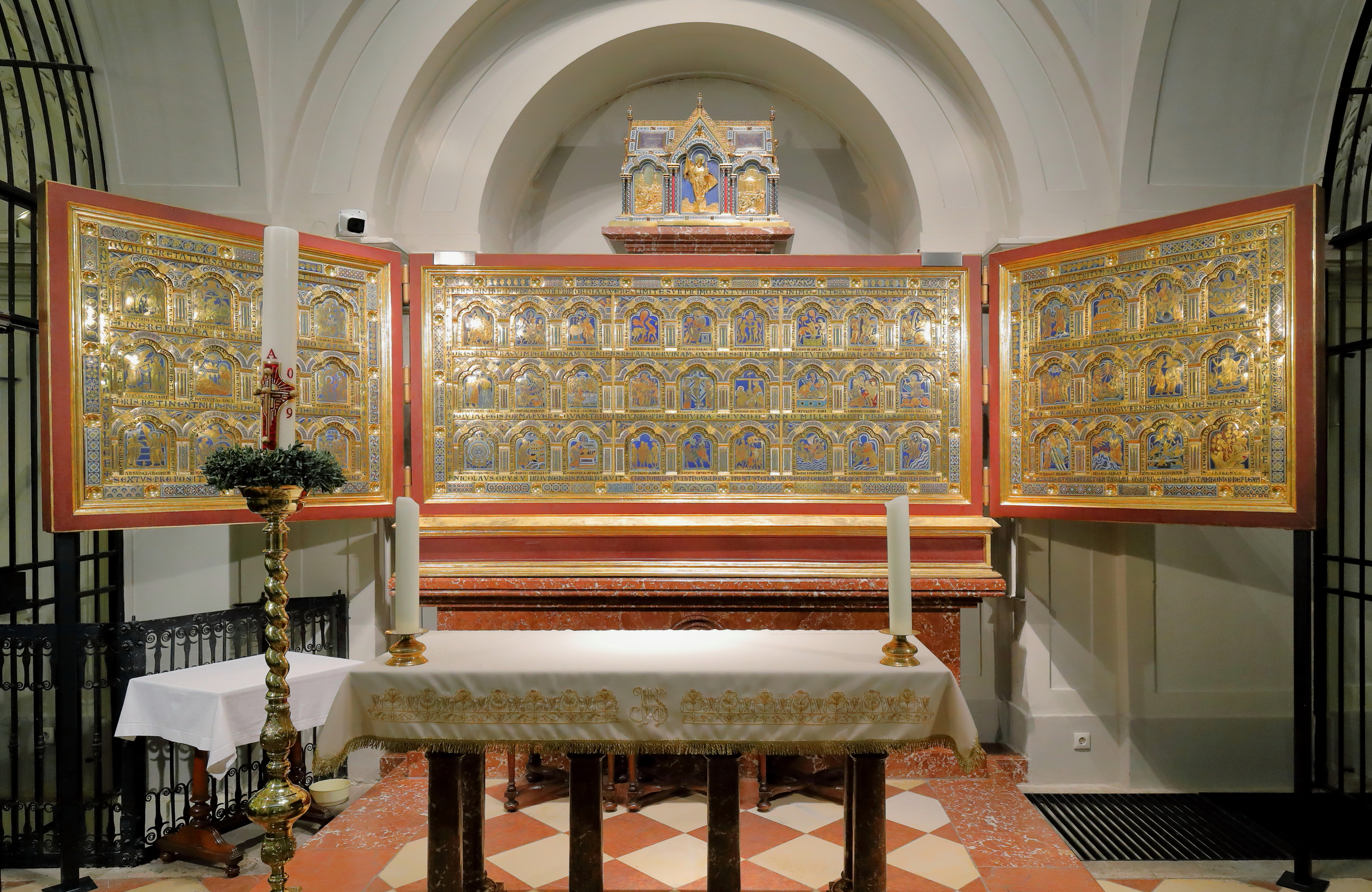
Verdun Altar

The chapel of St Leopold contains the Verdun Altar made in 1181 by Nicholas of Verdun. Its three parts comprise 51 gilded copper plates modeled on Byzantine paragons, similar to the Shrine of the Three Kings at Cologne Cathedral. Originally manufactured as panels, they were assembled as an altar in secondary utilization circa 1330.

The tripartite concept is reflected in the arrangement of the plates. According to the biblical exegesis, the depictions are split into three rows of the eras of Adam and Noah, of Abraham, David and the Babylonian captivity and finally of Jesus' life, placed in the central part. The columns of adjacent plates of different ages symbolise their connection according to the ideas of the typology theory. The arrangement may refer to the mystic doctrines of the medieval theologian Hugh of Saint Victor. American scholar Elfie Raymond, professor of philosophy and hermeneutics at Sarah Lawrence College of New York produced an online catalog of the typology of virtues found in the theological program.

== Wine ==
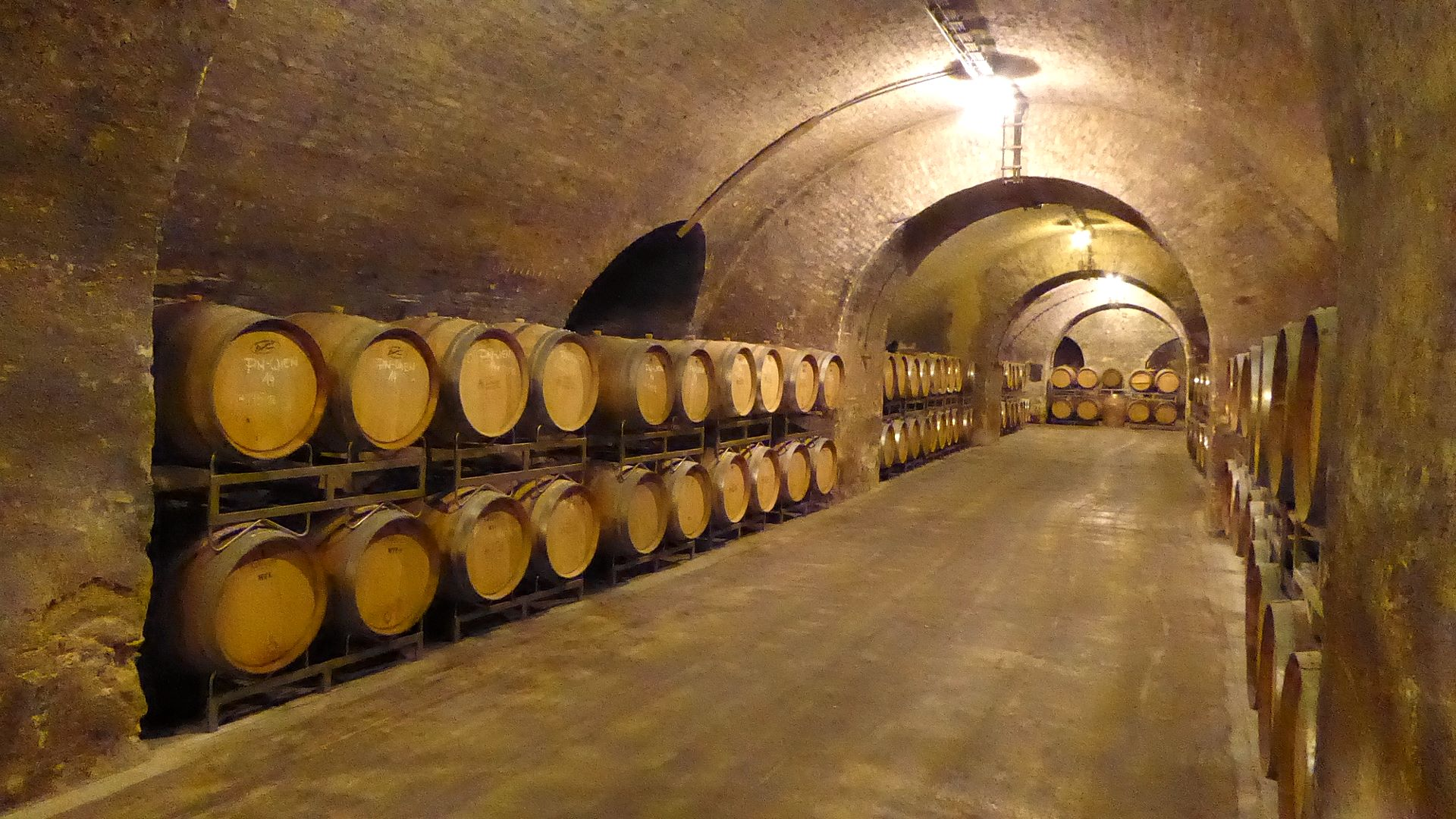
Large wine barrels in the cellars of the abbey

The abbey has produced fine wine since its foundation. The abbey owns large amount of lands for vineyards around the region, with its wine prized amongst sommeliers. Klosterneuburg's vineyards were also the first ones to be certified carbon neutral in the country. The region itself has received investment from the federal government.

== Social commitment ==
In accordance with the social statute of the foundation issued in 2000, annually at least 10% of the profits generated in the commercial enterprises are used for social purposes. A known social project is the Concordia project by the Jesuit father Georg Sporschill, which helps almost 100 Romanian street children and supports the elderly in Moldova. Smaller campaigns such as child protection centers in India and Honduras, women's aid projects in Afghanistan or an eye clinic in South Sudan are also funded.

== Provosts ==
Klosterneuburg has had 66 provosts in its history. With the exception of two four-year lapses at the end of the sixteenth and beginning of the seventeenth centuries, the community has enjoyed stable and continual self–governance for nearly 900 years.

1. Otto I (1114–1126, secular)
2. Otto II (1126–1132, secular)
3. Opold (1132–1133, secular)
4. Hartmann I of Polling (1133–1140)
5. Marquard I of Polling (1140–1167)
6. Rudiger I of Polling (1167–1168)
7. Wernher (1168–1185, 1192–1194)
8. Gottschalk (1185–1192)
9. Otto III (1194)
10. Rudolf I (1194–1195)
11. Dietrich Purger (1195–1216)
12. Wisinto (1216–1219)
13. Walther (1220–1224)
14. Marquard II (1224–1226)
15. Konrad Goltstein of Vienna (1226–1257)
16. Nikolaus I (1257–1279)
17. Pabo (1279–1291, 1293)
18. Hadmar the Donkey of Gaaden (1293–1301)
19. Rudiger II (1301–1306)
20. Berthold I (1306–1317)
21. Stephen of Sierndorf (1317–1335)
22. Nikolaus II of Neidhart (1335–1336)
23. Rudwein von Knappen of Haselbach (1336–1349)
24. Ortolf of Wolkersdorf (1349–1371)
25. Koloman of Laa (1371–1394)
26. Peter I Lenhofer (1394–1399)
27. Bartholomaeus of Pierbaum (1399–1409)
28. Albert Stöck (1409–1418)
29. Georg I Muestinger of Petronell (1418–1442)
30. Simon I vom Thurm of Klosterneuburg (1442–1451)
31. Simon II Heindl (1451–1465)
32. Johannes Hechtl (1465–1485)
33. Jakob I Paperl (1485–1509)
34. Georg II Hausmanstetter (1509–1541)
35. Wolfgang Hayden of Klosterneuburg (1541–1551)
36. Christoph I Starl of Klosterneuburg (1551–1558)
37. Peter II Hübner (1558–1563)
38. Leopold Hintermayr of Hochwang (1563–1577)
39. Kaspar Christiani of Arendsee (1578–1584)
40. Balthasar Polzman of Vienna (1584–1596)
41. Thomas Rueff of Vienna (1600–1612)
42. Andreas Mosmiller of Landsberg (1616–1629)
43. Bernhard I Enoch Waitz of Salzungen (1630–1643)
44. Rudolf II Tobias Millner (1643–1648)
45. Bernhard II Schemddingh of Münster (1648–1675)
46. Adam I Scharrer of Krems (1675–1681)
47. Sebastian Mayr of Eberschwang (1681–1686)
48. Christoph II Matthäi of Neustadt (1686–1706)
49. Jakob II Cini (1706–1706)
50. Ernst Johannes Perger of Horn (1707–1748)
51. Berthold II Johannes Paul Staudinger (1749–1766)
52. Gottfried Johannes von Roleman (1766–1772)
53. Ambros Ignaz Lorenz of Vienna (1772–1781)
54. Floridus Johannes Leeb of Nikolsburg (1782–1799)
55. Gaudenz Andreas Dunkler of Piesling (1800–1829)
56. Jakob III Ruttenstock of Vienna (1830–1844)
57. Wilhelm Ludwig Sedlaczek (1844–1853)
58. Adam II Schreck of Vienna (1853–1871)
59. Berthold III Ignaz Froeschl of Weinsteig (1871–1882)
60. Ubald Ewald Kostersitz of Litta (1882–1902)
61. Bernhard III Johannes Peitl (1903–1906)
62. Friedrich Gustav Piffl of Landskron (1907–1913)
63. Joseph Eduard Kluger of Reitendorf (1913–1937)
64. Alipius Joseph Linda of Vienna (1937–1953)
65. Gebhard Ferdinand Koberger of Vienna (1953–1995)
66. Bernhard IV Hermann Backovsky (1995–2023)
67. Anton Höslinger (2023–present)

== Burials ==
- Leopold III, Margrave of Austria
- Agnes of Germany
- Theodora Angelina, Duchess of Austria

== Gallery ==
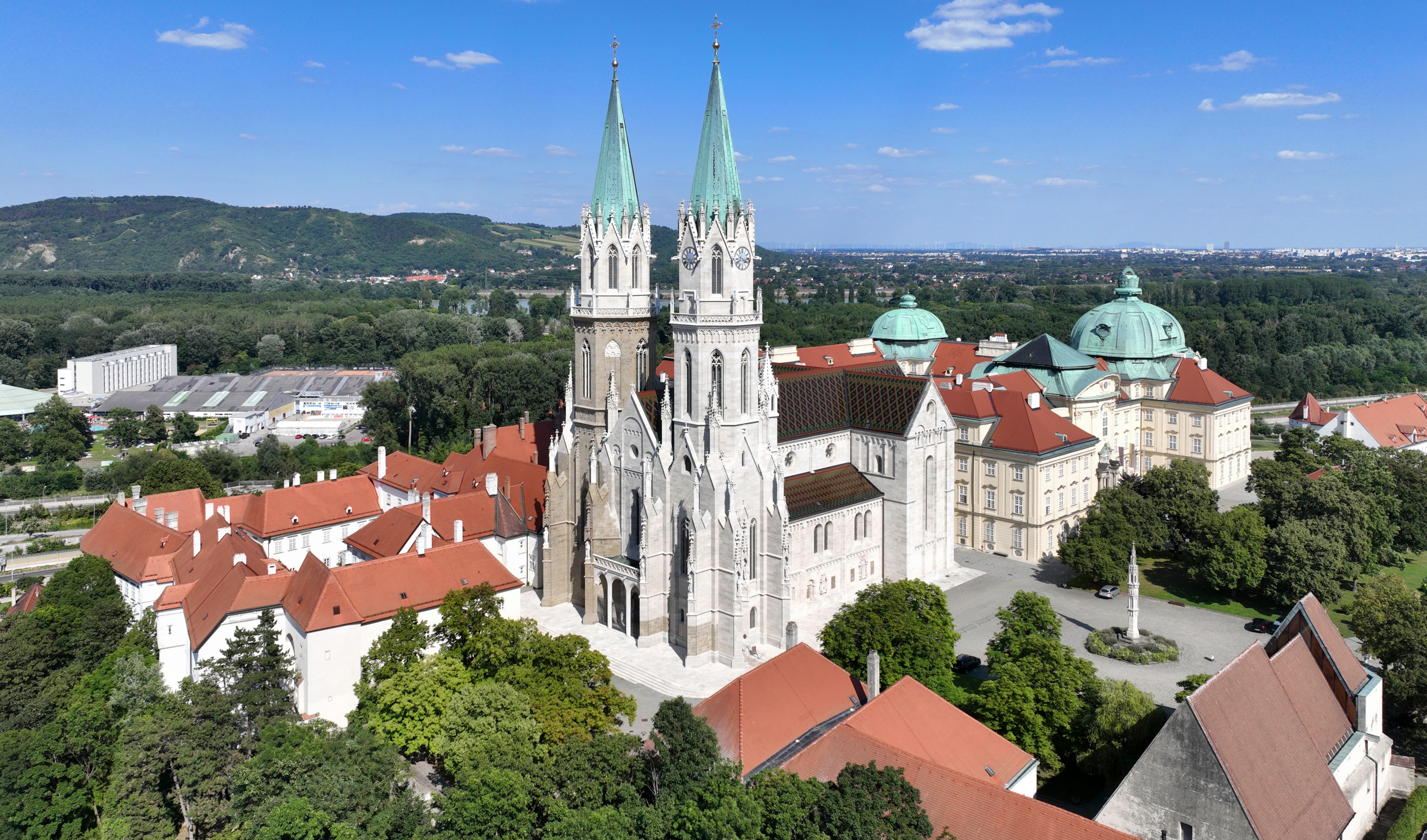
Aerial view of Klosterneuburg Abbey

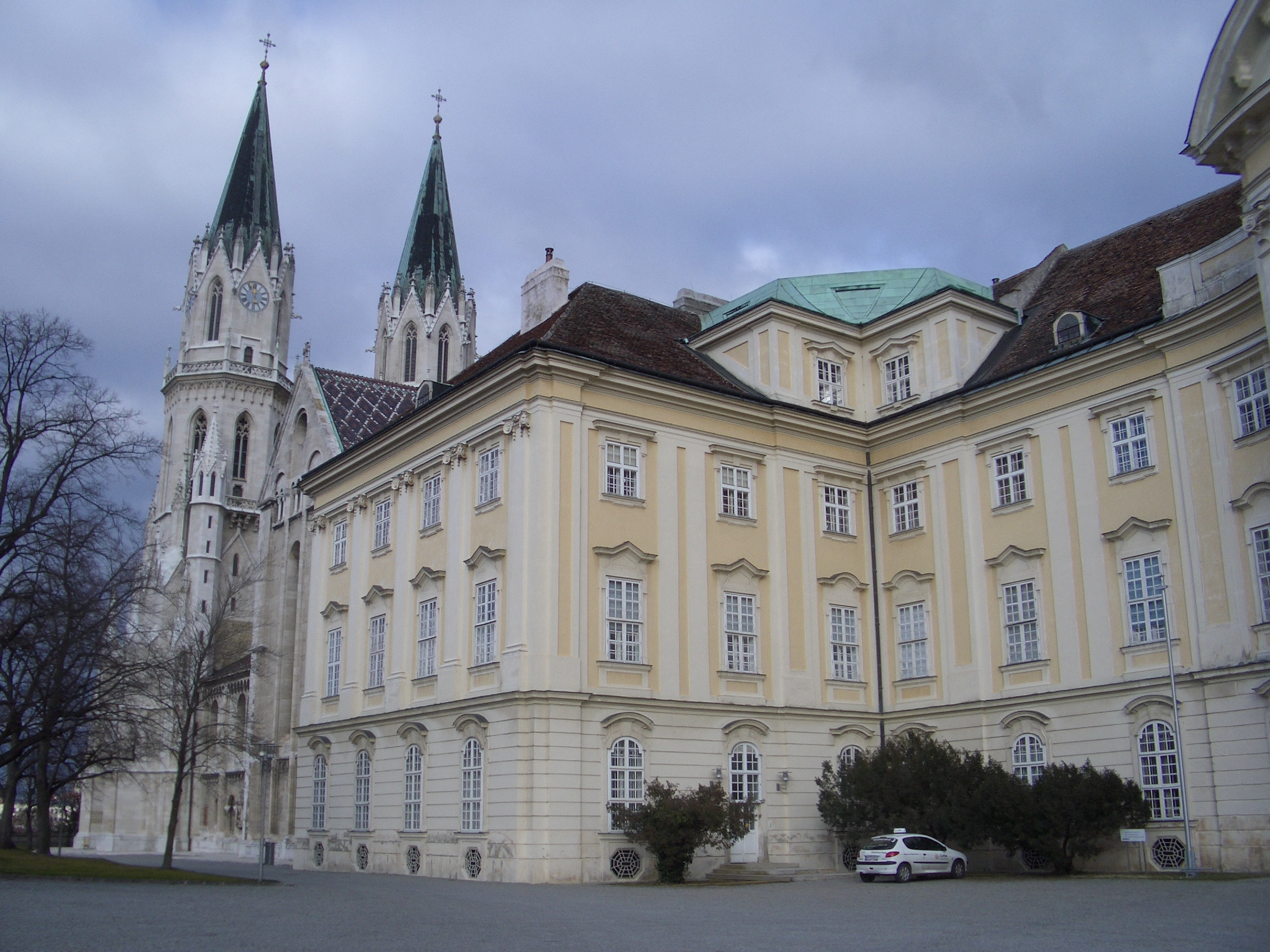
Klosterneuburg Abbey

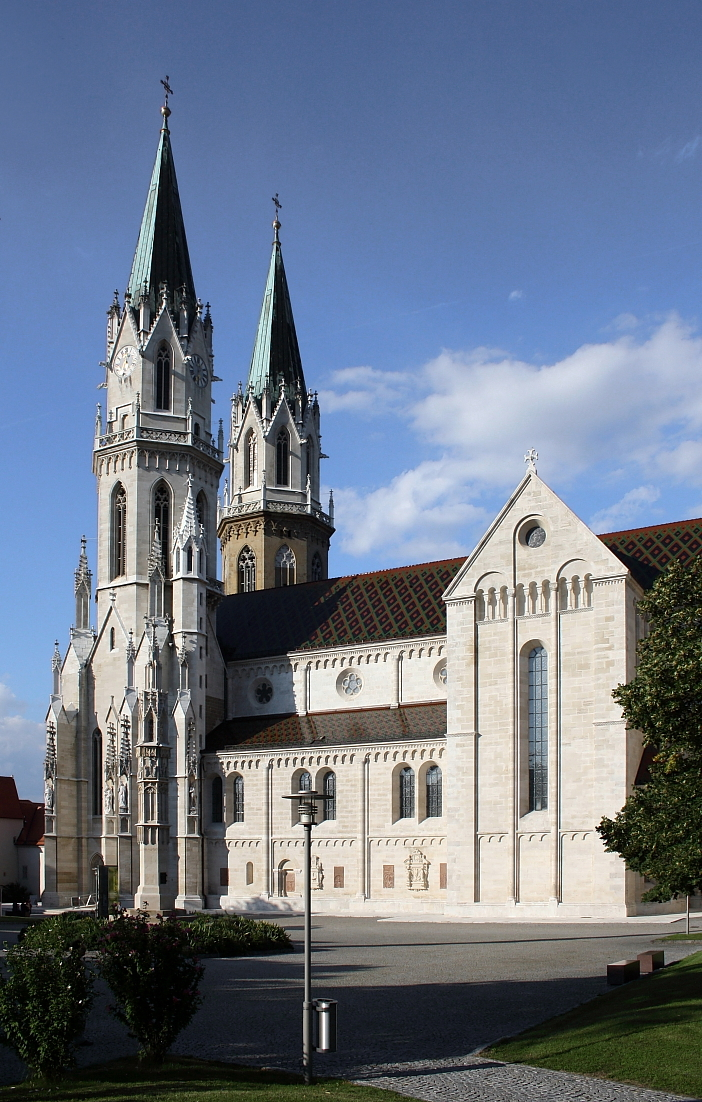
Collegiate church

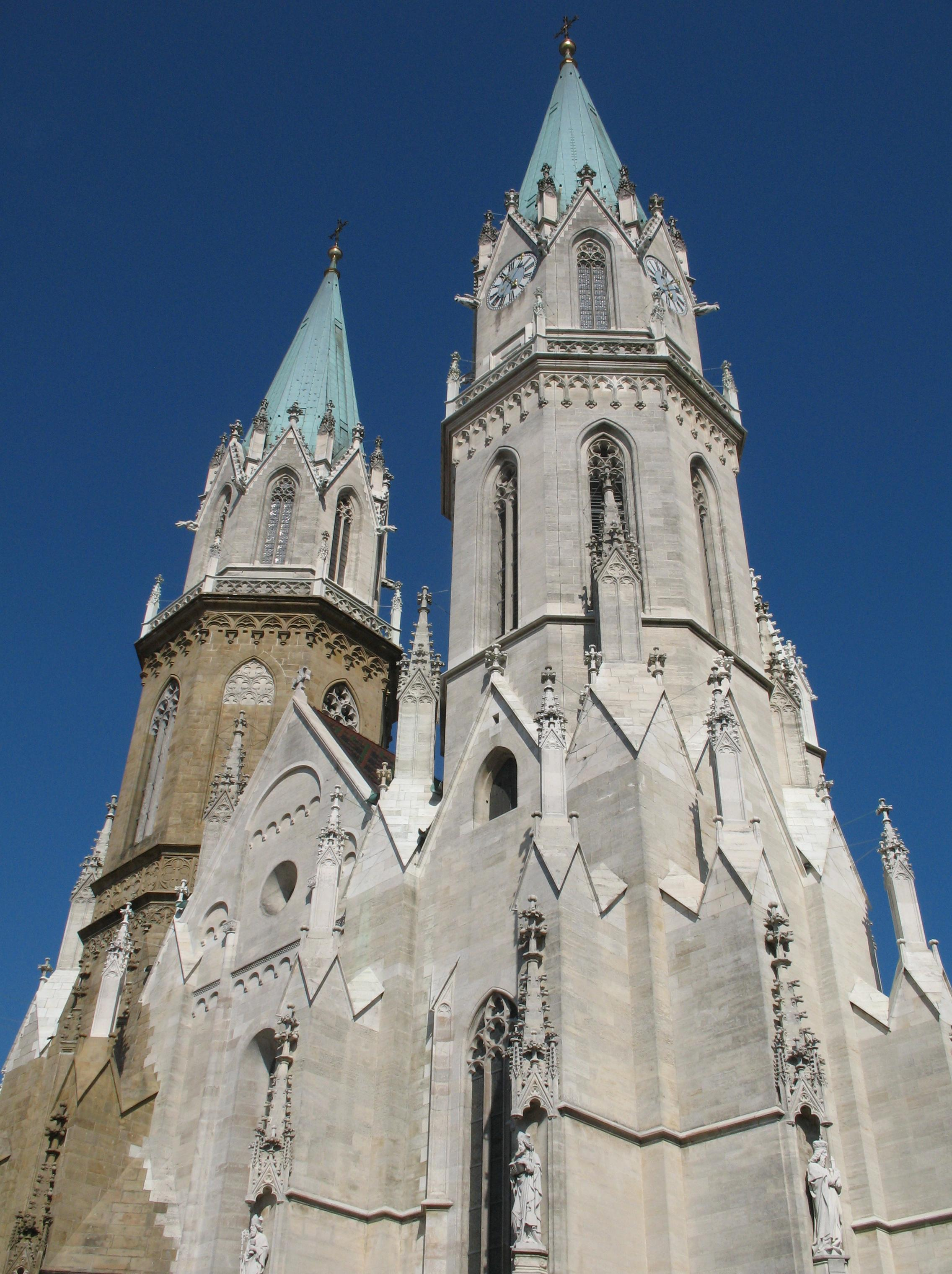
Collegiate church

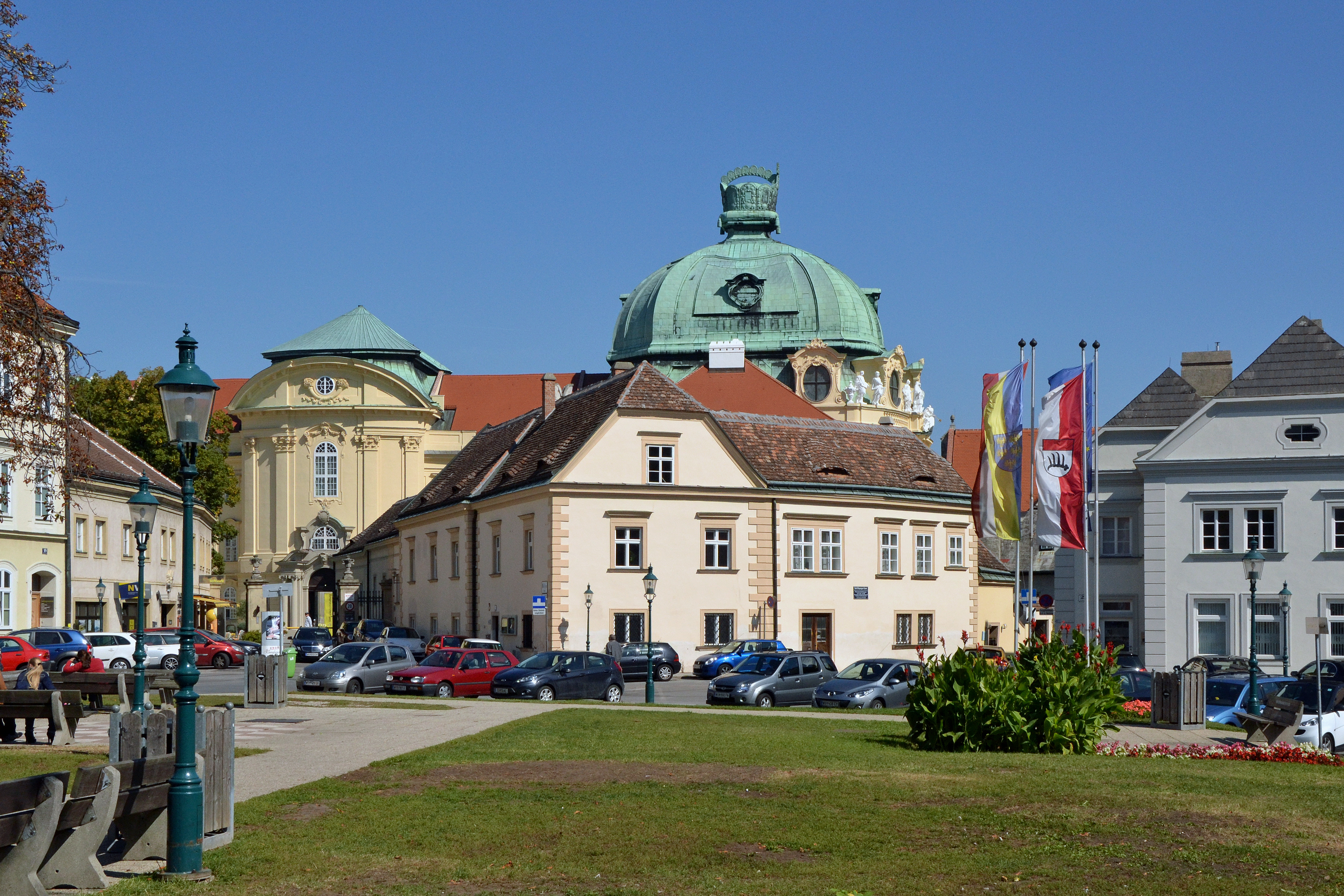
Rathausplatz

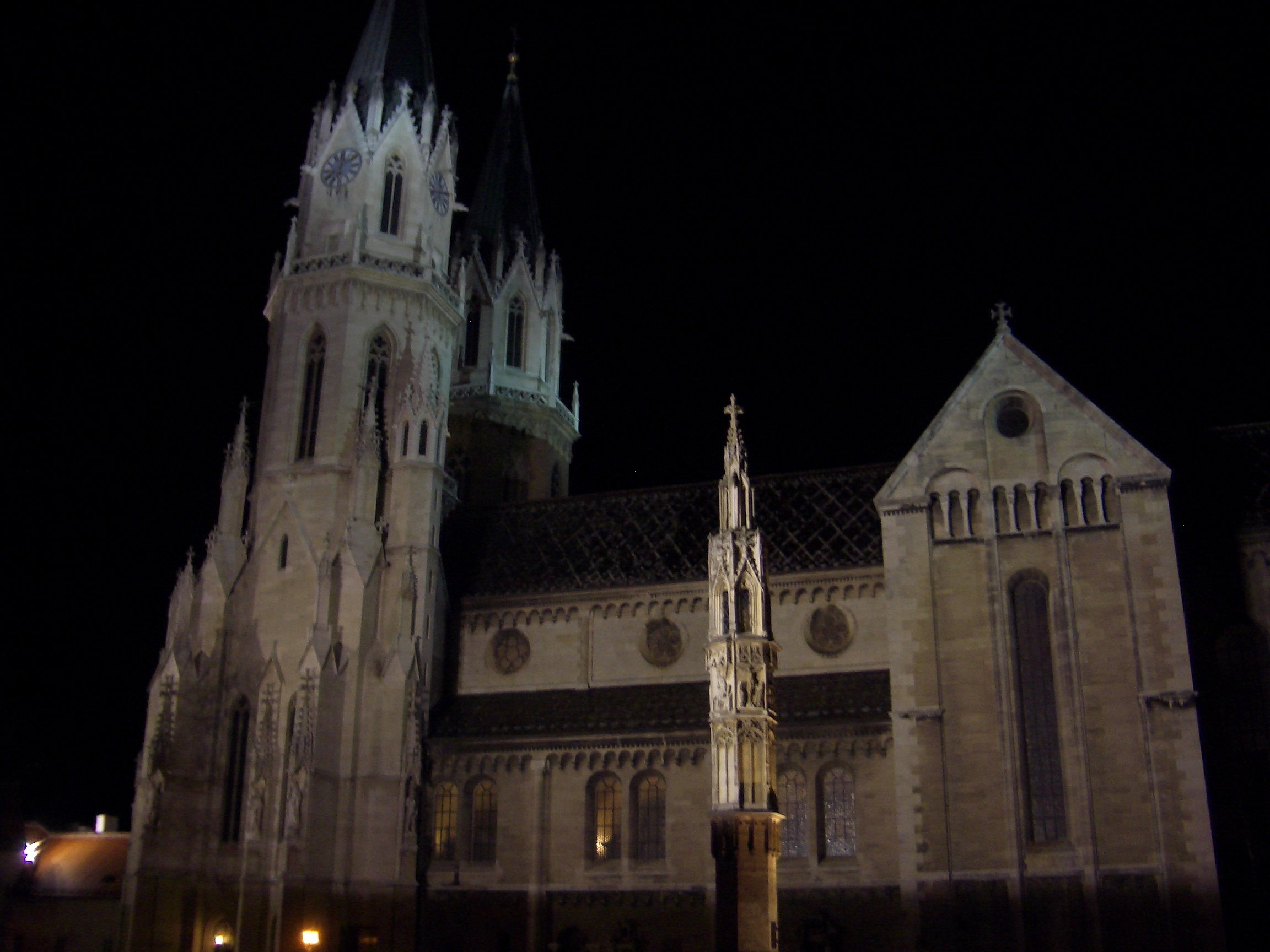
Abbey at night

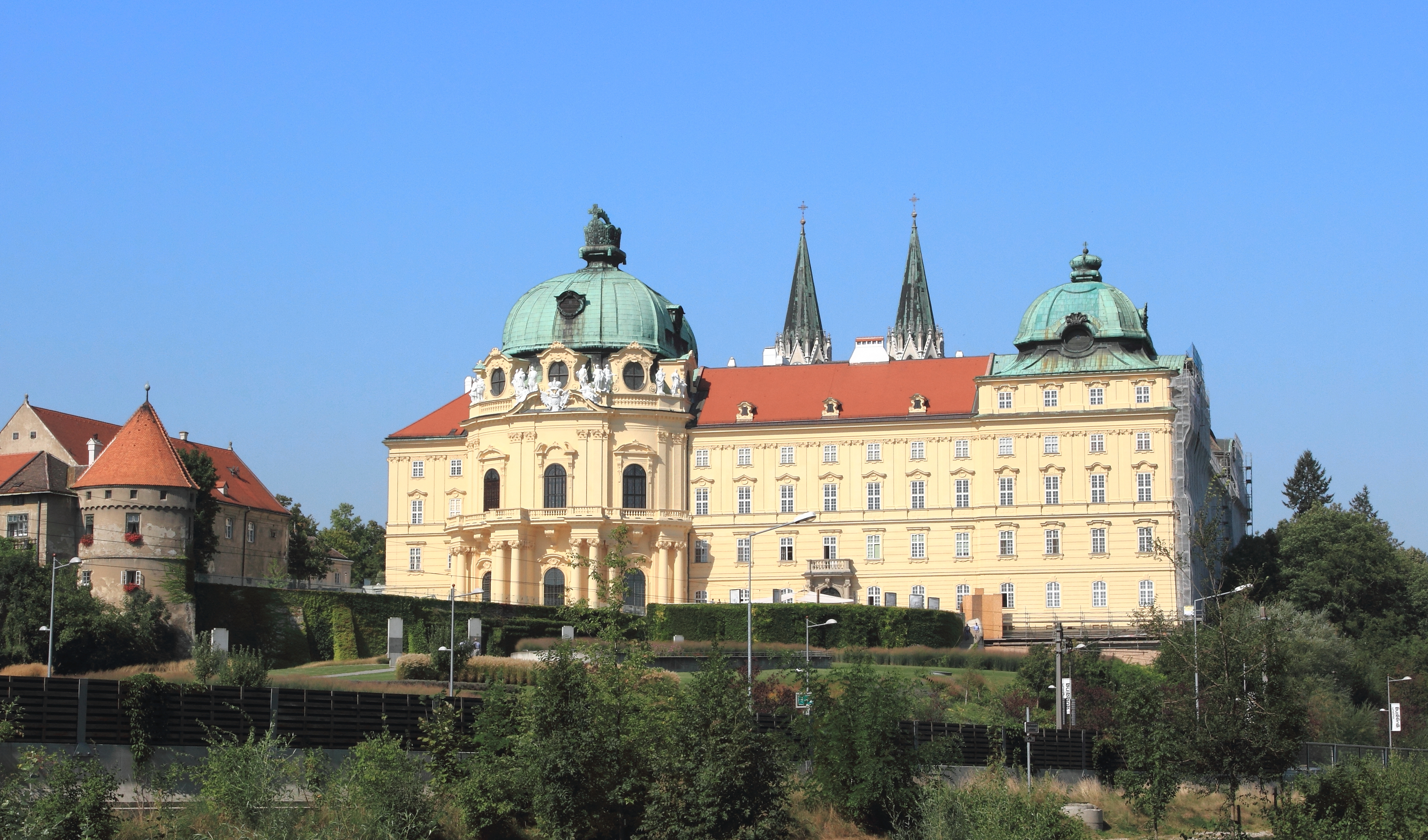
Exterior

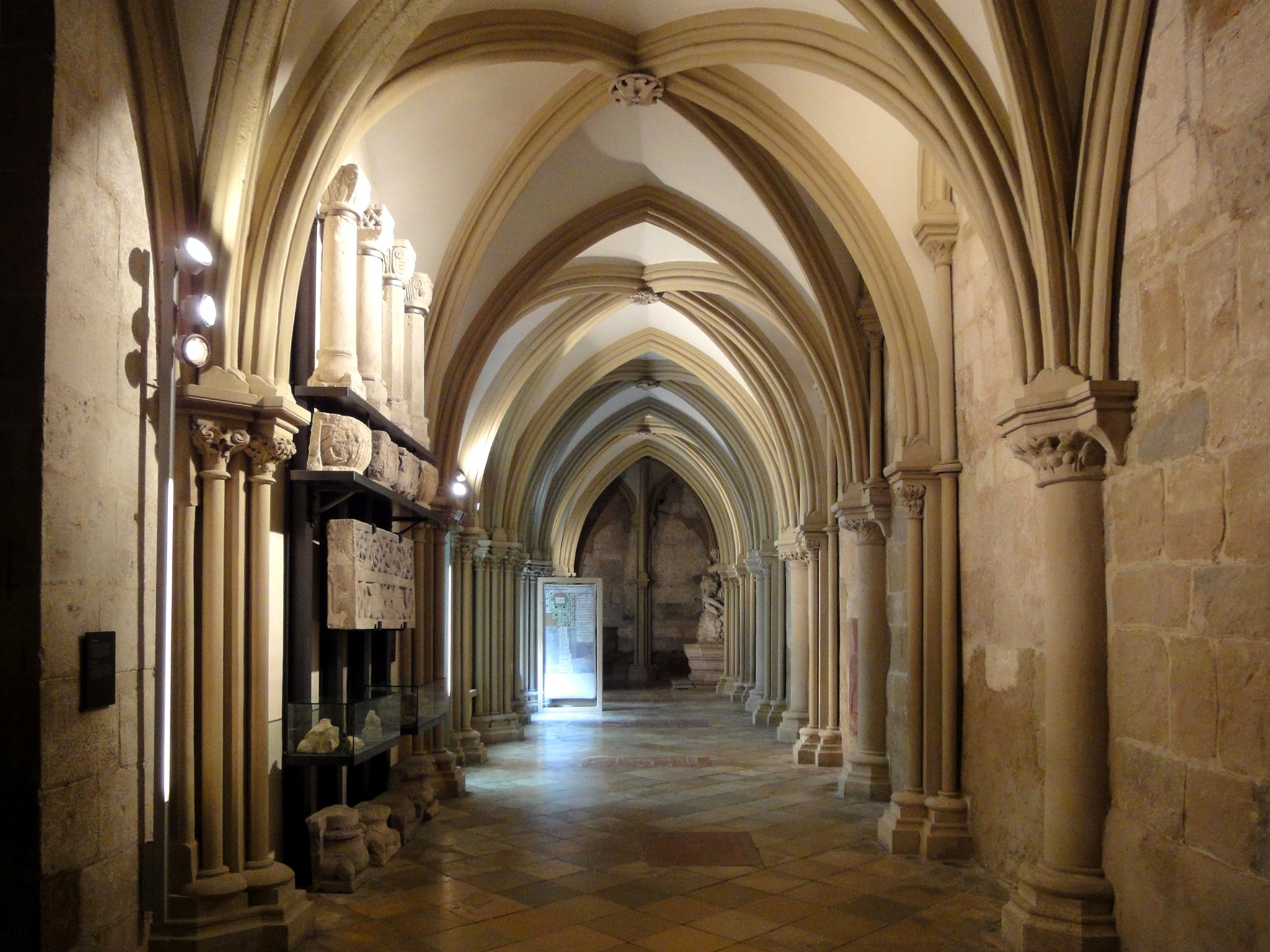
Church interior

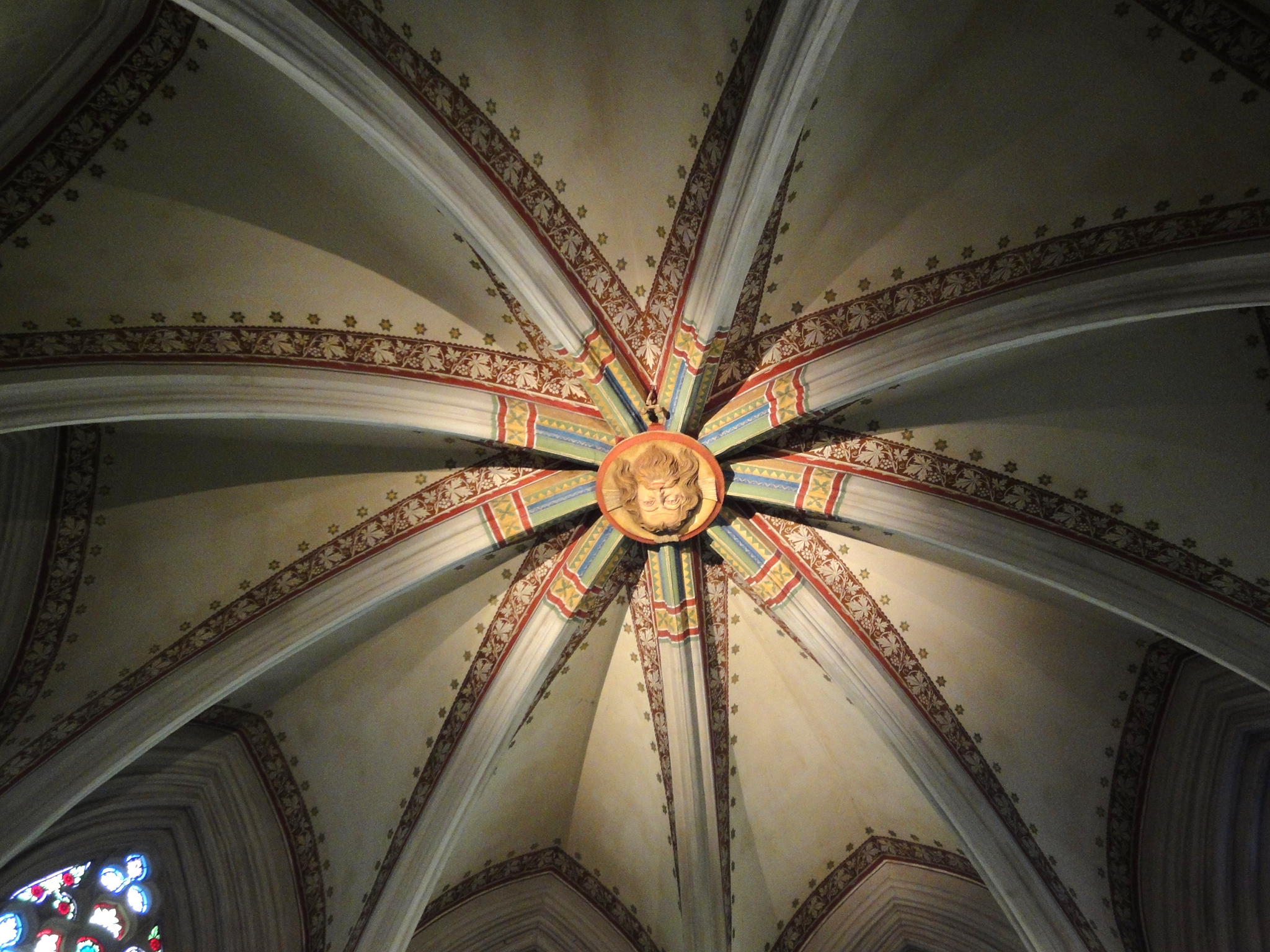
Inside of dome

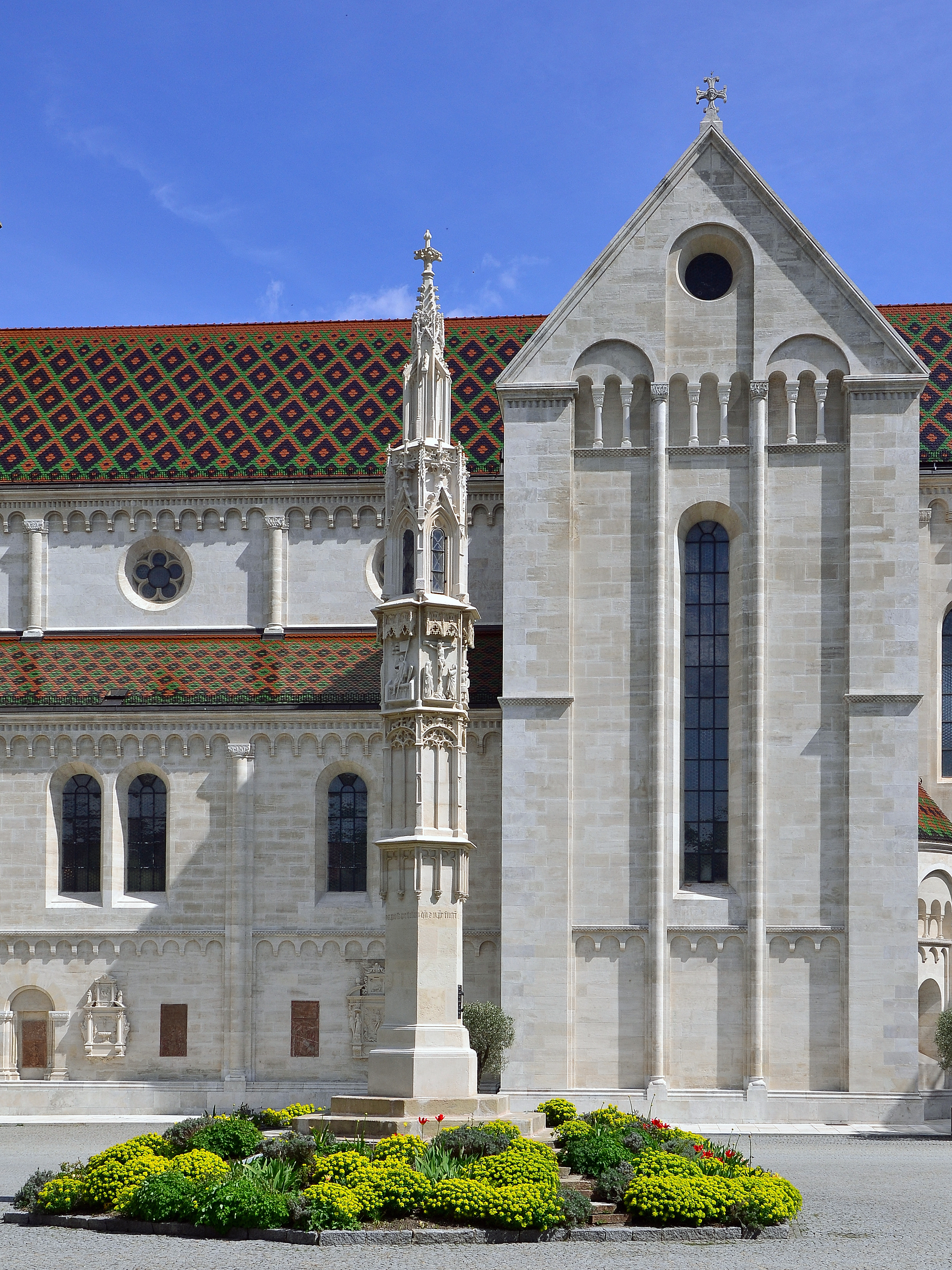
Lichtsäule

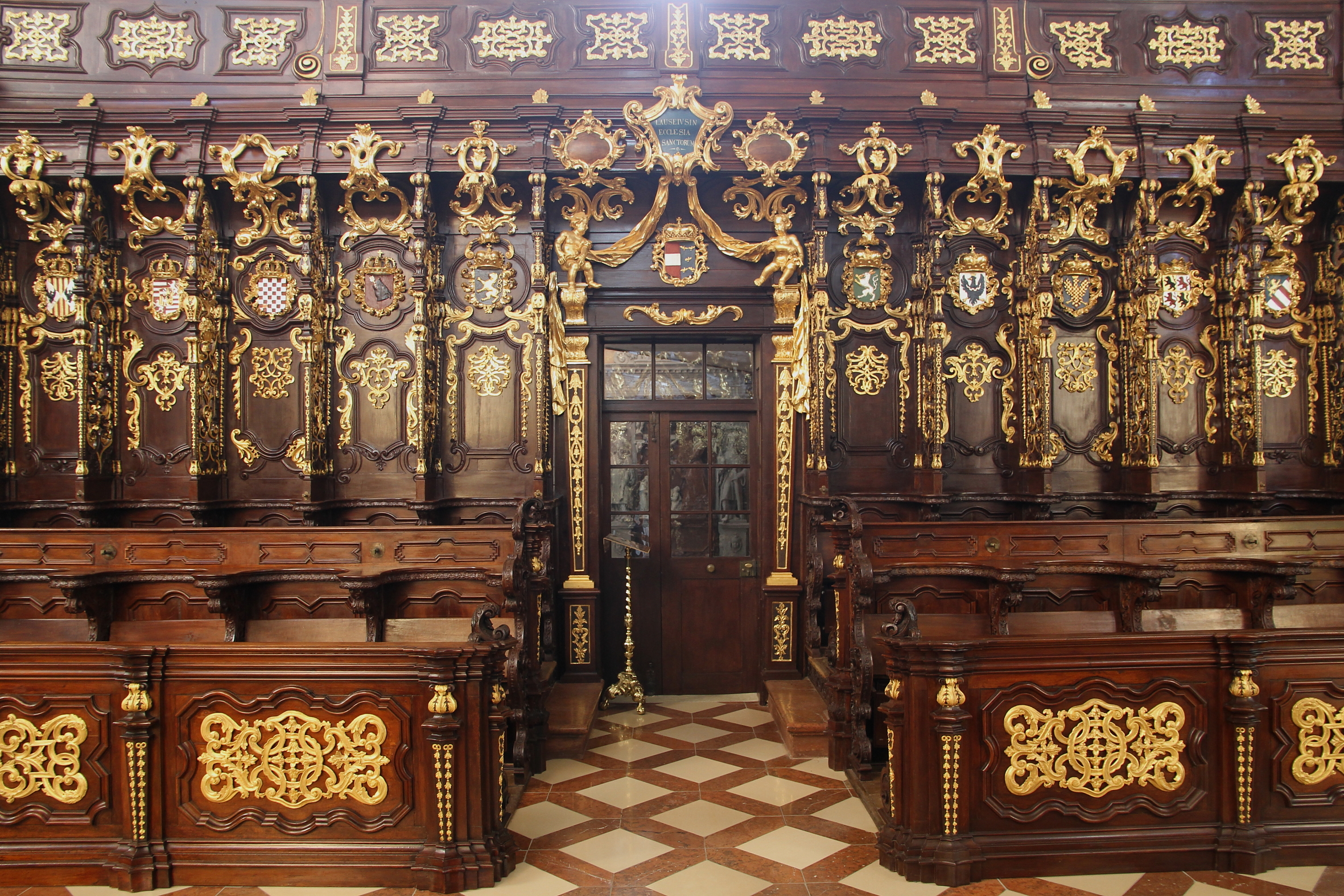
Choir stalls

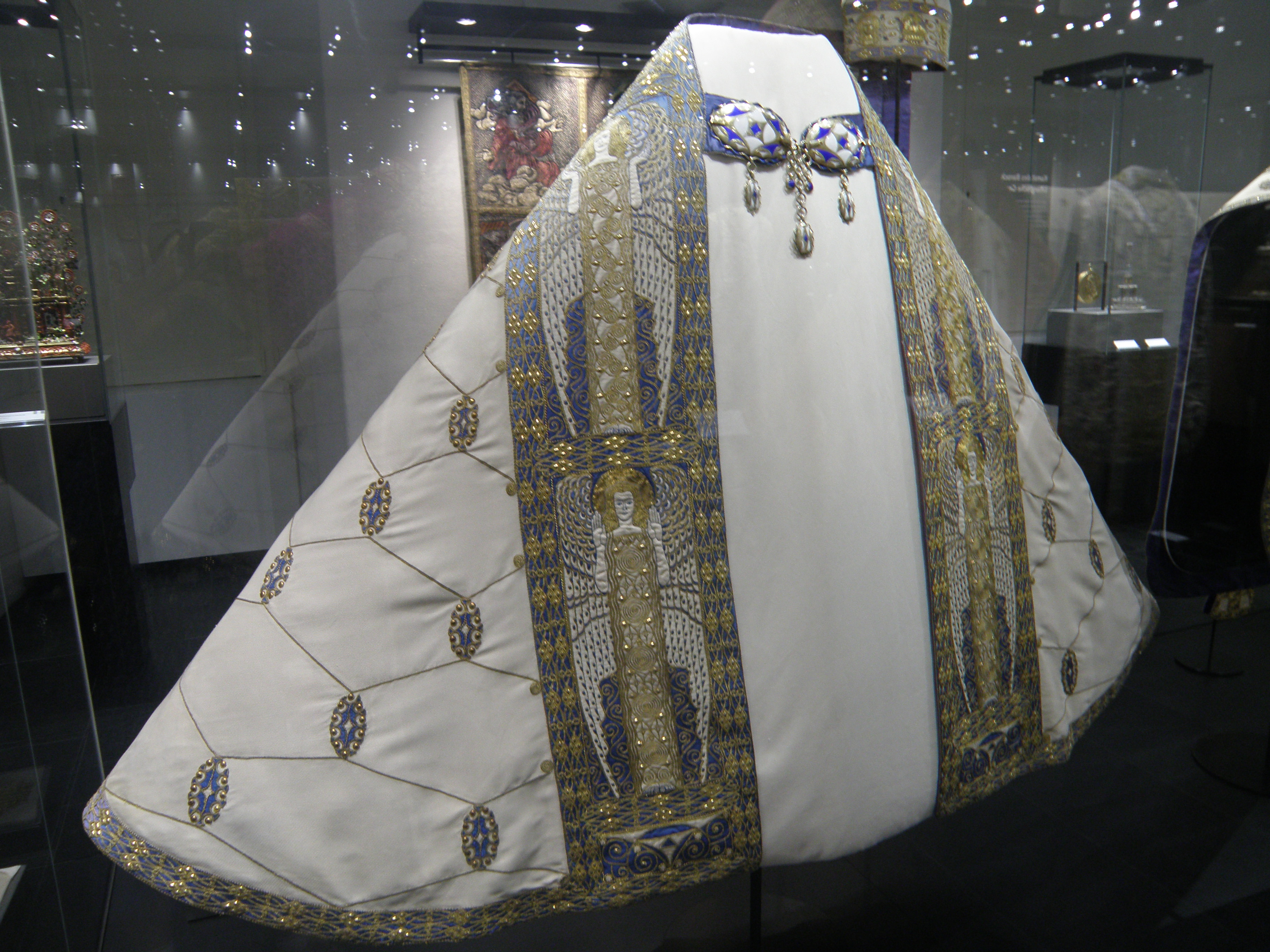
Monastery treasury

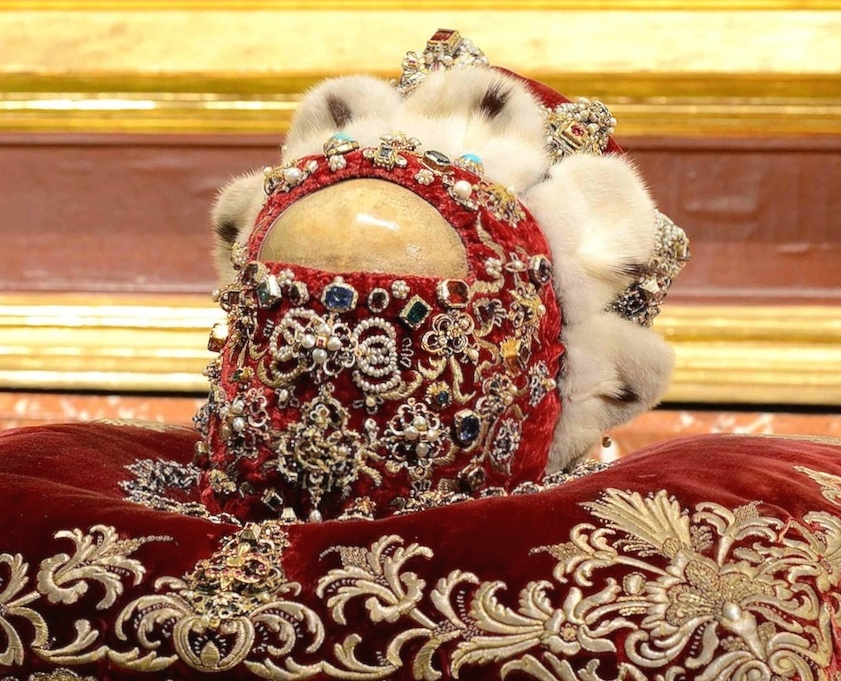
Skull relic of Saint Leopold, the founder of Klosterneuburg Abbey

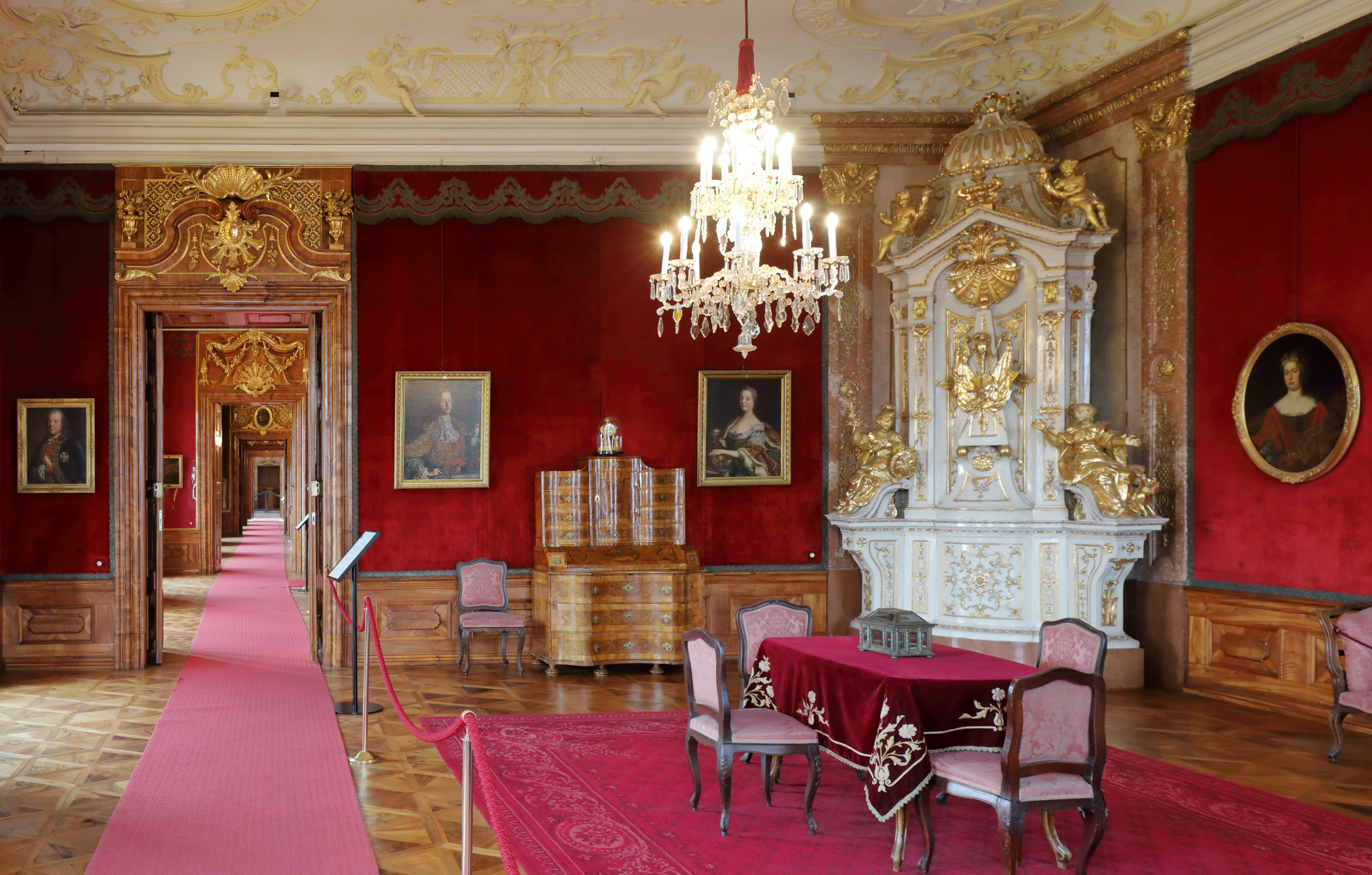
One of the imperial rooms

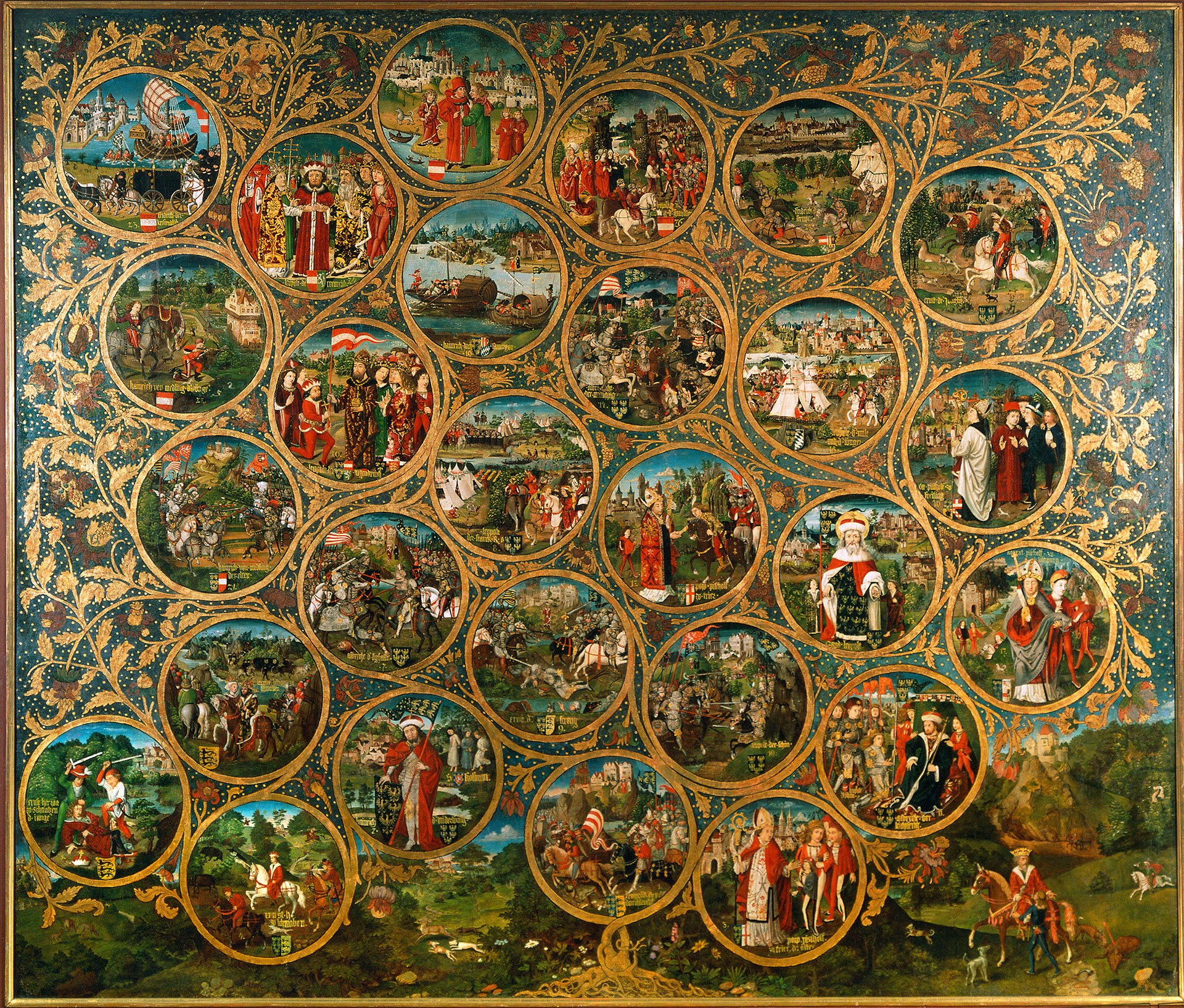
Babenberger Stammbaum, painting

== Game culture ==
As the core religious building of the former headquarters of Schicksal in Honkai Impact 3rd, the design prototype of St. 537 Church is none other than Klosterneuburg Abbey.
