= Nicholas of Verdun =

12th-century medieval goldsmith

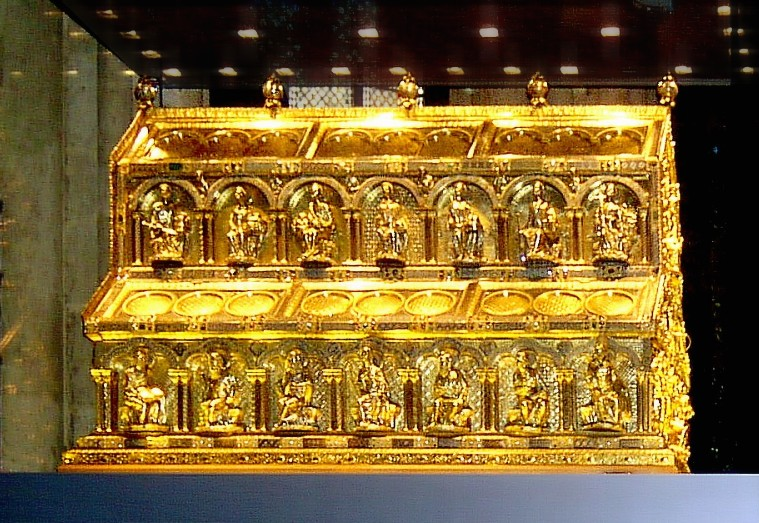
Shrine of the Three Kings at Cologne Cathedral

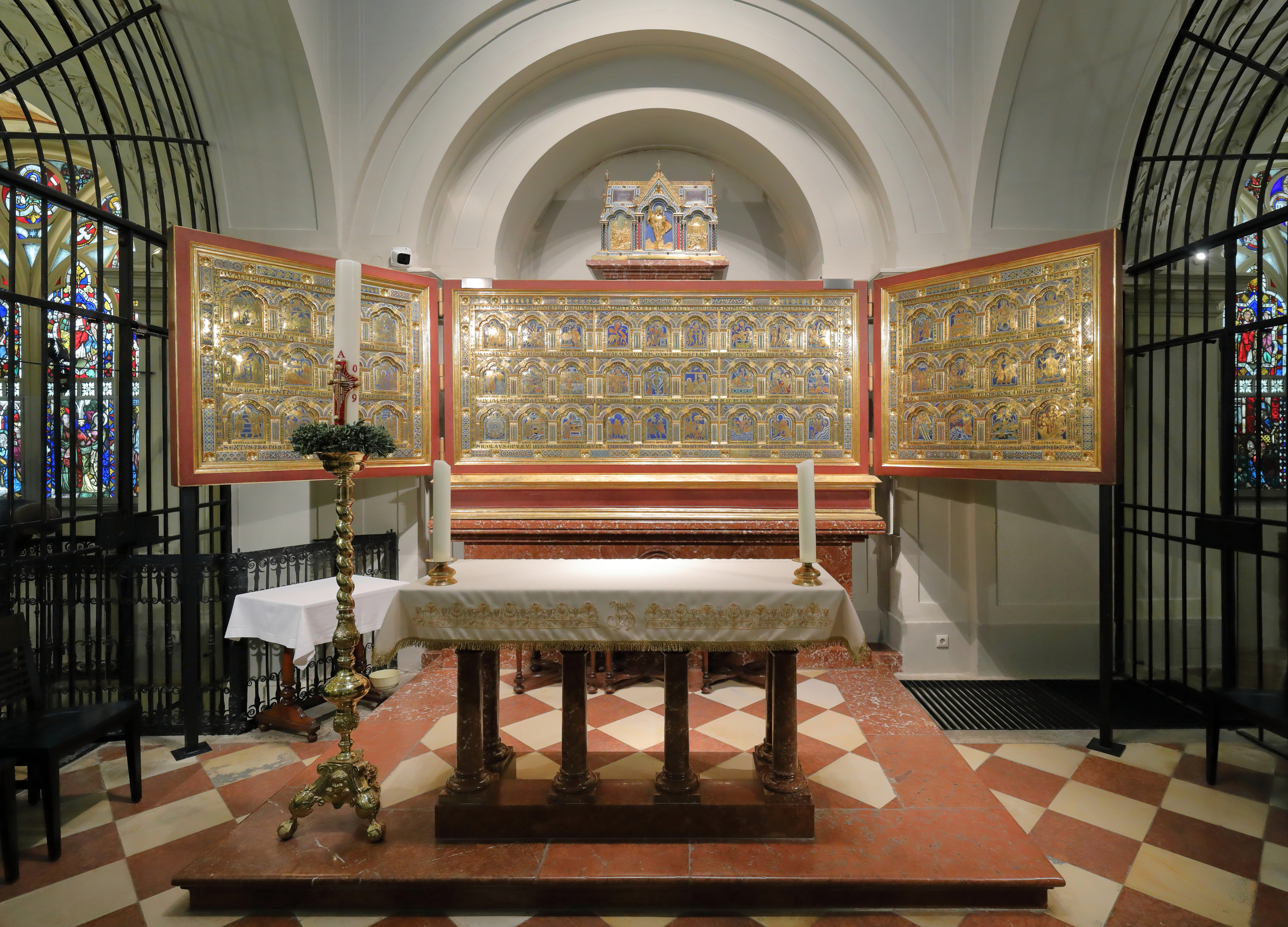
Verdun altarpiece at Klosterneuburg

Nicholas of Verdun (c. 1130 – c. 1205) was a renowned metalworker, goldsmith and enamellist active around the years 1180–1205. He was born in the city of Verdun, Upper Lorraine. The region extending from the valley of the Rhine and Meuse rivers to Cologne was the major northern center of copperplate enameled metalwork in the 12th century and Nicholas was probably trained in one of the many Mosan workshops. Although he must have maintained a large atelier of his own with numerous assistants, possibly based in Verdun, commissions in Cologne, northern France and outside Vienna required him to travel frequently.

Around the year 1200, a new awareness in northern Europe of Byzantine art, coinciding with a revival of interest in classical art, led to the emergence of a highly classicizing style of figural representation in stone sculpture, metalwork and manuscript illumination. Nicholas of Verdun was a leading practitioner of this short-lived proto-Renaissance as seen in the enameled plaques of the Klosterneuburg Altar and the Three Kings Shrine in Cologne Cathedral.

== Historical background ==
In the mid-12th century, casting surpassed hammering as the principal technique for modeling in metal. The process of bronze casting outlined by Theophilus around 1100 gives a clear sense of the kind of work Nicholas performed. Casting allowed for greater freedom of movement and gesture of figures.

== His work ==
The work of Nicholas saw the transition from late Romanesque to early Gothic styles such as the enameled altarpiece which was created for Klosterneuburg Monastery around 1180. His work also applied the technique of champlevé enameling. During his career he spent most of his time traveling to different locations where he was commissioned to develop most of his work. His work shows the understanding of conventions on utilizing the physicality of classical draperies which oblique the figures, resembling Byzantine art. He was an innovator and a master metalworker. Records indicate that most of his work ranges from figurines, to decorated candles with precious stones and shrines.

Nicholas of Verdun is known today because he signed his work in stone, as "NICOLAUS VIRDUNENSIS" and established the tradition of artists signing their work.

=== The Verdun Altar ===
The Verdun Altar is located at the Klosterneuburg Monastery in Austria. It was made in c.1181 and it is named after Nicholas of Verdun. Its composition contains detailed decorative panels which depict biblical scenes. The work is divided into 3 compartments that are comprised out of 45 copper squares. It is also split into 3 rows due to biblical reference and we have the central theme being the life of Jesus while the adjacent sides illustrate the life of Adam and Noah or David and the Babylonian captivity. The Medium used for this work is called champlevé enamel work where a metal base with compartments is filled with enamel. The program is set up according to biblical scenes and is considered to be the most important surviving work done with ambitious effort for something that was made in the 12th century. There is a transition of early Romanesque to a more classical handling according to the way the work was treated.

=== The Shrine of the Three Kings ===
This powerful and expressive work is located in the Treasury of the Cologne Cathedral. It is considered to be the largest reliquary created in the thirteenth century. It is alleged to hold the bones of the Biblical Magi. The shrine's general concept and figures of prophets were created by Nicholas of Verdun but much of the work was also done by his assistants. The shrine is said to hold the most important gilded metal figures of the 12th century. They contrast with the late Romanesque style due to the relatively naturalistic representation of figures and drapery. This artistic treatment inspired later works in sculpture and painting. The shrine was considered to be so marvelous that Cologne cathedral rebuilt its structure in 1248 in order to provide a more grand setting for the shrine. This piece is quite ornamental and it is made with gold and silver that is overlaid over a wooden basilica structure. It is 110 cm wide and 153 cm long. The panels contain over a thousand jewells and beads ranging from semi-precious to precious stones. There are a number of scenes that range from dawning of time to the last judgment. Throughout its history it was said that the shrine was hidden in 1794 from the French troops and at that time the work was shortened by one axis, which later ended up undergoing restoration which was done from 1961 to 1973. Today it stands in a medieval high altar of a Gothic cathedral particularly built for the presence of this shrine.

=== The Relic Shrine ===
According to the legends of Trabel, the Relic Shrine of Our Lady is from the 13th century. It can be seen in the city of Tournai where it is part of the art treasure in the Our Lady’s Cathedral of Waloon located in Belgium. Our Lady represents the origin of a patron saint. Her significance became important after 1090. Her Relics were carried around by Bishop Radbound in order to stop a deadly plague epidemic, and shortly after Tournai was saved. After this an annual procession became a customary ritual. A hundred years later Bishop Stefanus ordered a new shrine to be made in which an inscribed signature of the artist, Nicholas of Verdun was inscribed. Records indicate that the shrine was made in the early 1200s, and it resembles a more Gothic oriented approach where the artist combined enamel work with beaten metalwork. The Gothic reference in the work is seen through the expressive nature of the facial features or postures or the way the work was handled. The roof of the shrine predicts a program through a series of images which convey the life of Jesus and the life of the Virgin Mary. Images of prophets and angels are located above the arcade along with some of the scenes depicted are from: The Visitation, The flight of Egypt, The Visit of Mary to her cousin Elizabeth, the birth of Christ, the adoration of Magi, the baptism of Christ, the flagellation of Christ and so on. The original relics disappeared in 1566 during the Iconoclasm but the shrine remains in a restored condition after 1890 due to the aftermath of the French revolution.

=== Tri-lobed arch ===
Nicholas of Verdun created the tri-lobed arch in ca.1200, located in a reliquary shrine in Cologne, Germany. He used the technique of champlevé enamel on gilded copper to compose the work. Dimensions of the work are 11.4 cm by 27.9 cm and this was considered a gift of George Blumenthal in 1941.

=== Two Bronzes ===
As H.P. Mitchell noted in “Two Bronzes by Nicholas of Verdun”, the statues are actually a group of four seated figures. Of the four figures only two have been attributed to Nicholas of Verdun. Hence the name two bronzes and the figures are of Moses and the prophet. They were created in the 12th century while the other two, which are of Noah and David, were created in the 14th. This medieval work has a pronounced character. The seated figures are each holding an emblem which serves the purpose of identifying the characters in the following order. Moses is holding the table of laws, while the prophet holds his scroll case. The other two figures are of Noah who is holding a model of the ark while David seems to be holding nothing due to the disappearance of the harp, yet he can still be identified by his character. Figures are well rendered but the lower part of the seat in each figure seems to be incomplete. Moses and the prophet are seated in antique chairs that have an “X” form. The prophet’s scroll held a quotation, which has been lost.

== Bibliography ==
- Bernard S. Myers & Trewin Copplestone. 1985. Gothic Art: The History of Art: Architecture, Painting, Sculpture: England: Viscount Books
- Bernard S. Myers & Trewin Copplestone. 1985. The Saint Chapelle: The History of Art: Architecture, Painting, Sculpture: England: Viscount Books
- Michael Camille. 1996. New Visions of Time: Gothic Art-Glorious Visions: New Jersey: Prentice Hall
- Mitchell. H.P. "Two Bronzes by Nicholas of Verdun", the Burlington Magazine for Connoisseurs. Vol 38, NO217, April 1921
- Terrier Aliferis. L. 2016. L'imitation de l'Antiquité dans l'art médiéval, 1180–1230, Brepols (Terrier Aliferis 2016)
- Terrier Aliferis. L. 2020. Questions de mobilités au début de la période gothique, Brepols (Terrier Aliferis 2020)
- Tournai. 1996. Turnai: Our Lady’s Shrine (N. Verdun)
