= Lithium aluminate =

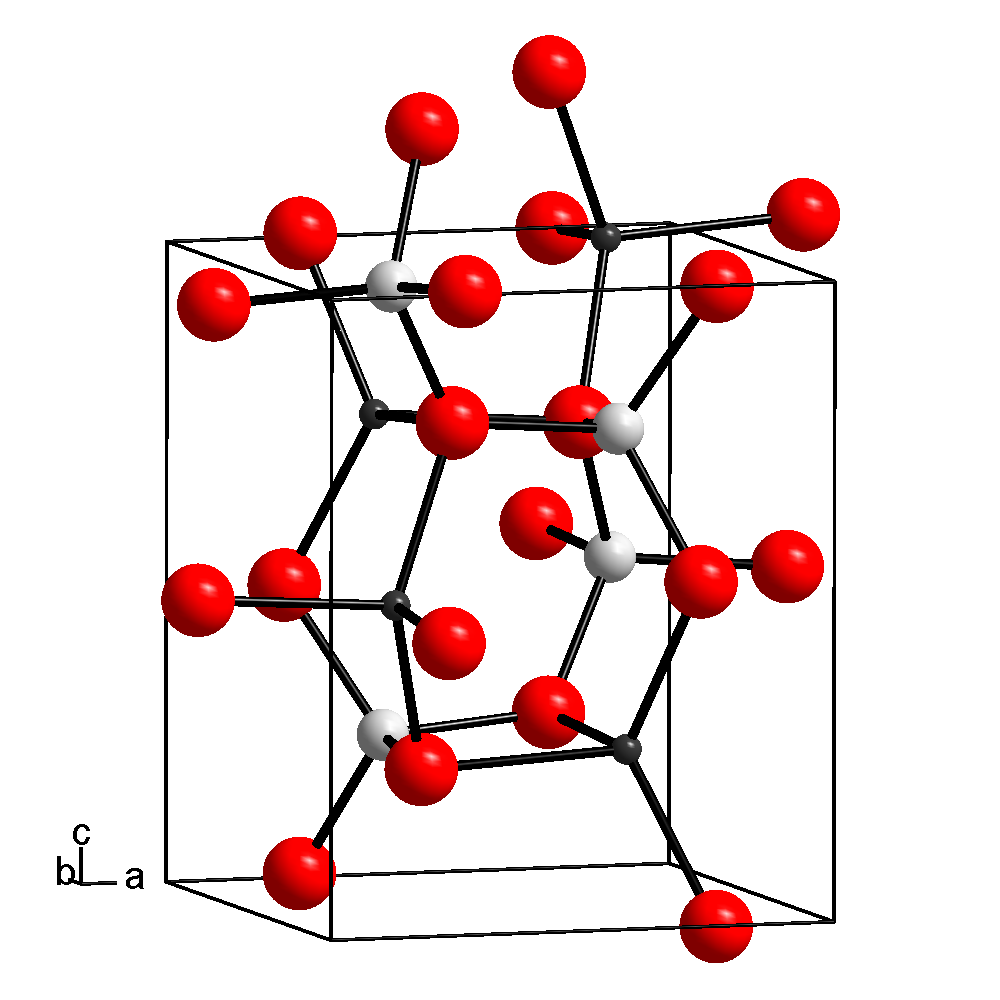
- __ Li^{+} __ Al^{3+} __ O^{2−}

Names
- Preferred IUPAC name Lithium aluminate
- Systematic IUPAC name Lithium(1+) aluminate
- Other names Lithium metaaluminate Lithium aluminum oxide Lithium aluminium double hydroxyde

Identifiers
CAS Number	12003-67-7
3D model (JSmol)	Interactive image
ChemSpider	109880
ECHA InfoCard	100.031.291
EC Number	234-434-9
MeSH	Lithium+aluminate
PubChem CID	123268
CompTox Dashboard (EPA)	DTXSID40893150
- InChI: InChI=1S/Al.Li.2O/q;+1;;-1 Key: YQNQTEBHHUSESQ-UHFFFAOYSA-N; InChI=1/Al.Li.2O/q;+1;;-1/rAlO2.Li/c2-1-3;/q-1;+1 Key: YQNQTEBHHUSESQ-YICCBGQXAE
- SMILES: [Li+].[O-][Al]=O

Properties
Chemical formula	AlLiO_{2}
Molar mass	65.92 g·mol^{−1}
Appearance	white crystalline powder
Density	2.615 g/cm^{3}, solid
Melting point	1,625 °C (2,957 °F; 1,898 K)
Solubility in water	insoluble

Thermochemistry
Std molar entropy (S^{⦵}_{298})	53.35 J/mol·K
Std enthalpy of formation (Δ_{f}H^{⦵}_{298})	−1188.670 kJ/mol
Gibbs free energy (Δ_{f}G^{⦵})	−1126.276 kJ/mol

Hazards
Safety data sheet (SDS)	External MSDS
- Except where otherwise noted, data are given for materials in their standard state (at 25 °C [77 °F], 100 kPa). verify (what is ?) Infobox references

Lithium aluminate (LiAlO_{2}), also called lithium aluminium oxide, is an inorganic chemical compound, an aluminate of lithium. In microelectronics, lithium aluminate is considered as a lattice matching substrate for gallium nitride. In nuclear technology, lithium aluminate is of interest as a solid tritium breeder material, for preparing tritium fuel for nuclear fusion. Lithium aluminate is a layered double hydroxide (LDH) with a crystal structure resembling that of hydrotalcite. Lithium aluminate solubility at high pH (12.5 – 13.5) is much lower than that of aluminium oxides. In the conditioning of low- and intermediate level radioactive waste (LILW), lithium nitrate is sometimes used as additive to cement to minimise aluminium corrosion at high pH and subsequent hydrogen production. Indeed, upon addition of lithium nitrate to cement, a passive layer of LiH(AlO_{2})_{2} · 5 H_{2}O is formed onto the surface of metallic aluminium waste immobilised in mortar. The lithium aluminate layer is insoluble in cement pore water and protects the underlying aluminium oxide covering the metallic aluminium from dissolution at high pH. It is also a pore filler. This hinders the aluminium oxidation by the protons of water and reduces the hydrogen evolution rate by a factor of 10.

Lithium aluminate also finds its use as an inert electrolyte support material in molten carbonate fuel cells, where the electrolyte may be a mixture of lithium carbonate, potassium carbonate, and sodium carbonate.

== History ==
In 1906 Weyberg described his newly synthesized compound, lithium hydrogen aluminate. This was the first known synthesis of this unique compound. He asserted that this new compound had the corresponding chemical formula:

LiHAl_{2}O_{4} + 5 H_{2}O

In 1915 Allen and Rogers asserted that an insoluble aluminate of lithium is formed when aluminum is dissolved in a solution of lithium hydroxide. This air-dried substance had an atomic ratio of 2Li:5Al and the chemical formula:

LiH(AlO_{2})_{2} + 5 H_{2}O

In 1929 Prociv recreated Allen and Rogers experiment and through a series of conductometric measurements on the saturated solution of the substance concluded that lithium and aluminum were present in the ratio of 0.8Li:2Al, which, he says, is an atomic ratio of approximately 1Li:2Al. According to him lithium aluminate may also be precipitated by the addition of a solution of lithium hydroxide to a solution of aluminum salt or by adding a solution of lithium salt to a solution of an alkali aluminate. Thus there was disagreement between Allen/Rogers and Prociv as to the composition of lithium aluminate. This may have been attributed to variations between their precipitation conditions.

In 1932 Dobbins and Sanders described the formation of lithium aluminate by the addition of dilute ammonia to a solution containing lithium and aluminum salt, in the presence of phenolphthalein as an indicator. In their preparation of acid lithium aluminate they dissolved strips of amalgamated aluminum in normal and tenth normal solutions of lithium hydroxide. The lithium aluminate was precipitated by the addition of a solution of lithium hydroxide to a solution of aluminum salts, or by adding a solution of lithium salt to a solution of alkaline aluminate. In all cases the composition of the compound of lithium aluminate was expressed by the formula:

Li_{2}O_{2}Al_{2}O_{2}

They claimed that the formed compound contained lithium and aluminum in the atomic ratio of 2Li:5Al. Their chemical formula was simplified into the modern formulation for lithium aluminate:

LiAlO_{2}

== Fields of interest ==
The fundamental compound of lithium aluminate has found attention in two different fields: nuclear physics and solid-state chemistry. At least five different phases of lithium aluminate have been found. The lithium aluminate crystal structure may be found in either α, β, or γ phases.

Nuclear physicists are interested in the γ-LiAlO_{2} modification of lithium aluminate, because of its good performance under high neutron and electron radiation. This modification also exhibits the essential chemical, thermo physical and mechanical stability at high temperature along with the required irradiation behavior. This phase appears to be a promising lithium ceramic, suitable as an in site tritium breeding material in future fusion reactors.

Solid-state chemists investigating preparational routes to lithium aluminate discovered its interesting acid-base chemistry. The α-LiAlO_{2} modification (but neither β-LiAlO_{2} or γ-LiAlO_{2}) reacts with molten benzoic acid leading to nearly total Li^{+} proton exchange thus forming LiHAl_{2}O_{4} There is a lot of interest in the chemical reactivity among the three modifications of LiAlO_{2}. The reasons for the α-LiAlO_{2} modification being highly reactive and the β-LiAlO_{2} or γ-LiAlO_{2} modifications being totally unreactive is currently a mystery.

== Formation ==
=== Early methods ===
Lithium aluminate powder preparation was based on the solid-state reactions between Al_{2}O_{3} and lithium-containing compounds like Li_{2}CO_{3}, LiOH, Li_{2}O, LiAc, and reactions occurred at temperatures between 400Deg C to 1000 Deg C. Due to the evaporation of lithium at high temperatures and contamination from grinding operations, pure lithium aluminate with controlled particle size has been difficult to synthesize.

=== Current methods ===
Synthesis of lithium aluminate has been essentially performed by several methods: in the solid state, by wet chemical, sol-gel, with the use of templates, various precursors, and combustion processes. The main product in a solid state reaction is the α-LiAlO_{2} phase; in a wet chemical reaction, the main product is a solid solution of α-LiAlO_{2} and γ-LiAlO_{2} phases. The α-LiAlO_{2} modification (low temperature phase), with a hexagonal structure, undergoes transformation to the γ-modification (High temperature phase), with a tetragonal structure, at about 900 °C. The metastable β-modification, with a monoclinic structure, is assumed to transform to the γ-modification at about 900 °C.

== Natural occurrence ==
The compound is unknown in the natural environment. However, a related compound, LiAl_{5}O_{8}, is known as the very recently discovered (as of 2020) and very rare mineral chukochenite.
