= Alessia di Matteo =

Italian organ transplant recipient (2003–2005)

- Born: July 4, 2003; Genoa, Italy
- Died: January 12, 2005 (aged 1); Genoa, Italy

Alessia di Matteo (July 4, 2003 – January 12, 2005) was an Italian from Genoa. Di Matteo became the first person in history to survive the transplantion of eight organs in a single operation, although she died a year later of complications. She was operated on at the age of six months on January 31, 2004, in Miami. She was born with megacystis microcolon intestinal hypoperistalsis (MMIH) syndrome (also known as Berdon syndrome), a congenital smooth muscle disorder which affected her kidneys, intestines and stomach; she would have died earlier without treatment. She received a liver, a small and large intestine, a pancreas, a new stomach, a spleen and two kidneys. The operation was led by doctor Andreas Tzakis.

Di Matteo remained in Florida until one month before her death, so that doctors could watch for complications. Complications did develop, and eventually caused her death in a Genoan hospital at the age of 18 months.
