= Donato Felice d'Allio =

Austrian architect (1677–1761)

Donato Felice d'Allio (October 24, 1677 – May 6, 1761) was an Italian architect of the Baroque who worked in Austria.

He was commissioned by Charles VI to redesign the Klosterneuburg Monastery, but the work was never finished. Donato Felice d'Allio began an apprenticeship as a mason in his native country around 1690. Around 1698, he arrived in Vienna as a journeyman, where he later worked as a foreman and eventually became a master mason. From 1711 to 1747, he was employed by the Military Construction Office, where he prepared reports and expert opinions, for example, on the military permissibility of civilian buildings.

He was born at Scaria, near Como, and died at Vienna.
