= Matteo di Guaro Allio =

- Born: 1605; Scaria, Lombardy
- Died: 1670 (aged 64–65)
- Known for: Sculptor
- Style: Baroque

Matteo di Guaro Allio (1605–1670) was an Italian sculptor of the Baroque period, active mainly in Padua. Born in Scaria, in Lombardy, Italy, he produced some of the sculpture for the lateral pilasters of the Capella dell'arca of the Basilica of Saint Anthony of Padua. He worked there alongside Girolamo Pironi. Matteo was the brother of Tommaso Allio, also sculptor and architect in Padua.

== Sources ==
- Ticozzi, Stefano (1830). Dizionario degli architetti, scultori, pittori, intagliatori in rame ed in pietra, coniatori di medaglie, musaicisti, niellatori, intarsiatori d'ogni etá e d'ogni nazione' (Volume 1). Milan: Gaetano Schiepatti. p. 43.
- Getty ULAN entry.
