= Byzantine Empire under the Angelos dynasty =

Period of Byzantine history from 1185 to 1204

Byzantine Empire: Βασιλεία Ῥωμαίων (Ancient Greek); Imperium Romanum (Latin)
- 1185–1204
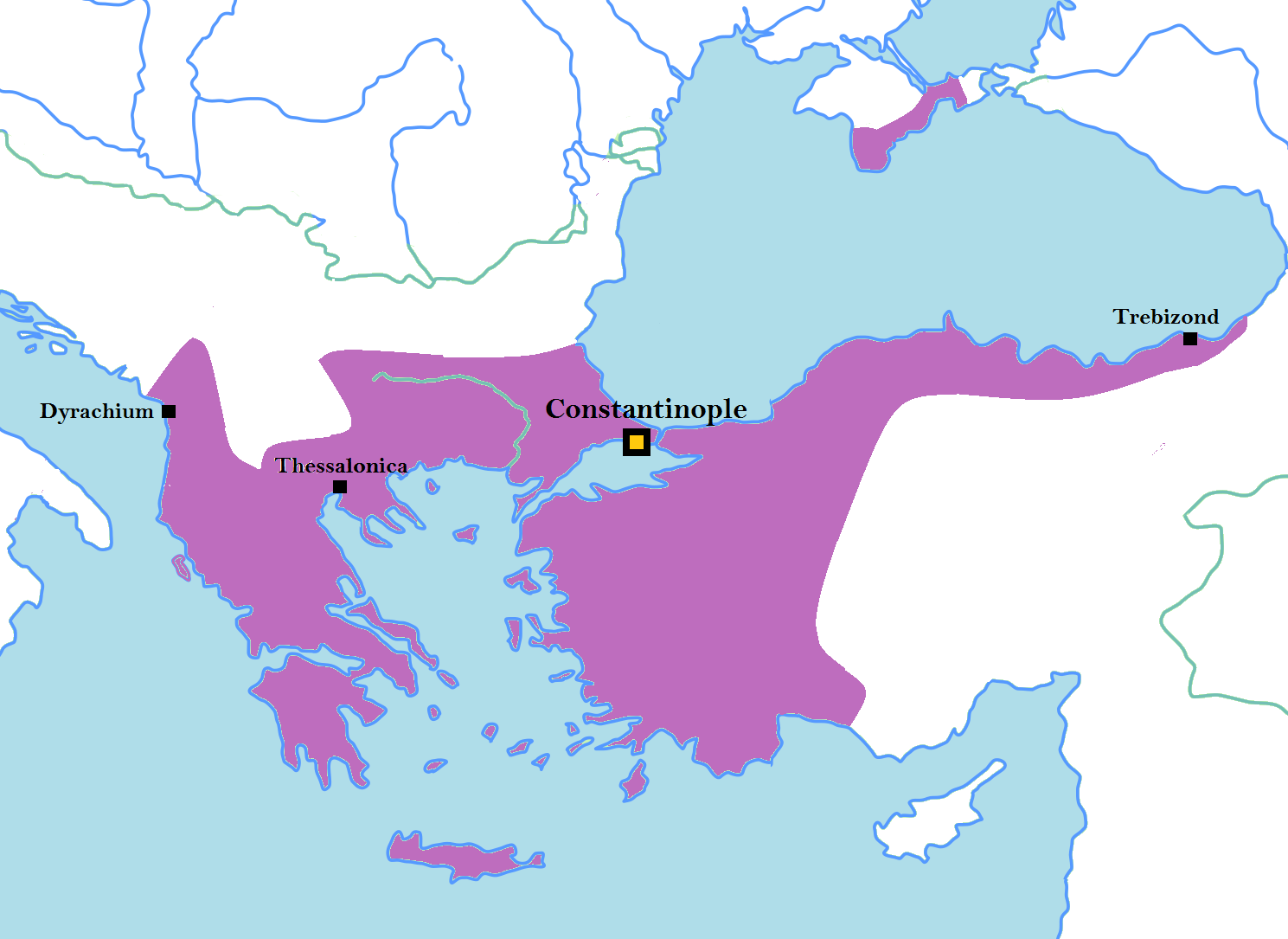
- The Byzantine Empire in 1203 AD.
- Capital: Constantinople
- Common languages: Greek, Old Albanian, Armenian, Aromanian, Old Bulgarian, Old Anatolian Turkish and other South Slavic languages
- Religion: Greek Orthodox Church
- Government: Monarchy
- Emperor
  - 1185–1195; 1203–1204: Isaac II Angelos
  - 1195–1203: Alexios III
  - 1203–1204: Alexios IV
  - 1204: Alexios V
- History
  - Deposition of Andronikos I: 1185
  - Sack of Constantinople by the Fourth Crusade: 1204
Preceded by
Byzantine Empire under the Komnenos dynasty
Succeeded by
Latin Empire
Empire of Nicaea
Empire of Trebizond
Despotate of Epirus
Kingdom of Thessalonica
Sultanate of Rum
Principality of Arbanon

The Byzantine Empire was ruled by emperors of the Angelos dynasty between 1185 and 1204 AD. The Angeloi rose to the throne following the deposition of Andronikos I Komnenos, the last male-line Komnenos to rise to the throne. The Angeloi were female-line descendants of the previous dynasty. While in power, the Angeloi were unable to stop the invasions of the Turks by the Sultanate of Rum, the uprising and resurrection of the Bulgarian Empire, and the loss of the Dalmatian coast and much of the Balkan areas won by Manuel I Komnenos to the Kingdom of Hungary.

Infighting among the elite saw Byzantium lose substantial financial capability and military power. The previous policies of openness with Western Europe, followed by the sudden massacre of Latins under Andronikos, had preceded the rule of the Angeloi making enemies among Western European states. The weakening of the empire under the Angeloi dynasty resulted in the partitioning of the Byzantine Empire when in 1204, soldiers of the Fourth Crusade overthrew the last Angeloi Emperor, Alexios V Doukas.

== Background ==
=== Alexios II Komnenos ===
When Manuel I Komnenos died on 24 September 1180, his son and successor was the 11-year-old Alexios II Komnenos. He passed "his entire life at play or the chase, and contracted several habits of pronounced viciousness." Consequently, this child, unfit to rule both physically and mentally ruled with a regency led by his mother, Maria of Antioch. Her Frankish connections guaranteed her the hatred of the Byzantine Empire; the Principality of Antioch was at the time one of the most rebellious vassals of Byzantium.

Latin hatred had grown throughout the Empire and the capital mainly due to the jealousy of Byzantine merchants at the pro-western policies of Manuel Komnenos and his paternal grandfather, Alexios I Komnenos, whose generous trade terms with the Republic of Venice saw the establishment of a Frankish colony in the capital. Maria then decided to appoint an unpopular pro-western Byzantine also named Alexios Komnenos, a nephew of Manuel Komnenos, to be her chief advisor in the regency. It is said that he, "was accustomed to spending the greater part of the day in bed ... whenever the sun appeared, he would seek the darkness, like a wild beast; he took much pleasure in rubbing his decaying teeth, putting new ones in the place of those that had fallen out through old age."

=== Andronikos I Komnenos ===
The instability of Alexios' regency led to much corruption throughout the Empire. Subsequently Andronikos Komnenos, a grandson of Alexios I, decided to promptly launch yet another rebellion against the Emperor. Andronikos was over 6 feet (1.8 m) tall; his flattering charms were said to have stolen the hearts of a number of noblewomen and with it earned the anger of their menfolk. Exiled by Manuel Komnenos, he returned in 1180 following his death. Despite his senior age of 64 years in 1182, Andronikos is depicted as retaining the good looks of his forties. In August of that year Andronikos sparked a rebellion by marching on the Capital. The army and the navy swiftly joined him and soon rebellion broke out in Constantinople in the name of Andronikos. A massacre of Latins then proceeded, with the women, children and even the sick in the hospitals of the Capital shown no mercy. The trading rights of the Venetians, granted by Alexios almost a century earlier, were also revoked. These actions made the empire powerful enemies in western Europe. The Emperor and his mother, Maria of Antioch, were sent to an Imperial Villa.

Maria Komnene, daughter of Manuel Komnenos by his first wife Bertha of Sulzbach, was poisoned along with her husband Renier of Montferrat. Next Alexios' mother, Maria of Antioch, was strangled in her cell. When Andronikos was finally crowned co-emperor in September 1183, he waited two months before disposing of Alexios II Komnenos. Afterwards, Andronikos took his 12-year-old wife Agnes of France for himself, consummating the marriage.

Early on, Andronikos ruled wisely – he began by attacking the corruption within the taxation and administration of the empire. Before long his heavy-handed ruling of the Empire gave rise to enemies in all corners of the Empire; the aristocrats in Anatolia were conspiring against his rule, Isaac Komnenos declared Cyprus an independent kingdom and Béla III of Hungary, formerly engaged to Maria Komnene, began sacking towns along Dalmatia and Croatia. However, these calamities were nothing in comparison to the storm that had lain dormant, that some would argue was worse than the Turks of Manzikert – the Normans of the Kingdom of Sicily.

Between late 1184 and early 1185, William II of Sicily assembled a host of 80,000 soldiers and sailors and some 200–300 ships to conquer the empire. Andronikos, despite his grand military reputation was paralysed by indecision. The garrison at Durazzo had no provisions for a siege and the defenders surrendered without resistance. The massive Norman army continued to march eastward, sacking towns without any attempts by the Byzantines to engage them. Eventually Thessalonika, the second city of the empire, was reached. The Normans knew the importance of the city – its harbour gave it control of the Aegean Sea and its easy sea access made it a jewel in the Mediterranean that rivalled even Constantinople. Nonetheless, the Byzantines did little to stop a brutal massacre, rape and desecration of the churches and buildings inside. One contemporary chronicler wrote: "These barbarians...carried their violence to the very foot of the altars. It was thought strange that they should wish to destroy our icons, using them as fuel for the fires on which they cooked. More criminal still, they would dance upon the altars before which the angels trembled, and sing profane songs. Then they would piss all over the church, flooding the floors with their urine."|

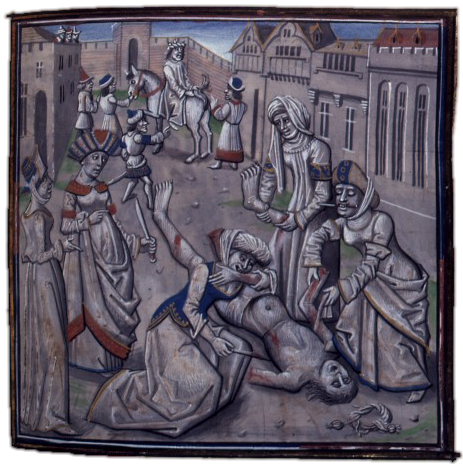
Andronikos is killed.

Later, the Norman army marched further inland to Mosynopolis, half-way to Constantinople. The population at the time was some 500,000 and any popular revolt would mean the end of Andronikos' unpopular regime. His efforts to contain the threat of "the barbarians" was twofold in nature – he assembled a force of 100 ships at the capital and brought in troops to strengthen the walls of Constantinople.

However, it would not be Andronikos who would fight the Normans but Isaac Angelos, a great-grandson of Alexios I, was foretold by a soothsayer that he would one day rule the empire. Andronikos could not bear such a prophecy and ordered his immediate arrest by courtier Stephen Hagiochristophorites. This backfired for Andronikos, with Isaac killing Stephen and arousing the citizens within the Hagia Sophia to rise in revolt. Prisons were opened and the prisoners joined the riot. Andronikos seems to have taken this lightly, as yet another tiresome rebellion to destroy – only when the palace guards refused to obey him did he realise the full extent of the danger. He planned to escape with his teen wife Agnes of France and his concubine Maraptike aboard a galley. He was caught before he could execute his escape – and suffered dearly for it: "They beat him, stoned him, goaded him with spikes, pelted him with filth. A woman of the streets poured boiling water on his head...Then dragging him from the camel, they hung him up by his feet. At last, after much agony, he died, carrying his remaining hand to his mouth; which he did in the opinion of some, that he might suck the blood that flowed from one of his wounds."

== Isaac II Angelos ==
Isaac's rule follows a similar pattern of that of his predecessor. He inherited a Byzantium in chaos and the Normans in the west, only 200 miles (320 km) from Constantinople did not disappear with the rebellion. Summoning up every soldier that could be spared in the vicinity, Isaac ordered Alexios Branas, his most able general, to drive back the Normans, who had lost all discipline and grown overconfident and fat in their anticipation of an easy victory at the capital. After a small but demoralizing defeat for the Normans, negotiations began. However, the Greeks were keen to finish off the enemy and another assault by Branas saw the Norman army destroyed.

In the absence of the main Byzantine army, the Bulgarians also revolted under Peter IV of Bulgaria. Their timing could not have been better, since Byzantium was still reeling from a bloody coup and a disastrous invasion. Isaac resolved to pacify the Bulgarian rebellion with force and headed a military expedition north. The Byzantine army was ambushed in a way reminiscent of the Battle of Manzikert and of the earlier fiasco at Pliska. The last attempt to enforce Byzantine authority over Bulgaria concurred with Isaac's last genuine attempts at running the Empire; according to scholars, from then on, Isaac's policies were rarely more than reactionary.

The recent anti-Latin resentment in the Empire led to the Crusader states losing their protection from Byzantium. However, whilst the Crusader states should not and did not rely on Byzantium for protection, the Byzantines certainly did in that it kept the aggressive expansionism of Islam in check. This could not be further from the truth in regards to the Principality of Antioch. With the fall of Jerusalem in 1187 to Saladin it was Western Europe that immediately posed a threat to the Empire. A new Crusade was declared by the recently elected Pope Gregory VIII.

Many answered the call and an army of some 200,000 in total participated – roughly 150,000 – 100,000 men were sent by the Holy Roman Empire alone, a natural rival of Byzantium to the Imperial claim. King Henry II of England died and did not fulfill his crusader vow. However, his son and successor Richard I of England took the vow and along with his rival, Philip II of France took to the sea to retake the Holy Land. All three of these Crusaders had some scores to settle with Byzantium – Richard was the brother-in-law of William II of Sicily through the marriage of the later with his sister Joan of England. He would prove to be just as adventurous as his kinsman. Philip had heard of the sufferings of his own sister, Agnes of France. None of these would compare with the danger posed by Frederick I, Holy Roman Emperor. Almost seventy years old, Frederick had fought in multiple battles and charged at reckless odds in the pursuit of victory. There was no doubt therefore that his massive army would smash their way to Jerusalem with ease, provided it was given the means to do so by the Byzantine Empire.

=== Third Crusade ===
The Third Crusade thus set out with the aims of driving back the "infidels" who had taken Jerusalem. Richard and Philip's sea route meant that they would not have to rely on their Greek counterparts for supplies or permission to pass through. The odd exception came when Richard crushed the rebellion of Isaac Komnenos and refused to hand the island of Cyprus back to Byzantium, using it instead to tame his rebellious vassal Guy of Lusignan, former King of Jerusalem. The new Kingdom of Cyprus would last from 1192 to 1489 before being annexed by the Republic of Venice.

The crusade under Frederick was a different matter. His army was too large for any Imperial fleet and took the land route through Anatolia. As he neared Byzantium, Stefan Nemanja of Serbia and the above-mentioned Peter IV of Bulgaria hastily concluded an anti-Byzantine alliance with the Holy Roman Emperor. Isaac decided to send his army to meet Frederick but the plan backfired when the army's commander initiated secret negotiations to overthrow Isaac.

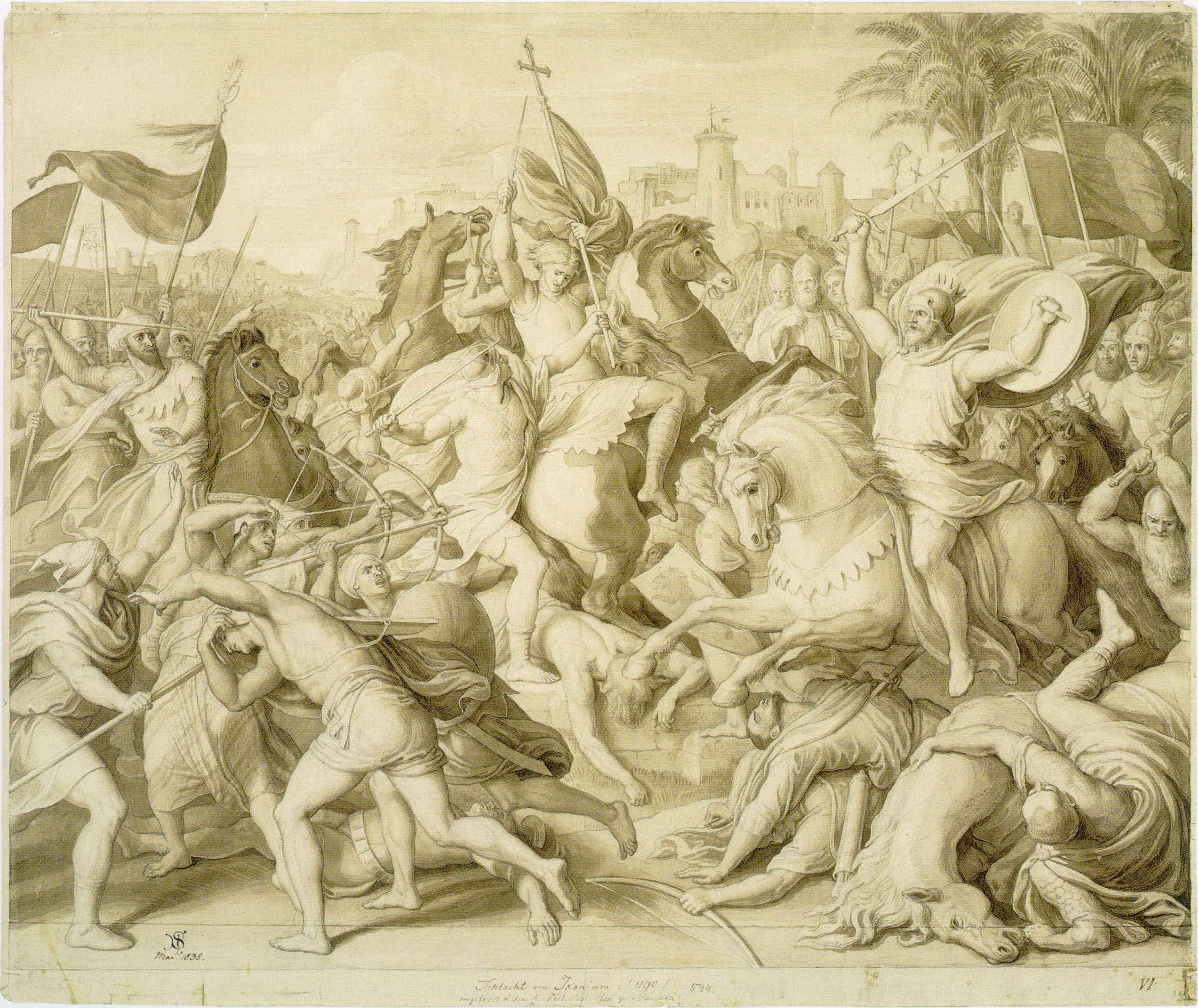
Iconium is won by the Third Crusade. This was Byzantium's second and last benefit of the Crusades.

Panicked by the sudden and overwhelming opponent army arriving, Isaac refused to offer Frederick support, imprisoning his envoys. Furious at this "Greek betrayal", Frederick ordered his son Henry, King of the Romans, who had remained in Germany to ask Pope Clement III permission to attack the Greek Christians. A western Imperial fleet was also mobilized for transport to cross in Asia whilst he prepared an assault on Constantinople. Realizing that he was damned either way, Isaac decided to allow the Crusaders to cross the Dardanelles, a crossing further from Constantinople than was the Bosporus and provided the transport required for such an immense task.

Isaac failed to take advantage of the chaos of the Crusaders army. As it marched across the Anatolian peninsula, it encountered frequent Turkish raids, despite official gestures of friendship from the Sultanate of Rûm under Kilij Arslan II. Not bearing to stand by and do nothing, Frederick sacked Iconium, capital of the Sultanate, before moving on. Isaac did not seize the initiative and Kilij Arslan II returned later to reclaim his fallen capital. Frederick's army would later slowly but surely disband after the Holy Roman Emperor was found dead (presumed to have either drowned in a river, suffered a heart attack or perhaps both). More looting and damage would be done by these weary soldiers as they retreated back to Europe.

Meanwhile, the Third Crusade achieved ephemeral success – after a few indecisive victories against Saladin, Richard was forced to depart for France where rumours reached him of planned treachery by his younger brother John, Lord of Ireland and of the intentions of his former ally Philip II, who had left the Crusade shortly after the Siege of Acre, to conquer the Duchy of Normandy.

=== Crusade of 1197 ===
Another minor Crusade was proposed by the new Holy Roman Emperor, Henry VI. The former King of the Romans had succeeded his father Frederick and was free to pursue new campaigns. However, he would soon be diverted in a campaign against Tancred of Sicily, claiming the throne in the name of his wife Constance of Sicily. With the Holy Roman Empire and the Kingdom of Sicily warring against each other, the Byzantine Empire was left undisturbed by its two chief Western rivals until after Henry VI won his war in 1194.

Following this victory, Henry VI decided to resume his crusade against the Saracens. In Easter of 1195, he wrote a stern letter to the Byzantine Emperor Isaac Angelos demanding a heavy tribute to pay for his mercenary troops. However, Isaac was overthrown in a coup by his older brother Alexios III Angelos. A worse Emperor than his incompetent brother, he immediately submitted to the demands of Henry VI, melting valuable relics to extract the wealth needed to pay off Henry VI.

All of this would go to waste, however, when Henry VI died of a fever in Messina on 28 September 1197. Following his death a number of the higher ranking nobles abandoned the crusade to protect their interests in the Holy Roman Empire. When civil war broke out shortly after, the crusade found itself leaderless and in 1198 the crusaders retreated back to Tyre and sailed for home. The result was that the crusade had the detrimental effect of destroying Byzantium's dignity and wealth whilst failing to assist her against the Turks. It must be said however that the Byzantines after 1180 entertained no serious plans to reclaim Anatolia from the Turks, so how much territory Henry VI or his predecessor Frederick I seized may have been of little consequence in the long run.

=== Fourth Crusade ===
In 1198, Pope Innocent III broached the subject of a new crusade through legates and encyclical letters. There were few monarchs willing to lead the Crusade; Richard I of England was battling his former Crusader ally Phillip II Augustus – both had their fill from the Third Crusade. The Holy Roman Empire meanwhile was ravaged by civil war, as Philip of Swabia and Otto of Brunswick had both been elected Kings of Germany by rival factions. The divided Holy Roman Empire was in no position to assist her rival-in-religious authority in any military undertakings.

Instead, the Pope looked for nobles willing to lead the Crusade, much in the same manner as the First was. Theobald III, Count of Champagne was seen as the ideal candidate to lead the crusade. His mother Marie of France was a daughter of Louis VII of France and his first wife Eleanor of Aquitaine, making Marie a paternal half-sister of Philip II of France and maternal half-sister of Richard I of England, thus allowing Theobald to claim two former leaders of the Crusades as his uncles. His older brother Henry II, Count of Champagne had already served as consort to Queen regnant Isabella I of Jerusalem, giving Theobald another prominent crusading relation.

Theobald proposed a new approach to the crusades: rather than an attack into the territory of the newly established Ayyubid dynasty, which was well defended after its recent defeat of the Seljuk Empire and surrounded by allied Islamic factions, a more fruitful effort could be directed against Egypt, now the centre of Muslim power in the Levant, but with most of its best troops campaigning in the East. Egypt would have given the Crusaders immense resources and shortened their supply lines; the local Christian population would also have reduced the major problem of manpower.

The crusade went badly from the start – Theobald died in 1201 and the army that arrived at Venice in the summer of 1202 was one third the size that had been anticipated (4,500 knights, 9,000 squires, 20,000 men-at-arms expected). Consequently, there was not enough money to pay the Venetians, whose fleet was hired by the crusaders to take them to Egypt. Venetian policy under the aging and blind but still ambitious Doge Enrico Dandolo was potentially at variance with that of the Pope and the crusaders because Venice was closely related commercially with Egypt.). At the time, Venetian envoys were discussing trade terms with the Egyptians – but in the end, it was decided that such discussions would have allowed them to deceive the Egyptians.

"Signors, I myself am old and feeble; but if you will allow me to take the cross while my son remains in my place to guard the Republic, I am ready to live and to die with you"
Doge Dandolo to Boniface I, Marquess of Montferrat and other leading Franks present.

After stripping themselves of all potential wealth, the Crusaders remained 34,000 silver marks short of the 84,000 demanded by the Venetians. Realizing that no more money would come forth, Doge Dandolo gave the Crusaders a chance to pay off their debt by doing some fighting for Venice. The crusaders accepted the suggestion that in lieu of payment they assist the Venetians in the capture of the Christian port of Zara in Dalmatia. This former vassal city of Venice had rebelled and placed itself under the protection of the Kingdom of Hungary in 1186.

The Crusaders then set sail on 8 November 1202 with 480 ships, consisting of 50 large transports, 100 horse transport galleys, sixty war galleys and a number of other smaller ships. Zara fell on 15 November 1202 after a brief siege, though some sources suggest a later date of 24 November 1202. Innocent, who was informed of the plan, but his veto was disregarded, was reluctant to jeopardize the Crusade, and gave conditional absolution to the crusaders after having excommunicated them—not, however, to the Venetians.

== Alexios III Angelos ==
"Whatever paper might be presented to the Emperor (Alexios III) for his signature, he signed it immediately; it did not matter that in this paper there was a senseless agglomeration of words, or that the supplicant demanded that one might sail by land or till the sea, or that mountains should be transferred into the middle of the seas or, as a tale says, that Athos should be put upon Olympus."
Nicetas Choniates

Meanwhile, in Constantinople, the deposed Isaac II Angelos and his son Alexios IV Angelos were both in prison following the coup of Alexius III Angelos. However, Isaac was not destined to spend the rest of his days in jail; his young son Alexios IV escaped prison in the summer of 1203 and fled to the court of Philip of Swabia, the younger son of Frederick I Barbarossa. Philip and Alexius IV were brothers-in-law due to the former's marriage to the later's sister, Irene Angelina.

"None of you should therefore dare to assume that it is permissible for you to seize or to plunder the land of the Greeks, even though the latter may be disobedient to the Apostolic See, or on the grounds that the Emperor of Constantinople has deposed and even blinded his brother and usurped the imperial throne. For though this same emperor and the men entrusted to his rule may have sinned, both in these and in other matters, it is not for you to judge their faults, nor have you assumed the sign of the cross to punish this injury; rather you specifically pledged your self to the duty of avenging the insult to the cross."
Innocent III to Boniface I of Montferrat, Baldwin IX, Count of Flanders, and Louis I, Count of Blois (Ferentino, summer 1203, c. June 20).

Alexios appealed to Philip to help him and his father regains the Byzantine throne. Fortunately for Alexios IV, Phillip had good connections with the new leader of the Fourth Crusade, Boniface I of Montferrat (Theobald III, Count of Champagne had died in 1201). Therefore, when Alexios offered 500 Knights, 10,000 soldiers along with food and money to help the Crusaders with their drive to Egypt, Doge Dandolo and the other leaders of the Fourth Crusade happily accepted this new challenge. Both the money and the troops were desperately needed by the Crusaders as they had neither in the quantities they required- especially to pay off the Venetian debt of 34,000 silver marks. As an added bonus, Alexios IV promised to submit the Byzantine Church to the Church of Rome.

Innocent reprimanded the leaders of the crusaders and ordered them to proceed forthwith to the Holy Land.

Alexios III Angelos, the Byzantine Emperor at the time made no preparations for the defence of the city – there were few troops and very few military vessels. Military expenditure was seen as a waste by the corrupt emperors of the time and the money used for personal interests or on favourites. Thus, when the Venetian fleet entered the waters of Constantinople on 24 June 1203, they encountered little resistance. On 5 July 1203, the Crusader army crossed the Bosporus into the poorly defended commercial sector of the capital, Galata. A single tower was the only challenge to be found. Typically under-manned and under-supplied, the tower offered resistance for no more than 24 hours. Following this, the Crusaders launched an unsuccessful assault on the walls of Constantinople, repelled by the Varangian Guard. However, the decisive actions of the Venetian Doge allowed him and his fellow countrymen to land on the beaches and before long the walls were in the hands of the Crusaders. Alexios III fled; Isaac and later his son were crowned co-emperors on August 1, 1203.

The Duke of Venice, an old man and stone-blind, stood on the prow of his galley with the banner of St. Mark and ordered his men to drive the ship ashore. And so they did, and he leapt down and planted the banner before him in the ground. And when the others saw the standard of St Mark and the Doge's galley beached, they were ashamed and followed him ashore.

— Villehardouin

== Alexios IV Angelos ==
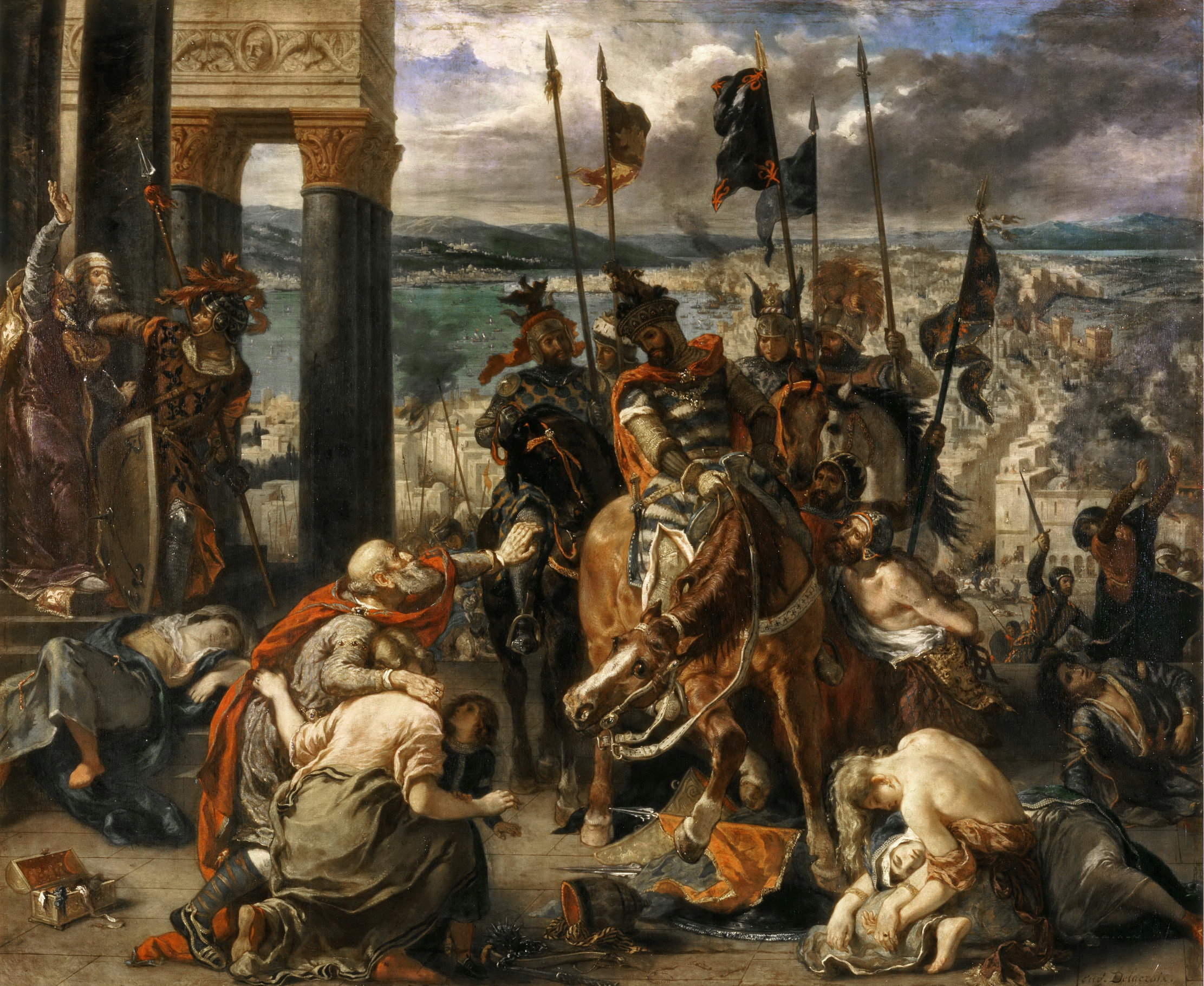
The Entry of the Crusaders into Constantinople, by Eugène Delacroix (1840, oil on canvas, 410 x 498 cm, Louvre, Paris).

Alexios IV soon began to realize that the generous offer promised to the Crusaders would not be met. He had managed to pay roughly half of the promised amount of 200,000 silver marks – whilst this had paid off the original 34,000 marks that the Crusaders were indebted, the Venetians had since demanded more money from the Crusade since their fleet was leased out for far longer than expected (due to a number of diversions). Making matters worse was Alexius IV's promise that he would cover the Venetians' rent of the fleet for the crusaders.

Meanwhile, the money (including the 100,000 silver marks owed by the Byzantine Emperor) was to be raised with heavy and unpopular taxes. It was not long before the people of Constantinople tired of the Crusaders presence – their demands led to the heavy taxes that were being spent on their upkeep. Furthermore, they began destroying the city, pillaging to "pay ourselves" as chronicler Robert de Clari had it.

On 19 August 1203, in an act of short-sighted zeal, some Crusaders went to the city and set the mosque, located outside the city walls, on fire. The fire spread, destroying not only the mosque but countless homes and churches. The fire was the worst to hit Constantinople since the Nika riots of 532, under the reign of Justinian I. A few days later, the Crusaders demanded their payment once again. When Alexios IV told them of the situation, the war became unavoidable.

== Alexios V Doukas ==
Both the Crusaders and the citizens of Constantinople agreed that Alexios IV had to go. On 25 January 1204, Alexios Doukas overthrew Alexios IV Angelos – his blind father was killed shortly after Alexios IV was strangled with a bow string. Doukas was loosely related to the imperial family by having as his mistress Eudokia Angelina, daughter of Alexios III and Euphrosyne Doukaina Kamatera. He took the throne for himself as Alexios V. The crusaders and Venetians, incensed at the murder of their supposed patron, prepared to assault the Byzantine capital. They decided that 12 electors (six Venetians and six crusaders) should choose a Latin emperor.

=== Final assault ===
Alexios V Doukas then gave Byzantium the leadership that she had lacked for over 30 years. He ordered the walls strengthened and fully manned. The height of the walls was increased such that the Venetian ships could not emulate their previous success.

Several initial assaults failed until the Doge had the ships tied into pairs, thus doubling their momentum as they sailed against the fortifications. As the Venetians seized two towers, the Frankish Crusaders took a gate and opened it to their comrades. Alexios V tried to rally a counter-attack but when this failed, he fled to Thrace with his mistress Eudokia Angelina and her mother Euphrosyne Doukaina Kamatera. There Alexios V and Eudokia were married, solidifying his relation to the Angeloi. He was later captured by the Crusaders in 1205 and flung to death.

Meanwhile, the city was sacked for three days. The Franks wrecked the city, destroying more than necessary. The Venetians began pillaging and taking what treasures they could find – least of which were the famous Horses of Saint Mark. Enrico Dandolo sent them to Venice as part of his loot. They would be placed on the terrace of the façade of St Mark's Basilica in 1254. They would remain there until the sack of Venice by general Napoléon Bonaparte of the French First Republic in 1797. Bonaparte sent them to Paris where they remained until the Bourbon Restoration of 1815. They were then returned to Venice where they still remain.

A contemporary account describes the wanton destruction spread by the Crusaders in the fallen city:

They smashed the holy images and hurled the sacred relixs of the Martyrs into places I am ashamed to mention, scattering everywhere the body and blood of the Saviour...As for their profanation of the Great Church, they destroyed the high altar and shared out the pieces among themselves...And they brought horses and mules into the Church, the better to carry of the holy vessels, and the pulpit, and the doors, and the furniture wherever it was to be found; and when some of these beasts slipped and fell they ran them through with their swords, fouling the Church with their blood and ordure. A common harlot was enthroned in the Patriarch's chair, to hurl insults at Jesus Christ; and she sang bawdy songs, and danced immodestly in the holy place...nor was there mercy shown to virtuous matrons, innocent maids or even virgins consecrated to God...

— Nicetas Choniates,

When Innocent III heard of the conduct of his crusaders, he castigated them in no uncertain terms. But the situation was beyond his control, especially after his legate, on his own initiative, had absolved the crusaders from their vow to proceed to the Holy Land.

When order had been restored, the crusaders and the Venetians proceeded to implement their agreement; Baldwin of Flanders was elected emperor and the Venetian Thomas Morosini chosen patriarch. The lands parcelled out among the leaders did not include all the former Byzantine possessions. The Byzantine rule continued in Nicaea, Trebizond, and Epirus.

== See also ==
- Angelos dynasty and related family tree
- Family tree of Byzantine emperors
- Byzantine Empire under the Justinian dynasty
- Byzantine Empire under the Heraclian dynasty
- Byzantine Empire under the Isaurian dynasty
- Byzantine Empire under the Macedonian dynasty
- Byzantine Empire under the Doukas dynasty
- Byzantine Empire under the Komnenos dynasty
- Byzantine Empire under the Palaiologos dynasty

== Sources ==
- Philip Sherrard, Great Ages of Man Byzantium, Time-Life Books, 1975.
- Madden, Thomas F. Crusades the Illustrated History. 1st ed. Ann Arbor: University of Michigan, 2005.
- Parker, Geoffrey. Compact History of the World, 4th ed. London: Times Books, 2005.
- Mango, Cyril. The Oxford History of Byzantium, 1st ed. New York: Oxford UP, 2002.
- Grant, R G. Battle: a Visual Journey Through 5000 Years of Combat. London: Dorling Kindersley, 2005.
- Haldon, John. Byzantium at War 600 – 1453. New York: Osprey, 2000.
- Norwich, John Julius (1997). A Short History of Byzantium. New York: Vintage Books.
