= William Longsword of Montferrat =

Count of Jaffa and Ascalon

William Longsword (1140s – June 1177) was a member of the House of Montferrat from northern Italy who became the count of Jaffa and Ascalon in the Kingdom of Jerusalem. As a cousin of Emperor Frederick Barbarossa and King Louis VII of France, William was chosen by the High Court of Jerusalem to marry Sibylla, the heir presumptive to the kingdom. William may have expected to rule in the name of her young and sick brother, King Baldwin IV. He arrived in the kingdom in late 1176, but the nobility were no longer well-disposed to the proposed match. William nevertheless married Sibylla and as her husband, received Jaffa and Ascalon. Because Baldwin IV had leprosy, it seemed likely that William would eventually succeed him as king. William died of an illness within months of his marriage, however, leaving Sibylla pregnant with their son, Baldwin V. Rumors spread in Europe that William had been poisoned.

== Background ==
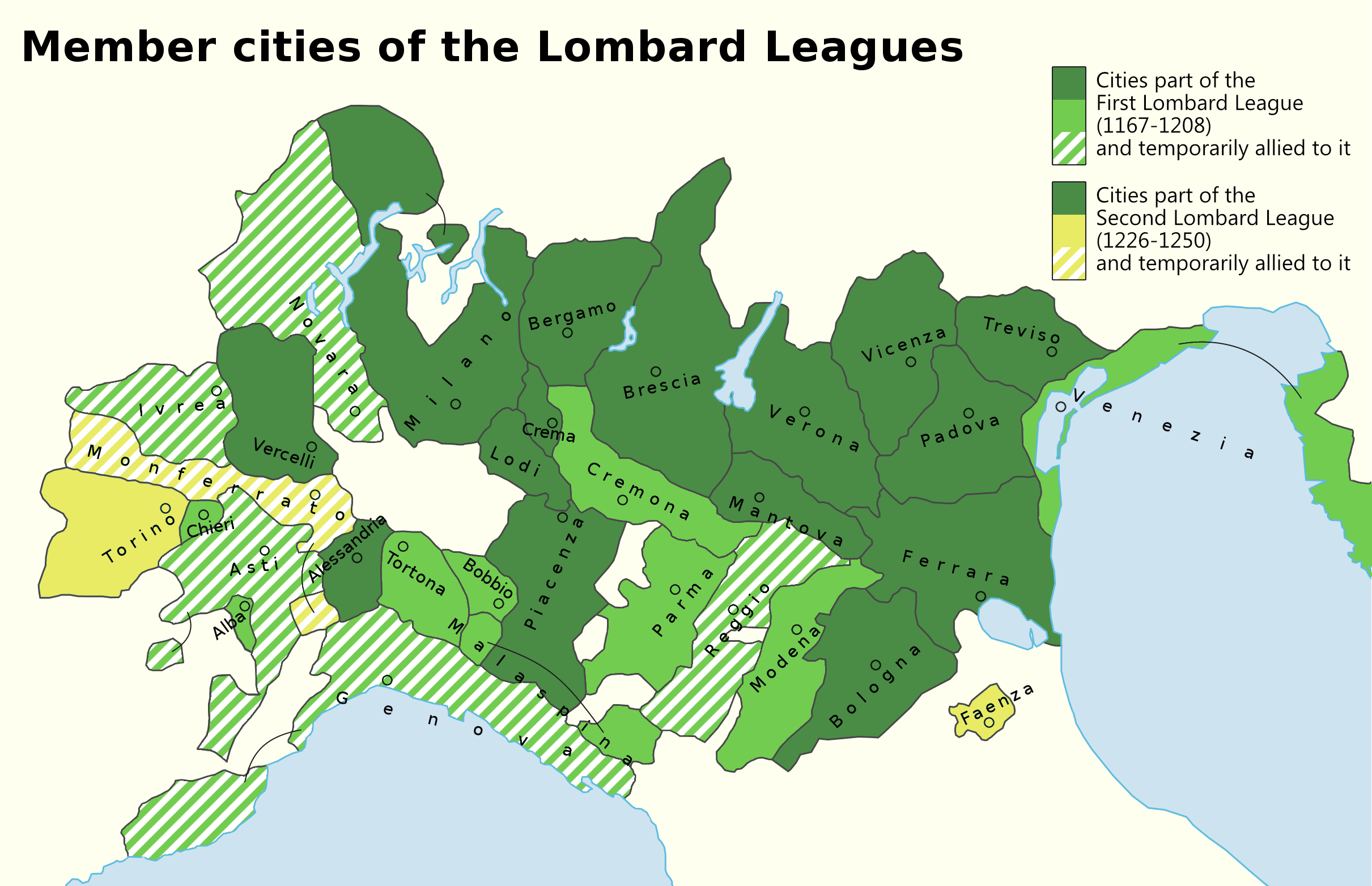
The March of Montferrat (yellow) supported the emperor against the Lombard League (green).

William was born in the 1140s. (Note: Archbishop William of Tyre describes William Longsword as adolescens (a young man) in 1176; because William Longsword would have been in his thirties by that time, the historian Helen J. Nicholson interprets the archbishop's remark as referring to a lively and rash character.) Hailing from Piedmont, he was the eldest son of Marquis William V of Montferrat, a vassal of the Holy Roman Emperor Frederick Barbarossa. William Longsword's mother, Judith, was the daughter of the Babenberger margrave of Austria, Leopold III. Through his grandmothers, Agnes of Waiblingen and Gisela of Burgundy, William was the first cousin of both Emperor Frederick and King Louis VII of France, a relationship emphasized by Archbishop William of Tyre. The House of Montferrat loyally supported the emperor in his long conflict with the Lombard League, who were allied with the papacy and King William II of Sicily.

William, in the words of the archbishop of Tyre, grew to be "reasonably tall" and "a good-looking young man with reddish-gold hair". He was trained in warfare since childhood, and his nickname, "Longsword", pointed to his military prowess. The young William's father participated in the Second Crusade in the Levant, and the Montferrat family enjoyed a good reputation in the crusader states of the Levant thanks to his crusading efforts. 15th-century Piedmontese publications celebrating the family's various overseas engagements alleged that the younger William also took part in the Second Crusade, but modern scholarship rejects the notion. The historian Walter Haberstumpf contends that William Longsword would have been well-acquainted, even if only indirectly, with the state of affairs in the Levant.

William's kin, with kings in bold

**Henry IV of Germany**
William I of Burgundy
Humbert II of Savoy	Gisela of Burgundy	Rainier of Montferrat	Leopold III of Austria	Agnes of Waiblingen	Frederick I of Swabia	Stephen I of Burgundy
Adelaide of Maurienne	William V of Montferrat	Judith of Babenberg	Henry II of Austria	**Conrad III of Germany**	Frederick II of Swabia	Reginald III of Burgundy
**Louis VII of France**	William Longsword	Leopold V of Austria	**Frederick I of Germany**	Beatrice I of Burgundy

== Marriage negotiations ==
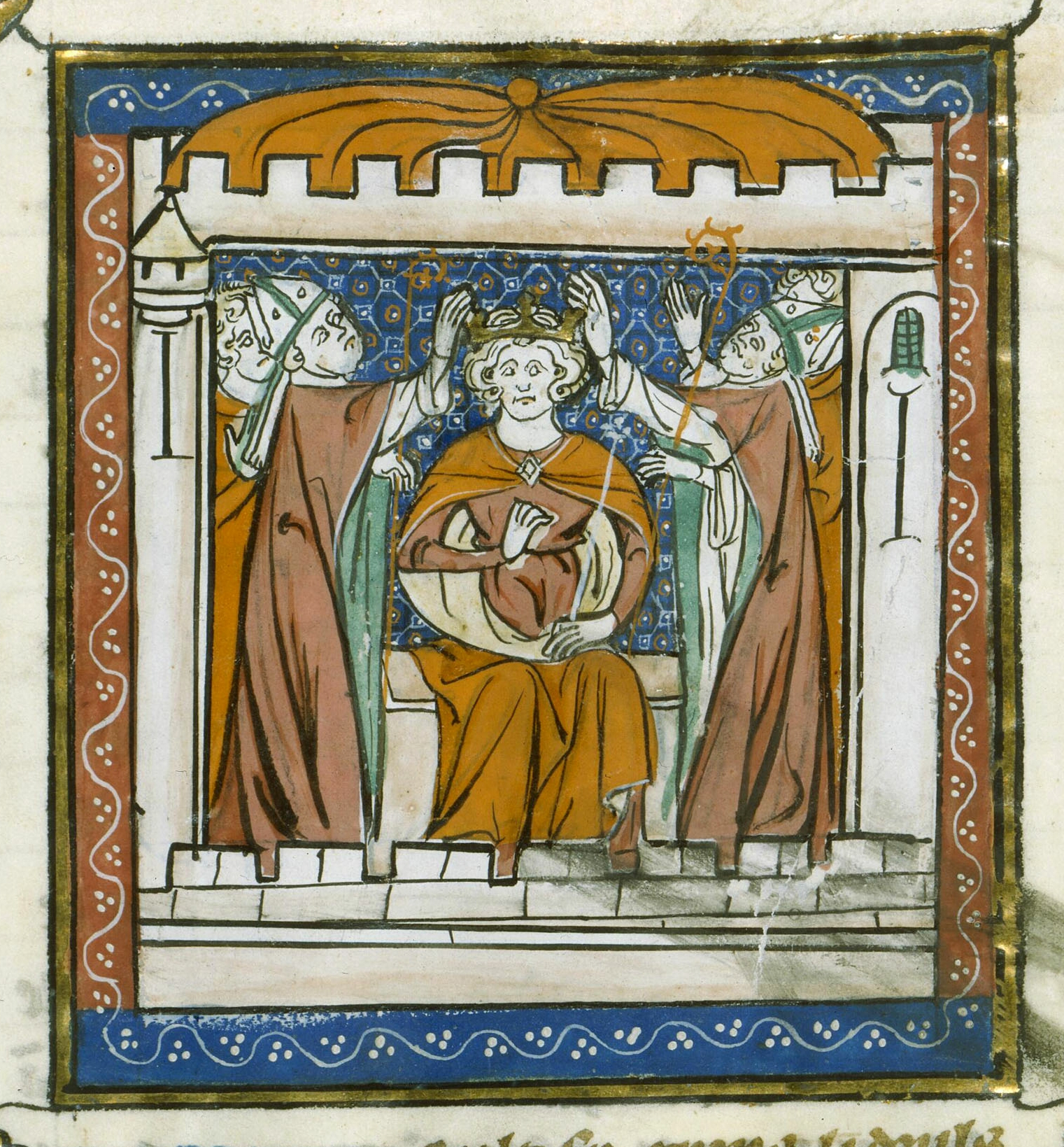
Because he had leprosy, King Baldwin IV sought a husband for his sister, Sibylla, who would succeed him.

In 1176, after a discussion in the High Court of Jerusalem, William was offered a marriage with Sibylla, the older sister and heir presumptive of the young King Baldwin IV of Jerusalem. Because Baldwin had leprosy and could not marry, the royal government considered Sibylla's marriage crucial: a brother-in-law could rule the kingdom as regent and eventually succeed Baldwin as king. The historian Giuseppe Ligato has argued that William received no specific promises during the marriage negotiations about what his role in the kingdom would be. The historian Bernard Hamilton agrees with Ligato, but adds that it must have been presumed that William would succeed to the throne after Baldwin died or became too ill.

When the marriage was offered to William, it seemed likely that Emperor Frederick would prevail over his enemies in Lombardy. Frederick too had taken part in the Second Crusade and was clearly committed to the Kingdom of Jerusalem. Hamilton presumes that the royal government in Jerusalem, led by Count Raymond III of Tripoli in the name of the young king, may therefore have expected that William's marriage with Sibylla would place the kingdom under imperial protection. The king and all the noblemen and clergymen of the kingdom swore that William would be married to Sibylla and invested with the County of Jaffa and Ascalon within 40 days of his arrival in the kingdom. To the historian Helen J. Nicholson, this oath suggests that Sibylla's previous betrothal, to Count Stephen I of Sancerre, failed to materialize into marriage because the king and the noblemen prevaricated, something William would have wished to avoid. The historian Hans Eberhard Mayer points to the similarity between William's contract and the one made with Count Fulk V of Anjou for his marriage with Melisende, daughter and heir of King Baldwin II of Jerusalem.

On his way east, William came to Genoa in August 1176. The Genoese sought his support in settling their affairs in the crusader kingdom. William issued a document, solemnly promising that he would help the city-state keep their rights and possessions within the kingdom and recover those that they had lost. The promise came with restrictions, however, as William did not wish to get into trouble after his arrival: he would not wage war on their behalf nor would he aid them in recovering anything from the king's domain or from the county which he was to receive. A Genoese fleet then escorted William to the Levant.

William Longsword arrived in the crusader kingdom in early October 1176, landing in Sidon. He found that he was no longer welcome: Archbishop William of Tyre records that the groom was even outright "opposed by certain of those men by whose advice he had been summoned". The archbishop does not say why. The noblemen claimed that they had not adequately considered the matter at the time and had since come to oppose it. Hamilton believes that the decisive defeat of Emperor Frederick by the Lombard League at Legnano on 29 May made the alliance undesirable to the nobility of the kingdom, for Frederick was not only unable to assist them but was also still at war with the pope and the king of Sicily, whose aid was also needed. Nicholson proposes that the nobility may have been concerned that William, once king, would try to exclude Sibylla from power, as King Fulk had tried to do to Queen Melisende. Because of William's exceptional connections, especially with Genoa and the king of France, it was nevertheless unwise to break the betrothal. Sibylla's reputation would have been harmed too, possibly irreparably, because she had already been rejected by the count of Sancerre.

== Countship ==
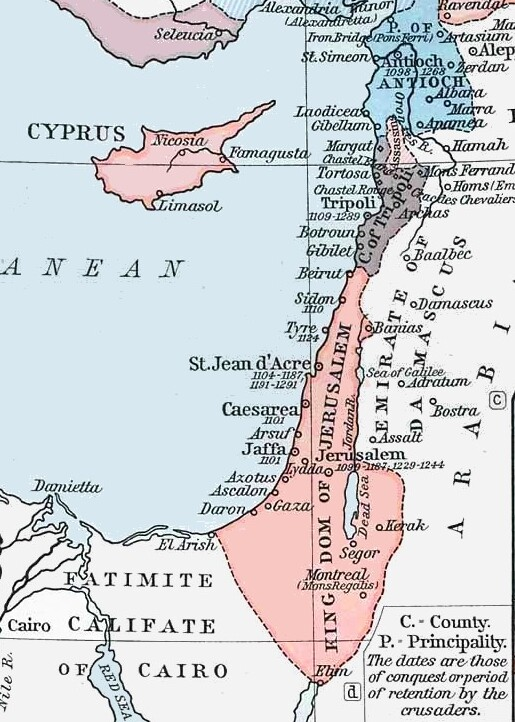
William and Sibylla's county was centered on the towns of Jaffa and Ascalon in the south of the kingdom.

William's marriage to Sibylla, who was then aged around 17, was celebrated in November 1176, six weeks after his arrival. The couple received the County of Jaffa and Ascalon, which had belonged to Sibylla and Baldwin's father, Amalric, before he became king; this may have marked the couple as heirs to the throne. Archbishop William of Tyre describes Count William as brave, generous, honest, and unpretentious, qualities which Hamilton notes were admired in the 12th-century nobility; but also quick-tempered, gluttonous, and a heavy drinker (though "this did not impair his judgement"), traits undesirable in a king of Jerusalem. In a chronicle written in the late 12th and early 13th century, the cleric Tolosanus of Faenza commended William's appearance, integrity, sexual restraint, and faithfulness to his wife. Tolosanus called Sibylla Beneesente, meaning "benevolent" or "well-disposed"; Nicholson interprets this as possibly William's pet name for Sibylla.

According to Bishop Sicard of Cremona, King Baldwin offered to relinquish the throne to William, but William refused. Hamilton considers this possible: Baldwin knew he had leprosy and had found a suitable successor, but William was wary of the opposition he faced. Sicard also narrates that William held the whole kingdom in his care, a claim which Hamilton finds unsubstantiated. At most, Hamilton argues, William could have expected to deputise for the king if the king became too ill to rule. Haberstumpf, on the other hand, accepts the narrative in Benvenuto di Sangiorgio's 15th-century Chronicle of Montferrat, according to which William and Sibylla exercised royal power in Jerusalem. According to Haberstumpf, the stories of William's parents and brother Renier coming on pilgrimage and assisting him in the government and William taking action against the Egyptian ruler Saladin are, respectively, "a late invention of Piedmontese chroniclers" and "almost certainly false".

Jaffa and Ascalon were detached from the royal domain to be Sibylla's dowry and her fief; although he bore the comital title, William was not count in his own right but rather administered the fief on behalf of his wife. The prosperous county gave the couple considerable power and influence within the kingdom. Under William and Sibylla, the long title "count of Jaffa and Ascalon" first appears, but William was also known to contemporaries simply as the "count of Jaffa". No more than three documents issued by William as count survive; two of these mention Sibylla's consent. These were the grant of land (with Sibylla's consent) to the monastery of St. Mary and the Holy Spirit on Mount Sion near Jerusalem; a confirmation of King Baldwin's agreement with the canons of the Holy Sepulchre (in which case he may have acted as the designated heir); and the agreement (with Sibylla) to a charter by which the king confirmed Raynald of Châtillon and Stephanie of Milly's donation of land to the new military-religious Order of Mountjoy. Nicholson concludes that William and Raynald cooperated efficiently and hoped that the order would help them defend their lands against the Muslims to the south.

== Death and aftermath ==
In April 1177, while King Baldwin was preparing to attack Egypt, William fell ill in Ascalon. The illness lasted two months. King Baldwin visited him and fell gravely ill too. The king recovered, but his brother-in-law did not: William died in June, leaving Sibylla pregnant. His body was transported to Jerusalem and interred in the vestibule of the Hospital of St John. Because the patriarch too was unwell, Archbishop William presided over the funeral.

Suspicion arose in Europe that William had been poisoned. The Continuatio Aquicinctina, composed at the Anchin Abbey in northeastern France and covering the period from 1149 to 1237, records that William was poisoned by knights. Tolosanus of Faenza attributed William's death to witchcraft by William's mother-in-law and her daughter; they did it "because he seemed in no way to care for them". Nicholson notes that Sibylla's mother, Agnes of Courtenay, had no other daughters and concludes that the accusation must refer to the countess's stepmother, Queen Maria Komnene, and 3-year-old half-sister Isabella. Nicholson interprets the account as suggesting that the dowager queen had attempted to seduce William and then retaliated after he refused her. Haberstumpf, however, reads the account as placing blame on Sibylla and Agnes. Hamilton and Nicholson both consider it most likely that the archbishop of Tyre had it right: William succumbed to an illness to which he had no immunity, his resistance weakened by his eating habits. The historian Malcolm Barber notes that William's fate was not uncommon among the newcomers to the Levant.

Sibylla was left to rule the county alone. She gave birth to William's posthumous son, Baldwin V, in the winter of 1177-8. William's family continued to support her and her son. By 1190, Baldwin IV, Baldwin V, and Sibylla were dead; William's brother Conrad married Sibylla's half-sister, Isabella, and briefly reigned as king until his assassination. In Europe, the memory of William remained only in Piedmontese chronicles and in the verses which Peire Bremon lo Tort, a troubadour returning from the Levant to Europe, dedicated to him.

== Sources ==
- Barber, Malcolm (2012). The Crusader States. Yale University Press. ISBN 978-0300189315.
- Bolton, Brenda (1 January 2008). "A Matter Of Great Confusion: King Richard I And Syria's Vetus De Monte". Diplomatics in the Eastern Mediterranean 1000-1500. Brill. pp. 171–203. ISBN 978-90-474-3303-3.
- Haberstumpf, Walter (1989). "Guglielmo Lungaspada di Monferrato, conte di Ascalona e di Giaffa (1176—1177)". Studi Piemontesi (in Italian). 18: 601–8.
- Hamilton, Bernard (2000). The Leper King and His Heirs: Baldwin IV and the Crusader Kingdom of Jerusalem. Cambridge University Press. ISBN 9780521017473.
- Mayer, Hans Eberhard (1994). Kings and Lords in the Latin Kingdom of Jerusalem. Routledge. ISBN 9780860784166.
- Mayer, Hans Eberhard (1984). "John of Jaffa, His Opponents, and His Fiefs". Proceedings of the American Philosophical Society. 128 (2). American Philosophical Society: 134–163. ISSN 0003-049X. JSTOR 986227.
- Nicholson, Helen J. (2022). Sybil, Queen of Jerusalem, 1186–1190. Routledge & CRC Press.

Titles of nobility
Vacant In royal domain Title last held by Amalric	Count of Jaffa and Ascalon; 1176-1177	Succeeded by Sibylla
