= Boniface I of Montferrat =

9th Marquis of Montferrat (r. 1192–1207); leader of the Fourth Crusade

Boniface I
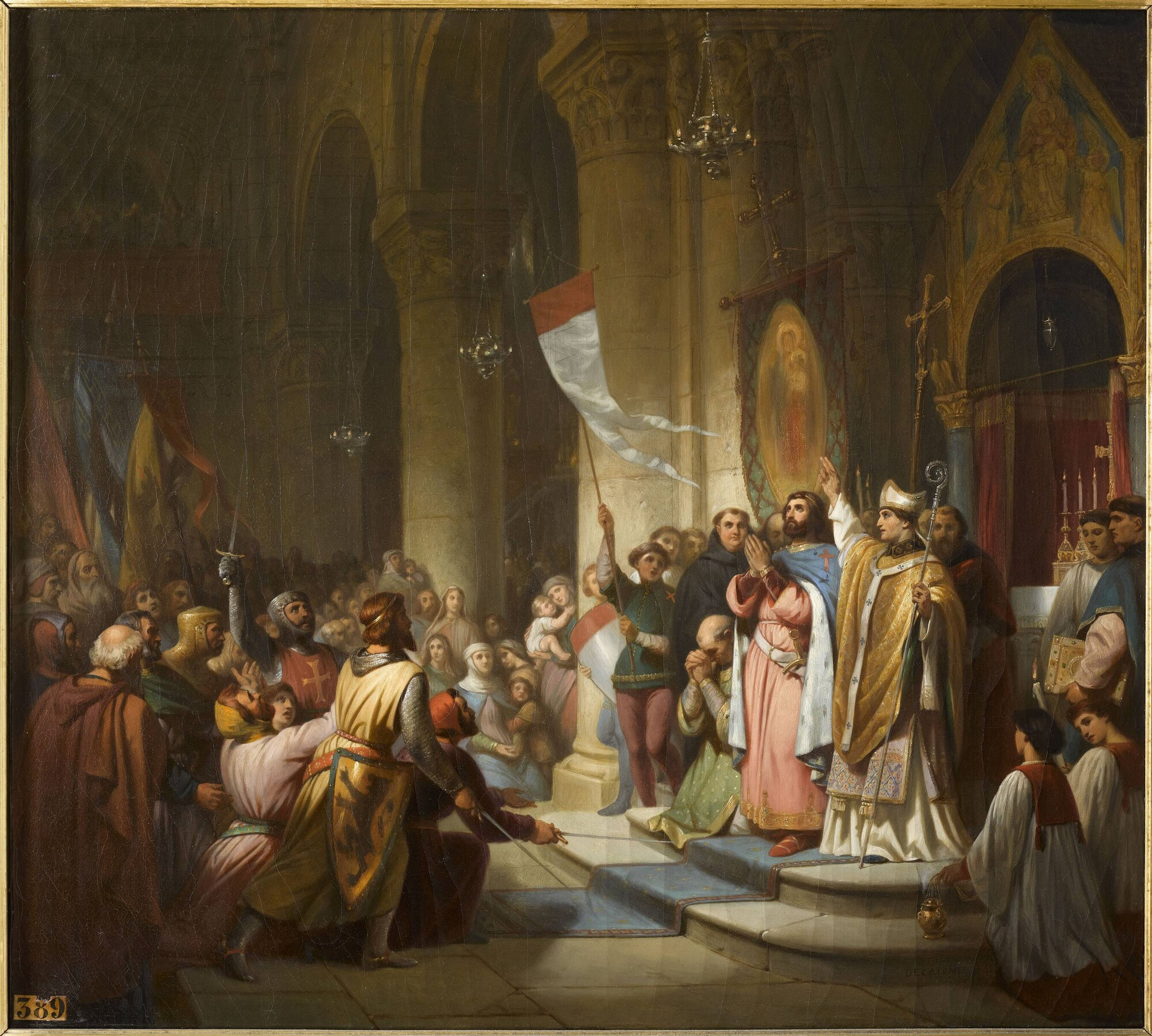
- Boniface elected as leader of the Fourth Crusade, Soissons, 1201: history painting by Henri Decaisne, early 1840s, Salles des Croisades, Versailles.

Marquis of Montferrat
- Reign: 1192 – 4 September 1207
- Predecessor: Conrad
- Successor: William VI

King of Thessalonica
- Reign: 1205 – 4 September 1207
- Successor: Demetrius of Montferrat
- Born: c. 1150
- Died: 4 September 1207 (aged c. 57)
- Spouse: Elena del Bosco; Margaret of Hungary
- Issue: William VI of Montferrat; Beatrice of Montferrat; Agnes of Montferrat; Demetrius of Montferrat
- House: Aleramici
- Father: William V of Montferrat
- Mother: Judith of Babenberg

Boniface I (Italian: Bonifacio del Monferrato; Greek: Βονιφάτιος Μομφερρατικός, romanized: Vonifatios Momferratikos; c. 1150 – 4 September 1207) was the marquis of Montferrat from 1192, a leader of the Fourth Crusade (1201–04) and the king of Thessalonica (from 1205).

== Early life ==
Boniface was the third son of William V of Montferrat and Judith of Babenberg, born after his father's return from the Second Crusade. He was a younger brother of William "Longsword", Count of Jaffa and Ascalon, and of Conrad I of Jerusalem. His youthful exploits in the late 1170s are recalled in the famous "epic letter", Valen marques, senher de Monferrat, by his good friend and court troubadour, Raimbaut de Vaqueiras. These included the rescue of the heiress Jacopina of Ventimiglia from her uncle Count Otto, who was intending to deprive her of her inheritance and send her to Sardinia. Boniface arranged a marriage for her. When Albert of Malaspina (husband of one of Boniface's sisters) abducted Saldina de Mar, a daughter of a prominent Genoese family, Boniface rescued her and restored her to her lover, Ponset d'Aguilar. Like the rest of the family, he also supported his cousin Frederick I Barbarossa in their wars against the independent city communes of the Lombard League.

Boniface's eldest brother, William, had died in 1177, soon after marrying Sibylla, the heiress presumptive to the Kingdom of Jerusalem. In 1179, the Byzantine emperor Manuel I Komnenos offered his daughter Maria Porphyrogenita as a bride to one of the sons of William V. Since Boniface, like his older brother Conrad, was already married, and Frederick was a priest, the youngest brother, Renier, married her instead, only to be murdered along with her during the usurpation of Andronikos.

In 1183, Boniface's nephew Baldwin V was crowned co-king of Jerusalem. William V went out to the kingdom to support his grandson, leaving Conrad and Boniface in charge of Montferrat. However, in 1187, Conrad also left for the East: Isaac II Angelos had offered his sister Theodora to Boniface as a wife, to renew the family's Byzantine alliance, but Boniface had just married for the second time, while Conrad was a recent widower.

In 1189, Boniface joined the council of regency for Thomas I of Savoy, son of his cousin Humbert III, until the boy came of age about two years later. In 1191, after the new Emperor Henry VI granted him the county of Incisa, a fifteen-year war broke out against the neighbouring communes of Asti and Alessandria. Boniface joined the Cremona League, while the two cities joined the League of Milan. Boniface defeated the cities at Montiglio in June that year, but the war as a whole went badly for the dynasty's interests. At Quarto, he and Vaqueiras saved his brother-in-law Alberto of Malaspina when he was unhorsed. The first phase of the war ended with a truce in April 1193. By now, Boniface was Marquis of Montferrat, following the deaths of his father in 1191 and of Conrad, the newly elected king of Jerusalem, in 1192. No claim to Montferrat ever seems to have been made on behalf of Conrad's posthumous daughter, Maria of Montferrat.

In June 1194, Boniface was appointed one of the leaders of Henry VI's expedition to Sicily. At Messina, amid the fighting between the Genoese and Pisan fleets, Vaqueiras protected his lord with his own shield – an act which helped the troubador win a knighthood from Boniface that year, after the campaign's successful conclusion: Henry's coronation in Palermo. In October 1197, the truce with Asti ended. Boniface made an alliance with Acqui in June 1198. There were numerous skirmishes and raids, including at Ricaldone and Caranzano, but by 1199 it was clear the war was lost, and Boniface entered into negotiations.

Throughout the 1180s and 1190s, despite the wars, Boniface had nevertheless presided over one of the most prestigious courts of chivalric culture and troubador song. In the 12th century, the Piedmontese language (which in the present day reflects more French and Italian influences) was virtually indistinguishable from the Occitan of Southern France and Catalonia. Besides Vaqueiras, visitors included Peire Vidal, Gaucelm Faidit, and Arnaut de Mareuil. Boniface's patronage was celebrated widely. To Gaucelm, he was Mon Thesaur (My Treasure). Curiously, Vaqueiras sometimes addressed him as N'Engles (Lord Englishman), but the in-joke is never explained. His sister Azalaïs, Marchioness of Saluzzo, also shared this interest and was mentioned by Vidal.

== Fourth Crusade ==
When the original leader of the Fourth Crusade, Count Theobald III of Champagne, died in 1201, Boniface was chosen as its new leader. He was an experienced soldier, and it was an opportunity to reassert his dynasty's reputation after defeat at home. Boniface's family was well known in the east: his nephew Baldwin and brother Conrad had been kings of Jerusalem, and his niece Maria was the heir presumptive to the kingdom.

Boniface's cousin Philip of Swabia was married to Irene Angelina, a daughter of the deposed Byzantine emperor Isaac II Angelos and niece of Conrad's second wife Theodora. In the winter of 1201 Boniface spent Christmas with Phillip in Hagenau, and while there also met with Alexios IV Angelos, Isaac II's son, who had escaped from the custody of his uncle Alexios III Angelos. At this time the three discussed the possibility of using the crusading army to restore Alexios' right to the throne. Both Boniface and Alexios travelled separately to Rome to ask for Pope Innocent III's blessing for the endeavour. Boniface was specifically told by Innocent not to attack any Christians, including the Byzantines.

The Crusader army was in debt to Enrico Dandolo, the doge of Venice, who had provided their fleet. He instructed them to attack the rebellious cities of Trieste, Muggia, and Zara and beat them into submission before sailing for Cairo. The Pope was angered by these Christian cities being attacked by a Crusader army. Dandolo, was now the true war leader of this Crusade, with Boniface as only a figurehead. Alexios IV Angelus made many promises to the Crusaders and their principal financier, the doge of Venice, for riches and honors if they would help him reclaim his empire. Dandolo placated the Pope by having Alexius Angelus promise to submit the Orthodox Church to Rome when he was restored to his throne in Constantinople. This being done, the fleet set sail for Constantinople in 1203.

After the conquest of Constantinople in 1204, Boniface was assumed to be the new emperor, both by the western knights and the conquered Byzantine citizens. However, the Venetians vetoed him, believing that he already had too many connections in the Empire and, likely, felt that they would not have as much influence in the empire if Boniface was in control. Instead, they chose Baldwin of Flanders. Boniface founded the Kingdom of Thessalonica and also held all the territories that lay east of Bosphorus and territories in Crete, though he later conceded Crete to Baldwin. Late 13th and 14th century sources suggest that Boniface based his claim to Thessalonica on the statement that his younger brother Renier had been granted Thessalonica on his marriage to Maria Komnene in 1180.

Boniface was killed in an ambush by the Vlach on 4 September 1207, and his head was sent to Bulgarian Tsar Kaloyan. The loyal Raimbaut de Vaqueiras, who had followed him to the East, probably died with him: it is significant that he composed no planh (lament) in his memory.

== Family ==
Boniface was first married c. 1170 to Elena del Bosco. They had:

- William VI, (c. 1173-17 September 1226). Marquis of Montferrat
- Beatrice, married Enrico del Carretto, Marquis of Savona, as the second of his three wives; she is the Bel Cavalher (Fair Knight) of Vaqueiras's songs, composed in the 1190s.
- Agnes of Montferrat (d. 1207), m. Henry of Flanders, Latin emperor of Constantinople, in 1207

In 1205 in Constantinople he married Margaret of Hungary, daughter of King Béla III of Hungary and widow of Emperor Isaac II Angelos. They had one child:

- Demetrius, born c. 1205, who was King of Thessalonica.

== Sources ==
- Harris, Jonathan (2003). Byzantium and the Crusades. Hambledon Continuum.
- Kosi, Miha (2021). "The Babenberg Dukes of Austria crusaders – "par excellence"". In Bronstein, Judith; Fishhof, Gil; Shotten-Hallel, Vardit (eds.). Settlement and Crusade in the Thirteenth Century: Multidisciplinary Studies of the Latin East. Routledge.
- Haberstumpf, Walter (1995), Dinastie europee nel Mediterraneo orientale. I Monferrato e i Savoia nei secoli XII–XV, Torino: Scriptorium
- Lock, Peter (2015). The Franks in the Aegean: 1204–1500. Routledge.
- Murray, Alan V. (2006). "William VI of Montferrat (d. 1225)". In Murray, Alan V. (ed.). The Crusades: An Encyclopedia. Vol. IV: Q–Z. ABC-CLIO.
- Runciman, Steven (1951–1954), A history of the Crusades, Cambridge: Cambridge University Press
- Van Tricht, Filip (2011). The Latin Renovatio of Byzantium: The Empire of Constantinople (1204–1228). Leiden: Brill. ISBN 978-90-04-20323-5.

Preceded by Conrad	Marquis of Montferrat; 1192–1207	Succeeded by William VI
New title	King of Thessalonica; 1205–1207	Succeeded by Demetrius
