= Conrad of Montferrat =

Italian nobleman and crusader, King of Jerusalem from 1190 to 1192

Conrad I
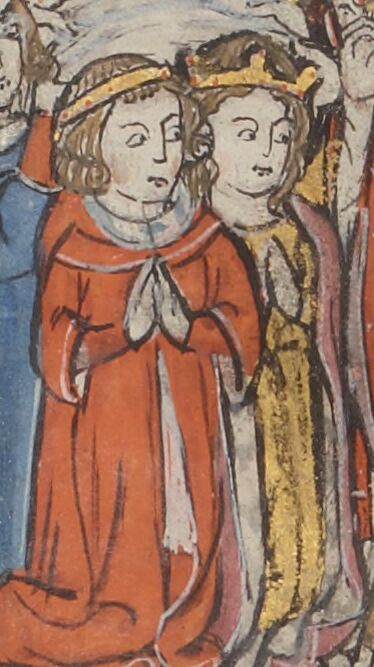
- 13th-century depiction of Conrad's marriage to Isabella

King of Jerusalem
- Reign: 1190–1192
- Predecessors: Sibylla and Guy
- Successor: Isabella I
- Co-ruler: Isabella I
- Contender: Guy (1190–1192)

Marquis of Montferrat
- Reign: 1191–1192
- Predecessor: William V
- Successor: Boniface I
- Born: c. 1146; Montferrat, Kingdom of Italy (Holy Roman Empire)
- Died: 28 April 1192 (aged 45–46); Tyre, Kingdom of Jerusalem
- Spouses: Unknown first wife Theodora Angelina (m. 1187, ann. 1190); Isabella I of Jerusalem (m. 1190)
- Issue: Maria, Queen of Jerusalem
- House: Aleramici
- Father: William V, Marquess of Montferrat
- Mother: Judith of Babenberg
- Religion: Roman Catholicism

Conrad of Montferrat (Note: (Italian: Corrado del Monferrato; Piedmontese: Conrà ëd Monfrà)) (c. 1146 – 28 April 1192) was an Italian nobleman, one of the major participants in the Third Crusade. He was the de facto King of Jerusalem (as Conrad I) by virtue of his marriage to Isabella I of Jerusalem from 24 November 1190, but officially elected only in 1192, days before his death. He was also the eighth Marquess of Montferrat from 1191.

Conrad was the second son of William V of Montferrat and Judith of Babenberg. In his early career, he established himself as a skilled diplomat and general in the Byzantine Empire. After fighting on their behalf against Frederick Barbarossa, Conrad was awarded the title of Caesar by Isaac II Angelos. However, having previously sworn to take the cross, he left for the Kingdom of Jerusalem in 1187 shortly after the Battle of Hattin.

Upon his arrival in Tyre, Conrad organized the city's defenses and successfully repelled Saladin's forces. When Guy of Lusignan, the king of Jerusalem by right of his wife Queen Sibylla, was released from captivity in 1189, Conrad refused to allow him to enter the city. He was convinced to join Guy at the Siege of Acre later that year.

When Sibylla died of disease in 1190, Guy no longer had a claim to the throne, whose heiress was Sibylla's half-sister Isabella. The nobility consequently forced Isabella to annul her marriage to Humphrey IV of Toron so that she could marry Conrad instead. The succession of the kingdom would finally be settled in 1192, when Conrad was formally elected king. Just days later, however, Conrad would be killed by the Order of Assassins.

== Early life ==
Conrad was born in around 1146 in Montferrat, which was a margraviate of the Kingdom of Italy in the Holy Roman Empire at the time; it is now a region of Piedmont in northwest Italy. He was the second son of Marquess William V of Montferrat, "the Elder", a vassal of the Holy Roman Emperor Frederick Barbarossa. His mother, Judith of Babenberg, was the daughter of the margrave of Austria, Leopold III. Conrad was the first cousin of both Frederick Barbarossa and King Louis VII of France through his grandmothers, Agnes of Waiblingen and Gisela of Burgundy.

Little is known about Conrad's early life. He is first mentioned in a charter in 22 September 1160, when serving at the court of his maternal uncle, Conrad of Babenberg, Bishop of Passau, who he may have been named after. Negotiations were made from 1166 to 1168 to marry one of William V's sons to one of Henry II of England's daughters, but it is unknown if this was in reference to Conrad. In 1172, Conrad appeared alongside Frederick Barbarossa; his family supported Emperor Frederick in his conflict with the Lombard League. When the Lombard League defeated Frederick on 29 May 1176 at the Battle of Legnano, Conrad took part in the peace negotiations alongside Christian of Mainz, a diplomat of the emperor.

Conrad's relationship with Christian went south in 1178, when Christian besieged the city of Viterbo to force its submission to Pope Alexander III; when the city submitted, Conrad led a revolt against him. In September of 1179, Conrad successfully captured Christian as a hostage, keeping him imprisoned for fifteen months.

He was active in diplomacy from his twenties, and became an effective military commander, campaigning alongside other members of his family in the struggles with the Lombard League. He first married an unidentified lady before 1179, but she was dead by the end of 1186, without leaving any surviving issue.

== Byzantine Empire ==
In 1179, following the family's alliance with Manuel I Comnenos, Conrad led an army against Frederick Barbarossa's forces, then commanded by the imperial Chancellor, Archbishop Christian of Mainz. He defeated them at Camerino in September, taking the Chancellor hostage. (He had previously been a hostage of the Chancellor.) He left the captive in his brother Boniface's care and went to Constantinople to be rewarded by the Emperor, returning to Italy shortly after Manuel's death in 1180. Now in his mid-thirties, his personality and good looks made a striking impression at the Byzantine court: Niketas Choniates describes him as "of beautiful appearance, comely in life's springtime, exceptional and peerless in manly courage and intelligence, and in the flower of his body's strength".

In the winter of 1186–1187, Isaac II Angelus offered his sister, Theodora, as a bride to Conrad's younger brother Boniface, to renew the Byzantine alliance with Montferrat, but Boniface was married. Conrad, recently widowed, had taken the cross, intending to join his father in the Kingdom of Jerusalem; instead, he accepted Isaac's offer and returned to Constantinople in the spring of 1187. On his marriage, he was awarded the rank of Caesar. However, almost immediately, he had to help the Emperor defend his throne against a revolt, led by General Alexios Vranas. According to Choniates, Conrad inspired the weak Emperor to take the initiative. He fought without a shield or helmet and wore a linen cuirass instead of mail in the battle in which Vranas was killed. He was slightly wounded in the shoulder, but unhorsed Vranas, who was then killed and beheaded by his bodyguards.

Conrad was vigorous in arms, extremely clever both in natural mental ability and by learning, amiable in character and deed, endowed with all the human virtues, supreme in every council, the fair hope of his own side and a blazing lightning-bolt to the foe, capable of pretence and dissimulation in politics, educated in every language, in respect of which he was regarded by the less articulate to be extremely fluent. — ''Historia brevis occupationis et amissionis Terrae Sanctae'' (Note: A Short History of the Occupation and Loss of the Holy Land)

However, feeling that his service had been insufficiently rewarded, wary of Byzantine anti-Latin sentiment (his youngest brother, Caesar "of Thessalonica" Renier, had been murdered in 1182) and of possible vengeance-seeking by Vranas's family, Conrad set off for the Kingdom of Jerusalem in July 1187 aboard a Genoese merchantman. Some popular modern histories have claimed that he was fleeing vengeance after committing a private murder: this is due to a failure to recognise Vranas's name, garbled into "Lyvernas" in the Old French Continuation of William of Tyre and Roger of Howden's abridgement of his own Gesta regis Henrici Secundi (formerly attributed to Benedict of Peterborough). Roger had initially referred to Conrad as "having slain a prominent nobleman in a rebellion"—meaning Vranas; in his Chronica, he condensed this to "having committed homicide", omitting the context.

== Defense of Tyre ==
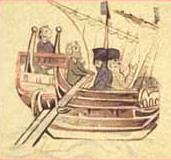
Conrad arrives at Tyre: marginal sketch in late a 12th-century copy of the Brevis Historia Regni Hierosolymitani, a continuation of the Annals of Genoa (Bib. Nat. Française)

Conrad evidently intended to join his father, who held the castle of St Elias. He arrived first off Acre, which had recently fallen to Saladin (Ṣalāḥ ad-Dīn Yūsuf ibn Ayyūb), and so sailed north to Tyre, where he found the remnants of the Crusader army. After his victory at the Battle of Hattin over the army of Jerusalem, Saladin was on the march north, and had already captured Acre, Sidon, and Beirut. Raymond III of Tripoli and his stepsons, Reginald of Sidon and several other leading nobles who had escaped the battle had fled to Tyre, but most were anxious to return to their own territories to defend them. Raymond of Tripoli was in failing health, and died soon after he went home.

According to the Old French Continuation of William of Tyre, Reginald of Sidon had taken charge in Tyre and was in the process of negotiating its surrender with Saladin. Conrad allegedly threw Saladin's banners into the ditch and made the Tyrians swear total loyalty to him. His rise to power seems to have been less dramatic in reality. Reginald went to refortify his own castle of Belfort on the Litani River. With the support of the established Italian merchant communities in the city, Conrad re-organised the defence of Tyre, setting up a commune, similar to those he had so often fought against in Italy.

When Saladin's army arrived they found the city well-defended and defiant. As the chronicler Ibn al-Athir wrote of the man the Arabs came to respect and fear as al-Markis: "He was a devil incarnate in his ability to govern and defend a town, and a man of extraordinary courage". Tyre successfully withstood the siege, and desiring a more profitable conquest, Saladin's army moved on south to Caesarea, Arsuf, and Jaffa. Meanwhile, Conrad sent Joscius, Archbishop of Tyre, to the West in a black-sailed ship, bearing appeals for aid. Arabic writers claimed that he also carried propaganda pictures to use in his preaching, including one of the horses of Saladin's army stabled (and urinating) in the Church of the Holy Sepulchre, and another of a Saracen slapping Christ's face.

In November 1187, Saladin returned for a second siege of Tyre. Conrad was still in command of the city, which was now heavily fortified and filled with Christian refugees from across the north of the Kingdom of Jerusalem. This time Saladin opted for a combined ground and naval assault, setting up a blockade of the harbour. In an incident described by the Itinerarium Peregrinorum (which is generally hostile to Conrad), the Old French Continuation and Sicardus of Cremona's second chronicle (now known through quotations by Salimbene di Adam and Alberto Millioli), Saladin presented Conrad's aged father, William V of Montferrat, who had been captured at Hattin, before the walls of the city. He offered to release William and bestow great gifts upon Conrad if he surrendered Tyre. The old man told his son to stand firm, even when the Egyptians threatened to kill him. Conrad declared that William had lived a long life already, and aimed at him with a crossbow himself. Saladin allegedly said, "This man is an unbeliever and very cruel". But he had succeeded in calling Saladin's bluff: the old Marquis William was released, unharmed, at Tortosa in 1188, and returned to his son.

On 30 December, Conrad's forces launched a dawn raid on the weary Egyptian sailors, capturing many of their galleys. The remaining Egyptian ships tried to escape to Beirut, but the Tyrian ships gave chase, and the Egyptians were forced to beach their ships and flee. Saladin then launched an assault on the landward walls, thinking that the defenders were still distracted by the sea battle. However, Conrad led his men in a charge out of the gates and broke the enemy: Hugh of Tiberias distinguished himself in the battle. Saladin was forced to pull back yet again, burning his siege engines and ships to prevent them from falling into enemy hands.

== Struggle for the crown ==
The Near East, 1190, at the outset of the Third Crusade

In the summer of 1188, Saladin released king Guy of Lusignan, the husband of Queen Sibylla, from captivity. A year later, in 1189, Guy, accompanied by his brother Geoffrey, appeared at Tyre and demanded that Conrad hand over the keys to the city to him. Conrad refused this demand and declared that Guy had forfeited his rights to be king of Jerusalem at the Battle of Hattin in 1187. He said that he was holding the city until the arrival of the kings from Europe. By this, he was invoking the terms of Baldwin IV's will, terms already broken by Guy and Sibylla: in the event of the death of his nephew Baldwin V of Jerusalem it had been Baldwin's will that Baldwin V's "most rightful heirs" were to hold the regency until the succession could be settled by Henry II of England, Philip II of France, and the Holy Roman Emperor Frederick I. Conrad would not allow Guy and Sibylla to enter the city but did allow them to camp outside Tyre's walls with their retainers.

Conrad was persuaded by his cousin-once-removed, Louis III, Landgrave of Thuringia, to join Guy in the Siege of Acre in 1189. The siege lasted for over two years. In the summer of 1190, Conrad travelled north to Antioch to lead another young kinsman, Frederick of Swabia, safely back to Acre with the remnants of his cousin Frederick Barbarossa's imperial army.

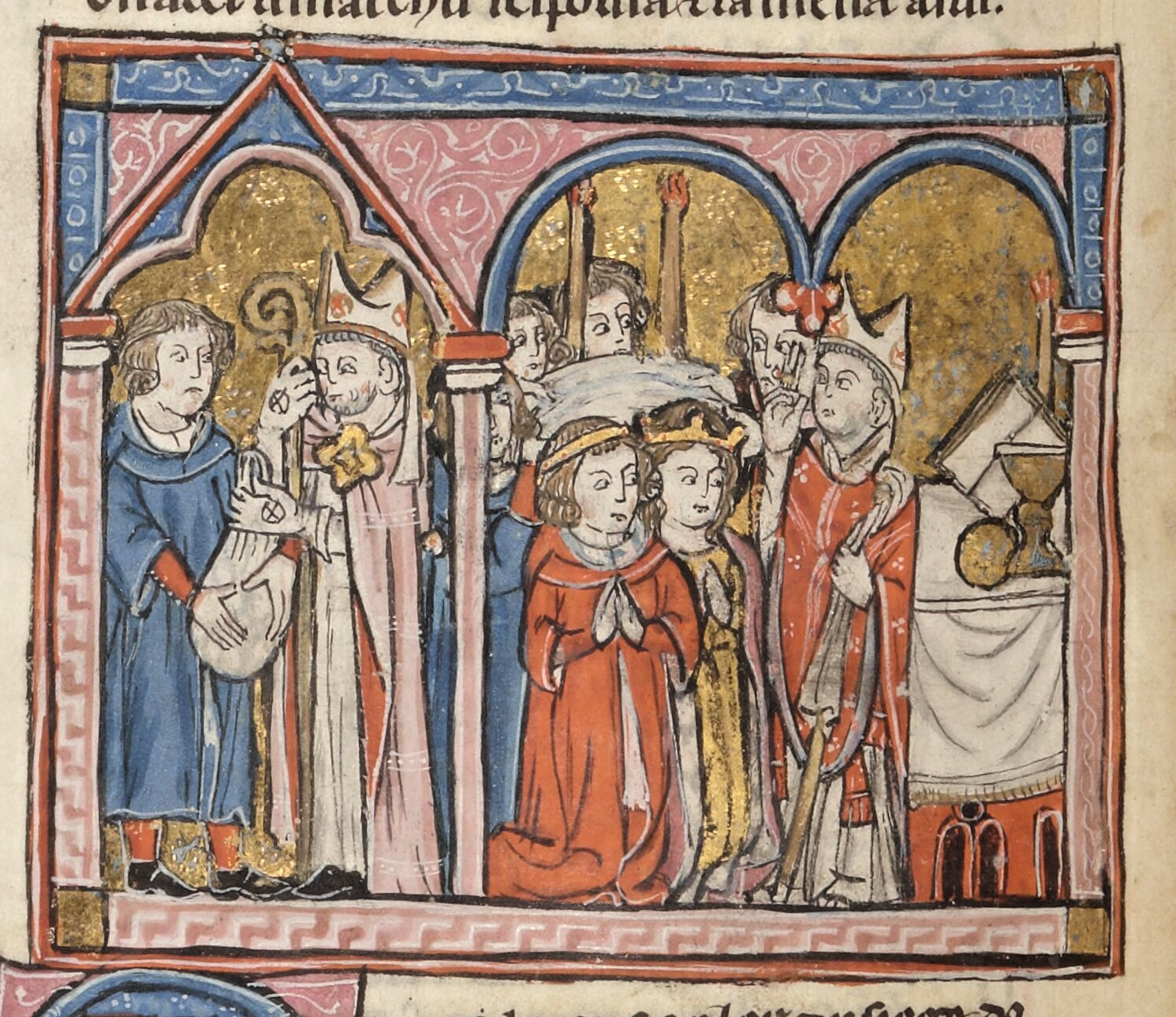
Marriage of Conrad of Montferrat and Isabelle of Jerusalem

When Queen Sibylla and their daughters died of disease later that year, King Guy no longer had a legal claim to the throne—but refused to step aside. The heiress of Jerusalem was Queen Sibylla's half-sister Isabella, who was married to Humphrey IV of Toron, of whom she was fond. However, Conrad had the support of her mother Maria Comnena and stepfather Balian of Ibelin, as well as Reginald of Sidon and other major nobles of Outremer. They obtained an annulment on the grounds that Isabella had been underage at the time of the marriage and had not been able to give consent. Conrad then married Isabella himself, despite rumours of bigamy because of his marriage to Theodora, who was still alive. However, Choniates, who usually expresses strong disapproval of marital/sexual irregularities, makes no mention of this. This may imply that a divorce had been effected from the Byzantine side before 1190, by which time it was obvious that Conrad would not be returning. There were also objections on grounds of canonical incest, since Conrad's brother had previously been married to Isabella's half-sister, and Church law regarded this kind of affinity as equal to a blood relationship. However, the papal legate Ubaldo Lanfranchi, Archbishop of Pisa, gave his approval. Opponents claimed he had been bribed. The marriage, on 24 November 1190, was conducted by Philip of Dreux, Bishop of Beauvais—son of Conrad's cousin Robert I of Dreux. Conrad was now de jure King of Jerusalem. However, he had been wounded in battle only nine days previously and returned with his bride to Tyre to recover. He came back to the siege in spring, making an unsuccessful sea attack against the Tower of Flies at the harbour entrance.

As Guy was a vassal of Richard I, King of England for his lands in Poitou, Richard supported him in this political struggle, while Conrad was supported by his cousin Leopold V of Austria and cousin-once-removed Philip II, King of France. Conrad acted as chief negotiator in the surrender of Acre and raised the kings' banners in the city. Afterwards, the parties attempted to come to an agreement. Guy was confirmed as king of Jerusalem, and Conrad was made his heir. Conrad would retain the cities of Tyre, Beirut, and Sidon, and his heirs would inherit Jerusalem on Guy's death. In July 1191 Conrad's kinsman, King Philip, decided to return to France, but before he left he turned over half the treasure plundered from Acre to Conrad, along with all his prominent Muslim hostages. King Richard asked Conrad to hand over the hostages, but Conrad refused as long as he could. After he finally relented (since Richard was now the leader of the Crusade), Richard had all the hostages killed. Conrad did not join Richard on the campaign to the south, preferring to remain with his wife Isabella in Tyre—believing his life to be in danger. It was probably around this time that Conrad's father died.

During that winter, Conrad opened direct negotiations with Saladin, suspecting that Richard's next move would be to attempt to wrest Tyre from him and restore it to the royal domain for Guy. His primary aim was to be recognised as ruler in the north, while Saladin (who was simultaneously negotiating with Richard for a possible marriage between his brother Al-Adil and Richard's widowed sister Joan, Dowager Queen of Sicily) hoped to separate him from the Crusaders. The situation took a farcical turn when Richard's envoy, Isabella's ex-husband Humphrey of Toron, spotted Conrad's envoy, Reginald of Sidon, out hawking with Al-Adil. There seems to have been no conclusive agreement with Conrad, and Joan refused marriage to a Muslim.

== Assassination ==
In April 1192, the kingship was put to the vote. To Richard's consternation, the barons of the Kingdom of Jerusalem unanimously elected Conrad as King. Richard sold Guy the lordship of Cyprus, where he continued to use a king's title, to compensate him and to deter him from returning to Poitou, where his family had long had a reputation for rebelliousness. Richard's nephew, Henry II of Champagne, brought the news of the election result to Tyre on 24 April and returned to Acre.

However, Conrad was never crowned. Around late morning or noon on 28 April, Isabella, who was pregnant, was late in returning from the hammam to dine with him, and so, "in a celebratory mood", he went to eat at the house of his kinsman and friend, Philip, Bishop of Beauvais. However, "finding that the prelate had already eaten his meal", Conrad

"rode home through the city flanked by a pair of guards. As he turned down a narrow street, he saw two men sitting on either side of the road. As Conrad approached, they stood up and walked to meet him. One of them was holding a letter. Conrad was intrigued but did not dismount. Rather, he stretched down from his horse and reached out to take the letter. As he did so, the man holding the letter drew a knife and stabbed upwards, plunging the blade deep into Conrad's body. At the same time, the other man leaped onto the back of Conrad's horse and stabbed him in the side."

His guards killed one of his attackers and captured the other; both men turned out to be members of the Order of Assassins, a Nizari Isma'ili sect "who had allied with Saladin against the Christians." It is not certain how long Conrad survived. Some sources claimed that he died at the scene of the attack, or in a nearby church within a very short time. Richard's chroniclers claimed that he was taken home, received the last rites, and urged Isabella to give the city over only to Richard or his representative, but this deathbed scene is open to doubt. He was buried in Tyre, in the Church of the Hospitallers. "[T]he Frankish marquis, the ruler of Tyre, and the greatest devil of all the Franks, Conrad of Montferrat—God damn him!—was killed," wrote Ibn al-Athir. Certainly, the loss of a potentially formidable king was a blow to the kingdom.

The murder remains unsolved. Under torture, the surviving Assassin claimed that Richard was behind the killing, but that is impossible to prove. A less likely suspect was Humphrey IV of Toron, Isabella's first husband. Saladin's involvement has also been alleged, as Conrad was in the middle of negotiations with him, but this also seems unlikely, as Saladin himself apparently had no love for the Hashshashin. In 1970, Patrick A. Williams argued a plausible case for Henry of Champagne's guilt, but if so, it is difficult to imagine him taking such a bold step without his uncle Richard's approval.

Later, while returning from the crusade in disguise, King Richard was first recognized by Meinhard II of Görz and then imprisoned by Conrad's cousin, Leopold V of Austria. Conrad's murder was one of the charges against him. Richard requested for the Assassins to vindicate him, and in a letter allegedly from their leader, Rashid al-Din Sinan, they appeared to do so. The letter claimed that in 1191, Conrad had captured an Assassin ship that had sought refuge in Tyre during a storm. He killed the captain, imprisoned the crew, and stripped the ship of its treasure. When Rashid al-Din Sinan requested for the ship's crew and treasure to be returned, he was rebuffed and so a death sentence was issued for Conrad of Montferrat. However, the letter is believed to have been forged. Sinan was already dead, and apart from that letter and the chronicle entries based upon it, there is no other evidence for the Assassins being involved in shipping. The timing of the murder and its consequences (the pregnant Isabella was married off to Henry of Champagne only seven days later, much to the disgust of Muslim commentators) suggest that the chief motive may be sought in Frankish politics.

== Family ==
Conrad's brother Boniface was the leader of the Fourth Crusade and a notable patron of troubadours, as was their sister Azalaïs, Marchioness of Saluzzo. Their youngest brother Renier was a son-in-law of the Byzantine emperor Manuel I Comnenus, and the eldest, William, had been the first husband of Sibylla and father of Baldwin V of Jerusalem. Conrad was also briefly Marquis of Montferrat, following his father's death in 1191. In Montferrat, he was succeeded by Boniface, but his own heiress was (probably) born posthumously: a daughter Maria, 'La Marquise', who in 1205 became Queen of Jerusalem on Isabella's death, but died young in childbirth. Conrad's ex-wife, Theodora, was still living in the mid-late 1190s, when she was having the monastery of Dalmatios converted into a convent, possibly for her own residence.

== Role in fiction, film and art ==
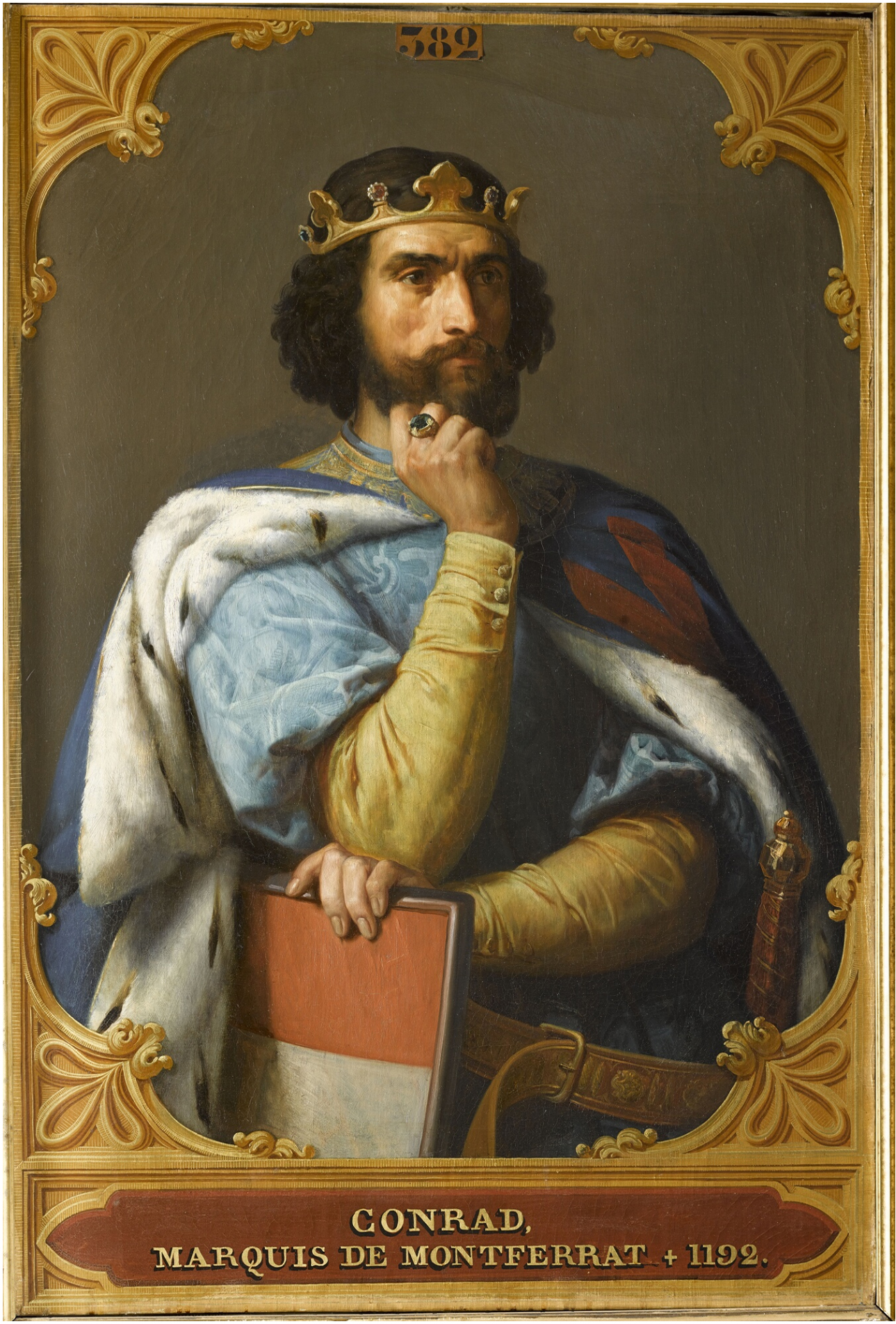
Imaginary portrait of Conrad, c. 1843, by François-Édouard Picot for the Salles des Croisades at Versailles

The Monferrine court was Occitan in its literary culture, and provided patronage to numerous troubadours. Bertran de Born and Peirol mention Conrad in songs composed at the time of the Third Crusade (see external links below). He was seen as a heroic figure, the noble defender of Tyre—the "Marqués valens e pros" ("the valiant and worthy Marquis") as Peirol called him. In Carmina Burana 50: Heu, voce flebili cogor enarrare, he is described as "marchio clarissimus, vere palatinus" ("the most famous Marquis, truly a paladin"). However, subsequently, the long-term prejudice of popular English-language writing towards Richard I and his "Lionheart" myth has adversely affected portrayals of Conrad in English-language fiction and film. Because Richard (and his chroniclers) opposed his claim to the throne, he is generally depicted negatively, even when Richard himself is treated with some scepticism. A rare exception to this is the epic poem Cœur de Lion (1822), by Eleanor Anne Porden, in which he is depicted as a tragic Byronic hero.

An entirely fictionalised, unambiguously wicked version of Conrad appears in Walter Scott's The Talisman, misspelt as 'Conrade of Montserrat' (the novelist apparently misreading 'f' as a long 's' in his sources) and described as a "marmoset" and "popinjay". He is also a villain in Maurice Hewlett's fanciful The Life and Death of Richard Yea-and-Nay (1900). He appears briefly, again in a negative light, in Ronald Welch's Knight Crusader (1954): the description owes much to his portrayal in Cecil B. de Mille's The Crusades, mentioned below. The nadir of his fictional appearances is in Graham Shelby's 1970 novel The Kings of Vain Intent. In this, he is thoroughly demonised—depicted as a sinister figure, physically resembling a vampire; in a chapter added by the author to the U.S. edition, he beats and rapes Isabella. These works reflect the later Renaissance and Gothic novel cultural/ethnic stereotype of the 'Machiavellian' Italian: corrupt, scheming, dandified, not averse to poisoning, even (as in Shelby's novel) sexually sadistic. In contrast, the Russian-born French novelist Zoé Oldenbourg gives him a more positive but fleeting cameo role— proud, strong, and as handsome as Choniates described him—in her 1946 novel Argile et Cendres (Clay and Ashes, published in English as The World Is Not Enough in 1948). He is the hero of Luigi Gabotto's 1968 novel Corrado di Monferrato, which covers his whole career. Another sympathetic portrayal is in Alan Gordon's mystery novel, The Widow of Jerusalem (2003), which investigates his murder.

In film, he has been consistently depicted as a villain, and with scant regard for accuracy. In Cecil B. de Mille's 1935 film The Crusades, he is played by Joseph Schildkraut as a scheming traitor, plotting King Richard's death with Prince John in England at a time when he was actually already defending Tyre. The 1954 film King Richard and the Crusaders, loosely based on The Talisman, similarly depicts him as a villain, played by Michael Pate. Egyptian director Youssef Chahine's 1963 film Al Nasser Salah Ad-Din also shows Scott's influence in its hostility towards Conrad (played by Mahmoud El-Meliguy) and Philip, while depicting Richard more favourably.

On television, he was played by Michael Peake in the 1962 British television series Richard the Lionheart, which derived some of its plotlines loosely from Scott's The Talisman. In the more faithful 1980–1981 BBC serialisation of The Talisman, he was played by Richard Morant.

In painting and drawing, Conrad figures in a small contemporary manuscript sketch of his ship sailing to Tyre in the Annals of Genoa, and various illustrations to Scott's The Talisman. There is an imaginary portrait of him, c. 1843, by François-Édouard Picot for the Salles des Croisades at Versailles: it depicts him as a handsome, rather pensive man in his forties, wearing a coronet and fanciful pseudo-medieval costume. He is shown with dark hair and a beard; it is more likely that, like his father and at least two of his brothers, he was blond.

In the 2007 video game Assassin's Creed, set in 1191 during the height of the Crusades, Conrad's father William V of Montferrat is one of nine Templar targets the main character must assassinate. This is based on the real historical death of Conrad, who was murdered by the Order of Assassins. Conrad himself is referenced in passing by his father and other characters.

== Sources ==
- Brand, Charles M. (1968). Byzantium Confronts the West, 1180–1204. Cambridge, Massachusetts: Harvard University Press. LCCN 67-20872.
- Brevis Historia Occupationis et Amissionis Terræ Sanctæ, in Die Chronik des Propstes Burchard von Ursberg, ed. Oswald Holder-Egger & Bernhard von Simson, Monumenta Germaniæ Historica: Scriptores in Usum Scholarum, (Hannover & Leipzig, 1916), pp. 59–64
- Bolton, Brenda (1 January 2008). "A Matter Of Great Confusion: King Richard I And Syria's Vetus De Monte". Diplomatics in the Eastern Mediterranean 1000-1500. Brill. pp. 171–203. ISBN 978-90-474-3303-3.
- Choniates, Niketas, Historia, ed. J.-L. Van Dieten, 2 vols., Berlin and New York, 1975; trans. as O City of Byzantium, Annals of Niketas Choniates, by H.J. Magoulias, Detroit; Wayne State University Press, 1984, ISBN 0-8143-1764-2
- Edbury, Peter W. (ed.) The Conquest of Jerusalem and the Third Crusade, 1998, ISBN 1-84014-676-1
- Freed, John (2016). Frederick Barbarossa: The Prince and the Myth. Yale University Press.
- Gabrieli, Francesco. (ed.) Arab Historians of the Crusades, English translation 1969, ISBN 0-520-05224-2
- Gilchrist, M. M. "Character-assassination: Conrad de Montferrat in English-language fiction & popular histories", Bollettino del Marchesato. Circolo Culturale I Marchesi del Monferrato, Alessandria, no. 6 (Nov. 2005), pp. 5–13. (external link)
- Gilchrist, M. M. "Getting Away With Murder: Runciman and Conrad of Montferrat’s Career in Constantinople", The Mediæval Journal. St Andrews Institute of Mediæval Studies, vol 2, no. 1 (2012), pp. 15–36, ISBN 978-2-503-54307-9
- Grylicki, Sascha (2017). Conrad von Montferrat – Aufstieg und Fall eines Kreuzfahrerherrschers (PDF) (Thesis) (in German). Ruprecht-Karls-Universität Heidelberg.
- Haberstumpf, Walter. Dinastie europee nel Mediterraneo orientale. I Monferrato e i Savoia nei secoli XII–XV, 1995 (external link to downloadable text).
- Hamilton, Bernard (2000). The Leper King and His Heirs: Baldwin IV and the Crusader Kingdom of Jerusalem. Cambridge University Press. ISBN 9780521017473.
- Ilgen, Theodor. Konrad, Markgraf von Montferrat, 1880
- Nicholson, Helen J. (ed.) The Chronicle of the Third Crusade: The Itinerarium Peregrinorum et Gesta Regis Ricardi, 1997, ISBN 0-7546-0581-7
- Nicholson, Helen J. (2022). Sybil, Queen of Jerusalem, 1186–1190. Routledge & CRC Press.
- "CORRADO, marchese di Monferrato - Enciclopedia". Treccani (in Italian).
- Runciman, Steven. A History of the Crusades, 1951–54, vols. 2–3.
- Usseglio, Leopoldo. I Marchesi di Monferrato in Italia ed in Oriente durante i secoli XII e XIII, 1926.
- William of Tyre, French continuation of. Historia rerum in partibus transmarinis gestarum (external link to text in medieval French).
- Williams, Patrick A. "The Assassination of Conrad of Montferrat: Another Suspect?", Traditio, vol. XXVI, 1970.

Conrad of Montferrat Aleramici dynasty Born: mid 1140s Died: 28 April 1192
Regnal titles
Preceded by William V	Marquis of Montferrat; 1191–1192	Succeeded by Boniface I
Preceded by Guy	King of Jerusalem; 1192 with Isabella I	Succeeded by Isabella I as sole ruler
