= Judith of Babenberg =

Margravine of Montferrat

- Marchioness of Montferrat
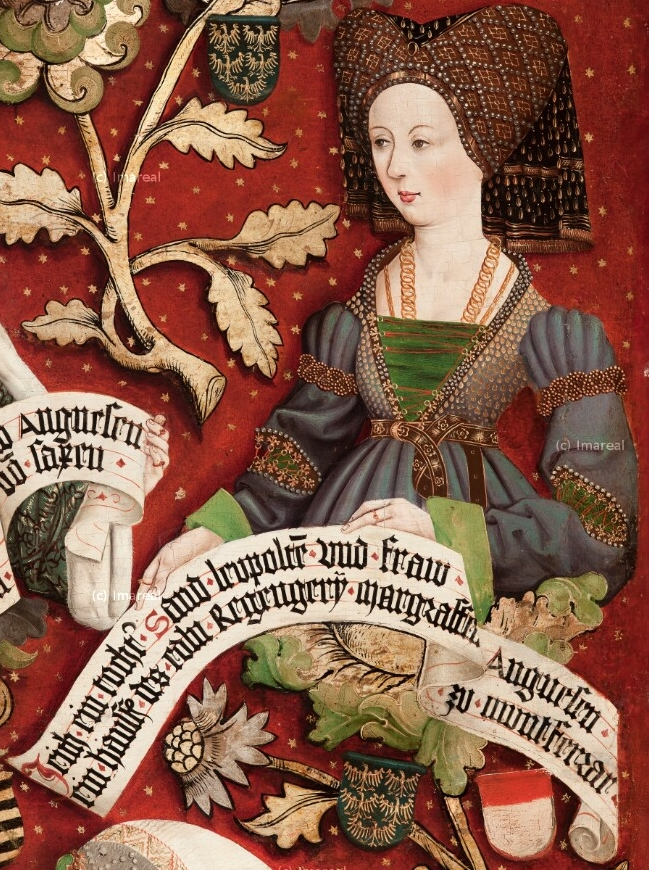
- An imaginary portrait of Judith of Babenberg, painted by Hans Part in 1490, as part of the Genealogy of the Babenberg Ladies at Klosterneuburg Abbey, founded by her parents. The inscription misnames her husband as "Renier".
- Born: c. late 1110s/1120 Austria
- Died: After 1168; Montferrat
- Noble family: House of Babenberg
- Spouse: William V of Montferrat
- Issue: William, Count of Jaffa and Ascalon; Conrad I, King of Jerusalem; Boniface I, King of Thessalonica; Frederick, Bishop of Alba; Renier, Caesar of the Byzantine Empire; Agnes, Countess of Modigliana; Azalaïs, Marchioness of Saluzzo
- Father: Leopold III, Margrave of Austria
- Mother: Agnes of Germany

Judith (called Julitta in Latin, Giuditta in Italian; c. 1120 – 1191?) was a German noblewoman who was the marchioness of Montferrat by marriage from 1133 until her death. She was a member of the House of Babenberg through her father and related to the House of Hohenstaufen through her mother.

With her husband, Marquis William V, she had five sons and three daughters. Four of her sons played major roles in Mediterranean politics. In the later Middle Ages, she was remembered for her piety and beauty.

== Life ==
Judith was born around 1120. She was a daughter of Margrave Leopold III of Austria (1073–1136) and his second wife, Agnes (1072–1143). Through her mother she was the uterine sister of King Conrad III of Germany and the aunt of Emperor Frederick Barbarossa. She was the full sister of the historian Otto of Freising.

Sometime before 28 March 1133, Judith married the Marquis William V of Montferrat. The Aleramici were among the leading dynasties in the Crusades; William accompanied his nephew King Louis VII of France on the Second Crusade of 1147.

Judith's usual title was countess. She appears as such when witnessing donations to the monasteries of Lucedio (1145) and Grassano (1156). On 18 October 1168, she bought some land in Montebello. She was also mentioned in the treaties with the communes of Asti (1170×1174) and Alessandria (1178), which stipulated that she or her sons could stand in for William.

In the early 1180s, according to later historians Galeotto del Carretto and Benvenuto Sangiorgio, Judith travelled to the Holy Land to visit her grandson, the future King Baldwin V of Jerusalem, and thence to Constantinople to visit her son, Renier. Renier and his wife, Maria Komnene, gave her many relics, including some wood from the True Cross, which she gave to Lucedio after her return in 1183. This story, found only in accounts by later historians, is inconsistent in detail. While Leopoldo Usseglio considers the basic fact of such a journey difficult to doubt, Walter Habserstumpf regards it as a legendary backstory for a relic.

== Death and legacy ==
The necrology of Lucedio records Judith's death as occurring on 14 December without specifying the year. According to Sangiorgio, she died around 1183, not long after returning from Constantinople. He also says that she died not long after her husband, who is known to have died in 1191. Olimpio Musso thus places her death on 14 December 1191.

In later legend, Judith was renowned for her virtue and beauty. Guglielmo Catanio da Lu, writing at the same time as Galeotto, declared Judith to have been "worthy of the government of the imperial seat", where her son Renier was caesar. According to Musso, she was "the most celebrated marchioness of Montferrat". Musso posits the reputation of her beauty and virtue as partial inspiration for the figure of the marchioness of Montferrat in Boccaccio's Decameron, day 1, tale 5. She was the marchioness when Philip Augustus went on crusade, but by then she was over 70 years old. Boccaccio's tale of Philip's falling in love with her is fiction.

== Marriage and issue ==
Judith and William had eight children together:

- William Longsword (d. 1177), Count of Jaffa and Ascalon; father of Baldwin V of Jerusalem
- Conrad (d. 1192), King of Jerusalem
- Boniface I (d. 1207), his successor to Montferrat and founder of the Kingdom of Thessalonica.
- Frederick, Bishop of Alba
- Renier (d. 1183), married into the Byzantine imperial family.
- Agnes (1202); married Count Guido Guerra III of Modigliana. The marriage was annulled on grounds of childlessness before 1180, when Guido remarried, and Agnes entered the convent of Santa Maria di Rocca delle Donne.
- Adelasia (Azalaïs) (d. 1232); married Manfred II, Marquess of Saluzzo, c. 1182, and was regent for her grandson, Manfred III.
- An unidentified daughter, who married Albert, Marquess of Malaspina.

== Sources ==
- Bicchierai, Marco (2003). "Guidi, Tegrimo". Dizionario Biografico degli Italiani (in Italian). Vol. 61: Guglielmo Gonzaga–Jacobini. Rome: Istituto dell'Enciclopedia Italiana. ISBN 978-88-12-00032-6.
- Della Terza, Dante (2004). "The Tale of the Marchioness of Monferrato (I.5)". In Elissa B. Weaver (ed.). The Decameron First Day in Perspective. University of Toronto Press. p. 135–147.
- Freed, John (2016). Frederick Barbarossa: The Prince and the Myth. Yale University Press.
- Haberstumpf, Walter (1995). Dinastie europee nel Mediterraneo orientale: I Monferrato ei Savoia nei secoli XII–XV. Scriptorium.
- Kosi, Miha (2021). "The Babenberg Dukes of Austria - crusaders "par excellence"". In Bronstein, Judith; Fishhof, Gil; Shotten-Hallel, Vardit (eds.). Settlement and Crusade in the Thirteenth Century: Multidisciplinary Studies of the Latin East. Routledge. pp. 270–284.
- McDougall, Sara (2017). Royal Bastards: The Birth of Illegitimacy, 800-1230. Oxford University Press.
- Musso, Olimpio (1979). "Una leggenda monferrina nel Boccaccio (Decam. I, 5)". Studi sul Boccaccio Venezia. 11: 243–249.
- Otto of Freising; Rahewin (1966). Charles Christopher Mierow (ed.). The Deeds of Frederick Barbarossa. New York: W. W. Norton.
- Piano, Pierluigi (2013). "Giovanni Boccaccio, l'arguzia della marchesa di Monferrato e la novella 5a della 1a Giornata del Decameron" (PDF). Bollettino del Marchesato. 9 (51): 4–8.
- Riley-Smith, Jonathan (1992). "Family traditions and Participation in the Second Crusade". In Gervers, M. (ed.). The Second Crusade and the Cistercians. Palgrave Macmillan. pp. 101–108.
- Salmons, June (1980). "Italian Studies: Duecento and Trecento II (Excluding Dante)". The Year's Work in Modern Language Studies. 42: 451–468. JSTOR 20867511.
- Settia, Aldo (2003). "Guglielmo V, detto il Vecchio, marchese di Monferrato". Dizionario Biografico degli Italiani (in Italian). Vol. 60: Grosso–Guglielmo da Forli. Rome: Istituto dell'Enciclopedia Italiana. ISBN 978-88-12-00032-6.
- Theotokis, George (2019). Twenty Battles That Shaped Medieval Europe. Crowood.
- Usseglio, Leopoldo (1926). I marchesi di Monferrato in Italia ed in oriente durante i secoli XII e XIII. Vol. 1. Casale Monferrato.
