= William V of Montferrat =

Italian noble (c. 1115 – 1191)

William V

Marquis of Montferrat
- Reign: 1135–1191
- Predecessor: Rainier
- Successor: Conrad
- Born: 1115
- Died: 1191 (aged 75–76); Tyre, Lebanon
- Noble family: Aleramici
- Spouse: Judith of Babenberg
- Issue: William, Count of Jaffa and Ascalon; Conrad I, King of Jerusalem; Boniface I, King of Thessalonica; Frederick, Bishop of Alba; Renier, Caesar of the Byzantine Empire; Agnes, Countess of Modigliana; Azalaïs, Marchioness of Saluzzo
- Father: Renier I of Montferrat
- Mother: Gisela of Burgundy

William V of Montferrat (occ./piem. Guilhem, it. Guglielmo) (c. 1115 – 1191) also known regnally as William III of Montferrat while also referred to as William the Old or William the Elder, in order to distinguish him from his eldest son, William Longsword, was seventh Marquis of Montferrat from 1135 to his death in 1191. William was the only son of Marquis Renier I and his wife Gisela, a daughter of Count William I of Burgundy and widow of Count Humbert II of Savoy. It seems likely, given that he was still fit enough to participate in battle in 1187, that William was one of his parents' youngest children.

He was described by Acerbo Morena as of medium height and compact build, with a round, somewhat ruddy face and hair so fair as to be almost white. He was eloquent, intelligent and good-humoured, generous but not extravagant. Dynastically, he was extremely well connected: a nephew of Pope Callixtus II, a half-brother of Amadeus III of Savoy whose daughter, Matilda, was married to King Afonso I of Portugal, a brother-in-law of Louis VI of France (through his half-sister Adelaide of Maurienne), a cousin of Alfonso VII of Castile, and his maternal great-grandmother was Alice of Normandy which made him a distant relative to the Norman monarchs of England.

== Dynastic marriage ==
William married Judith (or Ita) of Babenberg, daughter of Leopold III of Austria and Agnes of Germany, sometime before March 28, 1133. Their sons were prominent in the affairs of the Kingdom of Jerusalem and of Byzantium:

- William Longsword, Count of Jaffa and Ascalon, father of Baldwin V of Jerusalem
- Conrad, King of Jerusalem
- Boniface, his successor to Montferrat and founder of the Kingdom of Thessalonica
- Frederick, who entered the Church and became Bishop of Alba (dates uncertain).
- Renier, married into the Byzantine imperial family

and three daughters:

- Agnes, who married Count Guido Guerra III Guidi conte di Modigliana. The marriage was annulled on grounds of childlessness before 1180, when Guido remarried, and Agnes entered the convent of Santa Maria di Rocca delle Donne.
- Adelasia, or Azalaïs (d. 1232), who married Manfred II, Marquis of Saluzzo, c. 1182, and was regent for her grandson Manfred III.
- An unidentified daughter, who married Albert, Marquis of Malaspina.

The vida of the troubadour Raimbaut de Vaqueiras claims that there was another daughter, Beatrice, who m. Henry I del Carretto, Marquis of Savona, and that she is the Bel Cavalher (Fair Knight) of Vaqueiras's songs. However, the lyrics of Vaqueiras's songs (as opposed to the later vida) describe Beatrice as Boniface's daughter, and thus William's granddaughter.

Otto of Tonengo (d. 1251), who became Bishop of Porto, and Cardinal in 1227, has sometimes been identified as a son of William V, and confused with Frederick. However, his dates make it more likely that he was a son of William VI of Montferrat, whether legitimate or not is uncertain.

William and Judith's powerful dynastic connections created difficulties in finding suitable wives for his sons, and too many potential spouses were related within prohibited degrees. In 1167, he unsuccessfully tried to negotiate marriages for his eldest sons to daughters of Henry II, King of England—but the girls were very young at the time and were related through Judith's descent from William V of Aquitaine. He then applied for sisters of William I, King of Scotland, who were not related, but were already married.

== Alliances with the Western and Eastern Empires ==
William took part in the Second Crusade, alongside his half-brother Amadeus of Savoy (who died during the campaign), his nephew Louis VII of France, his brother-in-law Count Guido of Biandrate, and his wife's German and Austrian relatives.

As supporters of the imperial party (later known as the Ghibellines), he and his sons fought with the Emperor Frederick Barbarossa (Judith's nephew) in his lengthy struggle against the Lombard League. Following Barbarossa's capitulation with the Peace of Venice in 1177, William was left to deal with the rebellious towns in the area alone. Meanwhile, the Byzantine emperor Manuel I Komnenos sought support for his own politics in Italy.

William broke with Barbarossa and formed an alliance with Manuel. His eldest surviving son, Conrad, was taken prisoner by Barbarossa's chancellor, Archbishop Christian of Mainz, but then captured the chancellor in battle at Camerino. In 1179 Manuel suggested a marriage between his daughter Maria, second in line to the throne, and one of William's sons. As Conrad and Boniface were already married, the youngest son, Renier, was married off to the princess, who was ten years his senior. Renier and Maria were later killed during the usurpation of Andronikos, and the family rebuilt ties with Barbarossa.

== Crusade in Outremer ==
In 1183, with the accession of his grandson Baldwin V, a minor, as co-king of Jerusalem, William, then probably in his late sixties, left the government of Montferrat to Conrad and Boniface, and returned to the east. He was granted the castle of St. Elias (present-day Taybeh). He fought in the Battle of Hattin in 1187, where he was captured by Saladin's forces. In the meantime, his second son, Conrad, had arrived at Tyre from Constantinople. Conrad was given the command of the defences. During the siege of Tyre in November that year, he is said to have refused to surrender as much as a stone of its walls to liberate his father, even threatening to shoot him with a crossbow himself when Saladin had him presented as a hostage. Eventually, Saladin withdrew his army from Tyre. In 1188, William was released unharmed at Tortosa, and seems to have ended his days in Tyre, with his son. He probably died in the summer of 1191: Conrad last describes himself as "marchionis Montisferrati filius" in a charter of May that year.

== Popular culture ==
William of Montferrat is an assassination target in the video game Assassin's Creed (2007), set during the Third Crusade in 1191. In the game, William is Liege Lord of Acre under King Richard I and is portrayed as middle-aged rather than in his late seventies. Unbeknownst to Richard, William is also a member of the Templar Order with secret instructions to prepare the people of Acre for the Templars' vision of the "New World". He does this by hoarding food and forcefully conscripting soldiers to teach them hardship and discipline, making him a target of the Assassins. William's assassination in the game is inspired by the real-life death of his son Conrad, who was also killed by the Assassins.

== Sources ==
- Beihammer, Alexander D.; Parani, Maria G.; Schabel, Christopher D., eds. (2008). Diplomatics in the Eastern Mediterranean 1000-1500: Aspects of Cross-Cultural Communication. BRILL. ISBN 978-9047433033.
- Berman, Constance Hoffman (2018). The White Nuns: Cistercian Abbeys for Women in Medieval France. University of Pennsylvania Press.
- Hamilton, Bernard (2000). The Leper King and His Heirs: Baldwin IV and the Crusader Kingdom of Jerusalem. Cambridge University Press.
- Kosi, Miha (2021). "The Babenberg Dukes of Austria crusaders - "par excellence"". In Bronstein, Judith; Fishhof, Gil; Shotten-Hallel, Vardit (eds.). Settlement and Crusade in the Thirteenth Century: Multidisciplinary Studies of the Latin East. Routledge.
- Haberstumpf, Walter. Dinastie europee nel Mediterraneo orientale. I Monferrato e i Savoia nei secoli XII–XV, 1995 (external link to downloadable text).
- Settia, Aldo A. "Guglielmo V di Monferrato, detto il Vecchio", Dizionario Biografico degli Italiani, vol. LX, Roma 2003 (external link)
- Usseglio, Leopoldo. I Marchesi di Monferrato in Italia ed in Oriente durante i secoli XII e XIII, 1926.

Preceded by Rainier	Marquis of Montferrat c. 1136 – 1191	Succeeded by Conrad
