= Rainier, Marquis of Montferrat =

Rainier or Renier (Italian: Ranieri; c. 1084 – May 1135), son of William IV, Marquis of Montferrat, was the sixth ruler of the state of Montferrat in north-west Italy from about 1100 to his death, and the first such to be identified in contemporary documents as Margrave of Montferrat.

== Life ==
Renier was a powerful lord in his own time, appearing extensively in the contemporary documentation. With him the Aleramici of Montferrat first begin to throw off the shroud of obscurity and demonstrate a degree of influence in Italian politics. The beginning of his reign, nevertheless, is not clearly known, as he first appears in a document of 23 March 1111 as Raynerius de Monteferrato marchio. He appears with this same title years later in 1126 and 1133 when, with other members of his family, he founded the Cistercian monastery of Santa Maria di Lucedio near Trino.

Around the time of his appearance in the pages of history, c. 1111, Renier was a follower of the Emperor Henry V. In that year he obtained an imperial concession for the citizens of Turin: a diploma regarding the Via Francigena which passed through the town. Also that year, with his cousin Oberto I of Occimiano, he donated to the Chapter of Saint Evasius of Casale the church of San Martino di Zenzano infra castrum Aucimianum (in the castle of Occimiano). That this act took place in Occimiano testifies to the importance of that locality, which had in the past been the seat of kings.

In 1113, Renier donated his portion of the Langiano to the monastery of San Secondo di Terra Rossa, affiliated with the Abbey of Fruttuaria. On 23 May 1116, Renier was present with the Emperor when the latter bestowed the castles of Celle, Frassinello, Fubine, and Cuccaro on his nephew Conrad and Guido Cane.

== Family ==
In 1105, Renier married Gisela, daughter of William I, Count of Burgundy, already the widow of Humbert II of Savoy and mother of Adelaide of Maurienne, who, in 1115, became the second queen of Louis VI of France. Renier and Gisela had:

- William V, who succeeded to the march.
- Joanna, who married William Clito, Count of Flanders, in 1127, and was widowed a year later
- Matilda, who married Alberto Zueta, Margrave of Parodi
- Adelasia, who became a nun
- one possibly named Isabella, who married Guido, Count of Biandrate (although it is possible that this may be a second marriage of Joanna)

== Sources ==
- Bolton, Brenda (2008). "A Matter of Great Confusion: King Richard I and Syria's Vetus de Monte". In Beihammer, Alexander Daniel; Parani, Maria G.; Schabel, Christopher David (eds.). Diplomatics in the Eastern Mediterranean 1000-1500: Aspects of Cross. Brill.
- Hamilton, Bernard (2000). The Leper King and His Heirs: Baldwin IV and the Crusader Kingdom of Jerusalem. Cambridge University Press.
- Swanton, Michael, ed. (1998). The Anglo-Saxon Chronicle. Routledge.
- Usseglio, Leopoldo. I Marchesi di Monferrato in Italia ed in Oriente durante i secoli XII e XIII. 1926.
- ‘Ranieri’, freely adapted by Roberto Maestri from Aldo di Ricaldone, Annali del Monferrato (951–1708), and published online by the circolo culturale I Marchesi del Monferrato.

Preceded by William IV	Margrave of Montferrat c. 1100–1135	Succeeded by William V
