= Peire Bremon lo Tort =

French troubadour

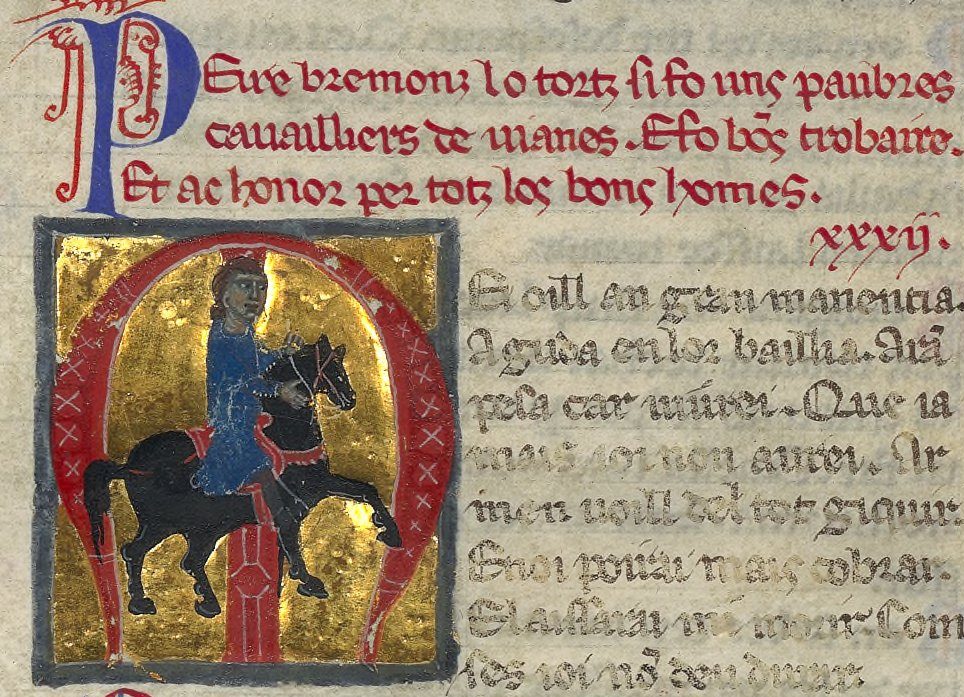
Peire depicted as a "poor knight" (paubres cavaillers)

Peire Bremon lo Tort (or Bremonz lo Tortz) (fl. 1177) was a troubadour from the Viennois. Though only two of his pieces (both love songs) survive, his poetry is characterised by Francoprovençalisms. According to his short vida, he was "honoured by all the notable men."

Peire Bremon has been identified with the Petrus Bermudi and Peire Bremont found in documents of 1160 pertaining to the Dauphiné. He is possibly the same person as the Peire Bremon related to the counts of Toulouse in a stanza of Peire d'Alvernhe's satire of contemporary troubadours. "Peire Bremon" was not a rare name and it was shared by the later troubadour, sometimes erroneously identified with lo Tort (whose nickname means "the Wrong"), Peire Bremon Ricas Novas.

Peire's earlier poem, Mei oill an gran manentia, was written as the troubadour prepared to depart from Syria, where he had been staying. He left behind a beloved domna (lady), whom he celebrated in the poem En abril, quant vei verdejar upon his arrival in the Orient. It was addressed, however, not to his lady herself, but to Guillelm Longa-Espia, that is, William of Montferrat, count of Jaffa and Ascalon. The poem contains the earliest mention of William by his famous nickname, "Longsword". The date of the poem can be set by the dates when William was known to be in the Holy Land: October 1176 – July 1177.

Chanzos, tu.t n'iras outra mar,
e, per Deu, vai a midons dir
qu'en gran dolor et en cossir
me fai la nuoit e.l jorn estar.
di.m a'n Guilhelm Longa-Espia,
bona chanzos, qu'el li.t dia
e que i an per lieis confortar.

Peire claims in the second tornada of this poem to have written it while in the service of Filippe de Monreal, who is probably Philip of Milly, a crusader baron known to have held the castle of Montréal for a time.

== Sources ==
- Egan, Margarita, ed. The Vidas of the Troubadours. New York: Garland, 1984. ISBN 0-8240-9437-9.
- Riquer, Martín de. Los trovadores: historia literaria y textos. 3 vol. Barcelona: Planeta, 1975.
