= Alan Gordon (author) =

American novelist

Alan R. Gordon (born June 23, 1969) is an American author of several historical mysteries, the first of which is based on the characters from William Shakespeare's Twelfth Night. He lives in New York City and is a lawyer with the Legal Aid Society.

Gordon has also written the libretto for several musicals, including "The Girl Detective" and "The Usual." He won the 2013 Kleban Prize for Most Promising Musical Theatre Librettist for "The Usual."

A graduate of Swarthmore College and the University of Chicago Law School, he is married to Judy Downer, with whom he has a son, Robert.

== Bibliography ==
Fools' Guild Mysteries series:

- Thirteenth Night (1999). Set a decade after the events of Twelfth Night, Feste returns to investigate the murder of the Duke of Orsino.
- Jester Leaps In (2000). Theophilos (a.k.a. Feste), along with his new apprentice Viola, has been sent by the Fool's Guild to investigate the disappearance of some agents in Constantinople.
- A Death In The Venetian Quarter (2002). Theophilos and Viola (now a fool, and going under the name Claudia) are investigating the death of Bastiani, a silk merchant and informant.
- The Widow Of Jerusalem (2003) is set in Tyre during the Third Crusade, and is set as a story being told in 1204 of events that took place prior to the events recounted in the first three books. Theophilos is trying to broker peace between the various participants. It is based on actual events involving Isabella of Jerusalem and her husband Conrad of Montferrat.
- An Antic Disposition (2004) is based on Hamlet. While hiding from Papal troops, the fools give their take on a decades-old tragedy in Denmark.
- The Lark's Lament (2007), in which Theophilos is sent to persuade Abbot Folquet, a former troubadour turned monk, to help the Fools' Guild. Whilst Theo is there, a monk is killed and a threatening message left on the monastery walls.
- The Moneylender of Toulouse (2008). Theophilos is sent to Toulouse to convince the current bishop to retire, to be replaced by one more amenable to the Fool's Guild (Abbot Folquet, seen in the previous book). A moneylender who had argued with the bishop is found dead.
- The Parisian Prodigal (2010). In May 1205, a man arrives in Toulouse purporting to be the full brother of local ruler Count Raimon VI. Shortly thereafter, he is found in bed next to a dead whore.

Short Stories:

- Fresh Meat (2008), as part of the Wolfsbane and Mistletoe anthology; Sam Lehrmann trains exceptional guard dogs, and he also has a secret that he's being hunted for on Christmas Eve.
