= Amadeus II of Savoy =

Count of Savoy (1078-1080)

Amadeus II (c. 1050 – 26 January 1080) was the count of Savoy from 1078 to 1080. His life is obscure, and few documents mention him. During his rule, he was overshadowed by his mother, but he had good relations with the papacy and, for a time, the Holy Roman emperor.

== Before his countship ==
The second son of Count Otto of Savoy and Margravine Adelaide of Turin, Amadeus II was probably born around 1050, because he, alongside other noblemen of the Kingdom of Burgundy, swore an oath on the tomb of Saint Peter in Rome to defend the Church around 1070–73. In 1074 Pope Gregory VII was trying to persuade William I, Count of Burgundy, to remember this vow and, with Amadeus and others, go to the defence of the Roman Empire in the East against the Seljuk Turks. As his mother is known to have had good relations with the Papacy in these years, this record seems to indicate that Amadeus was following his mother's policies at this early stage in his career.

Early in 1077, Amadeus, with his mother and brother Peter, then Count of Savoy, hosted his sister Bertha, and his brother-in-law, Bertha's husband, the Emperor Henry IV. Amadeus and Adelaide then escorted the imperial couple to Canossa so the excommunicated emperor could reconcile with the pope. There they both took part in the negotiations and stood as pledges for the emperor's good faith.

On 16 July 1078, Amadeus and Peter witnessed a donation of their mother's to the Abbey of Novalesa. It was the last act of Amadeus and Peter together.

== As count ==
On 9 August 1078, Peter died and Amadeus succeeded him as Count of Savoy, but in the March of Turin, where Peter had co-ruled with their mother, Amadeus was never margrave, although the reason for this is unclear. One document, issued by his widowed daughter Adelaide in 1090, refers to him as "count and margrave" (comes et marchio), but it is probably anachronistic. There is only one document from his reign, in the cartulary of Saint-André-le-Bas in Vienne, which is dated when "Count Amadeus [was] reigning." This shows, by the absence of the regnal year of the emperor, that despite his involvement in the reconciliation at Canossa, Amadeus II was neutral in the wider Investiture Controversy and the wars against Henry IV that it caused in Germany.

Amadeus died in Turin on 26 January 1080, according to the necrology of the church of Saint Andrew there. This date must be at least approximately correct, since Adelaide made a monastic donation for the benefit of the souls of her sons, Margrave Peter and Count Amadeus, on 8 March.

== Marriage, children and succession ==
According to the much later Chronicles of Savoy, Amadeus married Joan, daughter of "Girard, Count of Burgundy", who scholars have surmised to have been Count Gerold of Geneva. The Chronicon Altacumbae says only that "the wife of Amadeus [was] from Burgundy", which might refer to Amadeus I. If his wife were Genevan, it would explain how the house of Savoy came to possess so early a large portion of the Genevois. His wife, whatever her name and origins, bore Amadeus II several children, although there is some uncertainty about how many. His confirmed children were:

- Adelaide, wife of Manasses II, sire de Coligny
- Ausilia (also Auxilia or Usilia), second wife of Humbert II de Beaujeu, whom she bore four sons by the last decade of the eleventh century: Guichard, Humbert, Guigues, and Hugh
- Humbert II, his successor as count of Savoy
- Constance of Savoy, wife of Otto II of Montferrat.

The succession of Amadeus II is unclear. His son Humbert II, who was later Count of Savoy, is well known, but in 1082 the Count of Savoy was Otto II. Although Amadeus is known to have had a younger brother named Otto, he is more likely to have been the Bishop of Asti of this name and time. This has led some scholars, beginning with the Conte di Vesme, to make Otto II the eldest son of Amadeus II, who succeeded him and was in turn succeeded by Humbert II. In the immediate aftermath of Amadeus's death, Adelaide took control of all the Savoyard lands on both sides of the Alps.

Amadeus II House of Savoy Born: c. 1050 Died: 28 January 1080
Regnal titles
Preceded by Peter I	Count of Savoy; 1078–1080	Succeeded by Humbert II
