= Joan of Geneva =

Countess Consort of Savoy

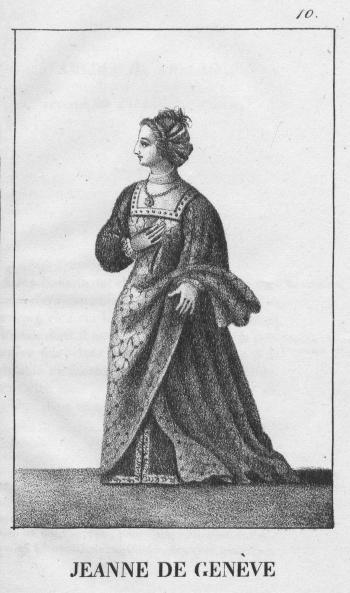
Joan of Geneva

Joan of Geneva (born c. 1040; died 1095) was a Countess Consort of Savoy; married to Amadeus II, Count of Savoy.

According to the much later Chronicles of Savoy, Amadeus married Joan, daughter of "Girard, Count of Burgundy", which scholars have surmised to have been Count Gerold of Geneva. The Chronicon Altacumbae says only that "the wife of Amadeus [was] from Burgundy", which might refer to Amadeus I. If his wife were Genevan, it would explain how the house of Savoy came so early to possess a large portion of the Genevois. His wife, whatever her name and origins, bore Amadeus II several children, although there is some uncertainty about how many:

- Adelaide, wife of Manasses, sire de Coligny
- Ausilia (also Auxilia or Usilia), second wife of Humbert II de Beaujeu, whom she bore four sons by the last decade of the eleventh century: Guichard, Humbert, Guigues, and Hugh

Preceded by Agnes of Aquitaine	Countess of Savoy; 1078–1080	Succeeded by Gisela of Burgundy
