= Gisela of Burgundy, Marchioness of Montferrat =

Countess of Savoy, Marchioness of Montferrat (1075–1135)

Gisela
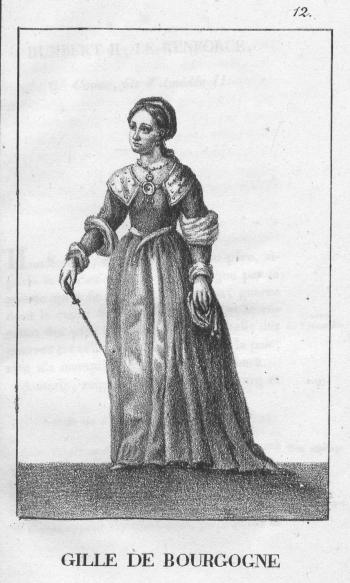
- Born: 1075
- Died: May 1135 (aged 59–60)
- Spouses: Humbert II, Count of Savoy; Rainier, Marquess of Montferrat
- Issue: With Humbert; Amadeus III, Count of Savoy; William, Bishop of Liège; Adelaide of Maurienne; Agnes; Humbert; Reginald; With Rainier; Joanna; William V, Marquis of Montferrat; Matilda; Adelasia; Isabella
- Father: William I, Count of Burgundy
- Mother: Stephanie

Gisela of Burgundy (1075–1135) was a Countess consort of Savoy and a Marchioness consort of Montferrat. Gisela was the wife of Humbert II, Count of Savoy and later of Rainier of Montferrat whom she married after Humbert's death. Gisela was the daughter of William I, Count of Burgundy and his consort Stephanie.

Gisela married Humbert II, Count of Savoy. They had:

- Amadeus III, Count of Savoy
- William, Bishop of Liège
- Adelaide of Maurienne (d. 1154), wife of King Louis VI of France
- Agnes—wife of Arcimboldo VI, lord of Bourbon
- Humbert
- Reginald

Gisela married Rainier, Marquis of Montferrat. They had:

- Joanna, who married William Clito, Count of Flanders, in 1127, and was widowed a year later
- William V, Marquis of Montferrat
- Matilda, wife of Alberto of Parodi, Margrave of Parodi
- Adelasia—a nun
- Isabella—wife of Guido, Count of Biandrate

== Sources ==
- Beihammer, Alexander D.; Parani, Maria G.; Schabel, Christopher D., eds. (2008). Diplomatics in the Eastern Mediterranean 1000-1500: Aspects of Cross-Cultural Communication. BRILL. ISBN 978-9047433033.
- Commire, Anne, ed. (2000). Women in World History. Vol. Jab–Kyt. Yorkin Publications.
- Hamilton, Bernard (2000). The Leper King and His Heirs: Baldwin IV and the Crusader Kingdom of Jerusalem. Cambridge University Press.
- Previte-Orton, C.W. (1912). The Early History of the House of Savoy: 1000-1233. Cambridge University Press.

| Preceded by Joan of Geneva | Countess of Savoy; 1090–1103 | Succeeded by Adelaide, Countess consort of Savoy |
