= Humbert II of Savoy =

Count of Savoy from 1080 to 1103

Humbert II

Count of Savoy
- Reign: c. 1080–1103
- Predecessor: Amadeus II
- Successor: Amadeus III
- Born: c. 1065
- Died: 19 October 1103
- Noble family: Savoy
- Spouse: Gisela of Burgundy
- Issue: Amadeus III of Savoy; William; Adelaide, Queen of France; Agnes; Umberto; Reginald; Guy
- Father: Amadeus II of Savoy
- Mother: Joan of Geneva

Humbert II (Italian: Umberto II), nicknamed the Fat (c. 1065 – 19 October 1103), was Count of Savoy from 1080 until his death in 1103. He was the son of Amadeus II of Savoy.

He was married to Gisela of Burgundy, daughter of William I, Count of Burgundy, and had seven children:

- Amadeus III of Savoy (1095–1148)
- William, Bishop of Liège
- Adelaide, (d. 1154), married to Louis VI of France
- Agnes, (d. 1127), married to Archimbald VI, lord of Bourbon
- Umberto
- Reginald
- Guy, abbey of Namur

Umberto II the Fat House of Savoy Born: 1065 Died: 19 October 1103
Regnal titles
Preceded by Amadeus II	Count of Savoy c. 1080–1103	Succeeded by Amadeus III
