= Renier of Montferrat =

- Caesar
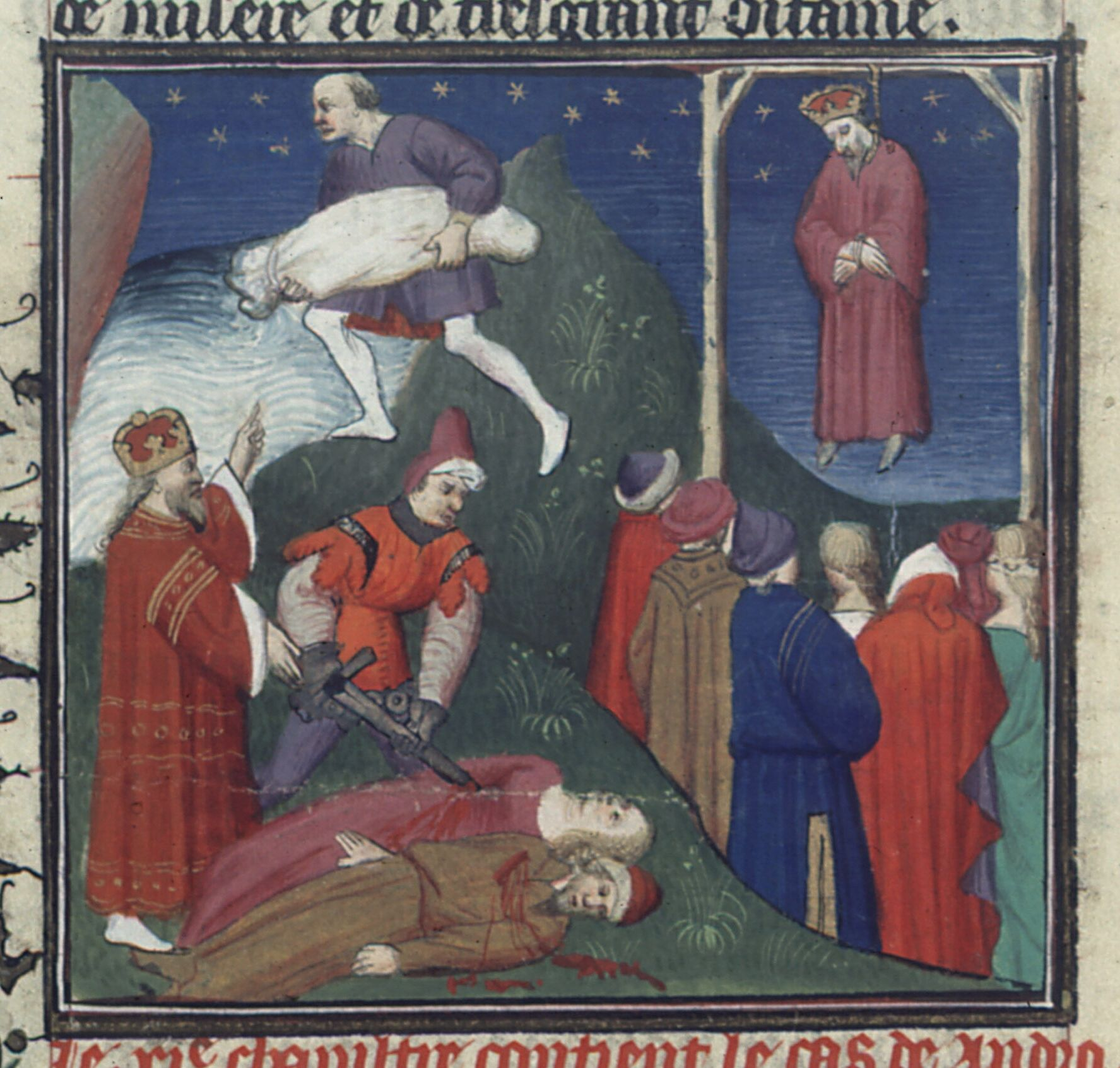
- Manuscript portrait depicting the murder of Renier and his wife
- Investiture: February 1180
- Born: 1162; Piedmont
- Died: c. 1182; Constantinople
- Spouse: Maria Komnene
- House: Aleramici
- Father: William V of Montferrat
- Mother: Judith of Babenberg

Renier of Montferrat (

Italian: Ranieri di Monferrato; ) (1162–1183) was the fifth son of William V of Montferrat and Judith of Babenberg. He became son-in-law of the Byzantine Emperor Manuel I Komnenos and Caesar in 1180, and was later murdered in a Byzantine power struggle.

== Life ==
Renier was the son of William V of Montferrat and Judith of Babenberg. It was Manuel who suggested the marriage of his daughter to a son of William V. Since Conrad and Boniface were already married, and Frederick was in the priesthood, the only eligible son was the youngest, 17-year-old Renier. The Byzantine chronicler Niketas Choniates described him as handsome, blond (his hair "shone like the sun") and beardless.

=== Caesar ===
Renier arrived in Constantinople in autumn 1179 and soon afterwards accompanied Manuel on a military expedition. His marriage to the 27-year-old Maria Porphyrogennete took place at the Church of St. Mary of Blachernae in Constantinople, in February 1180. The wedding was celebrated with lavish festivity, including games in the Hippodrome of Constantinople, as fully described by William of Tyre, who happened to be present. Renier was given the title Caesar, was renamed John, and (according to some Western sources) was granted Thessalonica, presumably as an estate for life, a pronoia. Maria was second in line to the throne, and had only been deprived of the succession by the birth of her much younger half-brother Alexios. Thus Renier became entangled in the perpetual power struggle around the Byzantine throne. With the death of Manuel in September 1180, the throne fell to the boy Alexios II, with his mother, Maria of Antioch, acting as regent. She caused a scandal by taking the protosebastos Alexios Komnenos as a lover. This, combined with Empress Maria's Latin-friendly views, triggered a plot to end the regency (or, as some describe it, to overthrow the emperor) and give power to Maria Comnena and Renier d'Aleramo. The plot was discovered, and several conspirators were arrested. Maria and Renier sought refuge in the Hagia Sophia cathedral with some 150 of their followers. Fighting ensued, later dubbed the Holy War as it took place in that most holy church. Eventually, the conspirators were offered an amnesty to end the hostilities.

=== Downfall ===
Both the emperor and the conspirators soon fell victim to another usurper; however, as Manuel's cousin and rival Andronikos Komnenos returned from exile, apparently with Maria's encouragement, and, more importantly, with an army in support. Andronikos' takeover was marked by the massacre of the Latins that followed. Maria Comnena died soon afterwards, allegedly by poison: she was, no doubt, a potential focus of opposition to the usurper. Renier seems to have shared her fate, though his death is noted by very few sources.

Alexios II was forced to recognise Andronikos as his co-emperor, and was soon murdered. The Latin massacre had not been forgotten, twenty years later, when the leaders of the Fourth Crusade found reasons to divert their expedition to Constantinople. Later sources suggest that Renier's surviving older brother Boniface based his claim to Thessalonica on his late brother's title.

== See also ==
- List of people who disappeared mysteriously (pre-1910)

== Sources ==
=== Primary ===
- Nicetas Choniates, Historia, ed. J.-L. Van Dieten, 2 vols., Berlin and New York, 1975; trans. as O City of Byzantium, Annals of Niketas Choniates, by H. J. Magoulias, Detroit; Wayne State University Press, 1984, ISBN 0-8143-1764-2

=== Secondary ===
- Haberstumpf, Walter (1995). Dinastie europee nel Mediterraneo orientale. I Monferrato e i Savoia nei secoli XII–XV. Torino.
- Kosi, Miha (2021). "The Babenberg Dukes of Austria - crusaders "par excellence"". In Bronstein, Judith; Fishhof, Gil; Shotten-Hallel, Vardit (eds.). Settlement and Crusade in the Thirteenth Century: Multidisciplinary Studies of the Latin East. Routledge. pp. 270–284.
- Runciman, Steven (1951–1954). A History of the Crusades. Vol. 1951–1954. Cambridge: Cambridge University Press.
