= Maria Komnene (daughter of Manuel I) =

Byzantine princess and heiress to the throne (1152–1182)

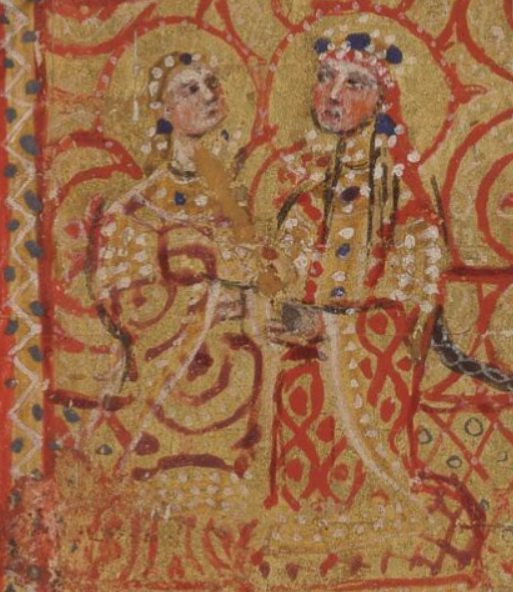
- Maria Komnene (right) with Agnes of France (left). From an illuminated manuscript, ca. 1179. (Note: The identification of these two figures from Vat. Gr. 1851 as Agnes of France and Maria Komnene is by Ioannis Spatharakis. Other historians variously identify them as the sister and wife of Andronikos IV Palaiologos or Andronikos II Palaiologos.)
- Born: Maria Komnene Porphyrogenita; March 1152; Constantinople
- Died: July 1182 (aged 30)
- Spouse: Renier of Montferrat
- House: Komnenos
- Father: Manuel I Komnenos
- Mother: Bertha of Sulzbach

Maria Komnene (or Comnena) (Greek: Μαρία Κομνηνή, Maria Komnēnē; Constantinople, March 1152 – July 1182) was the eldest daughter of the Emperor Manuel I Komnenos by his first wife, Bertha of Sulzbach. She was known as the Porphyrogennete (Πορφυρογέννητη) or Porphyrogenita because she had been "born in the Purple Chamber", i.e. born in the Palace at Constantinople to the wife of a reigning emperor.

Maria was probably born in March 1152. According to Kinnamos, she was given the title Augusta at her birth. In 1163 she was engaged to the future King Béla III of Hungary; Manuel, no longer expecting to father a legitimate son, was at that time ready to designate Béla (whom he had given the new court dignity of despotes and had renamed "Alexios") as his eventual successor. This engagement was broken off in 1169, soon after Manuel's son Alexios was born. Maria was then engaged to King William II of Sicily, but this engagement, too, was broken off by her father. Finally, in 1179, Maria was married to Renier of Montferrat, who was renamed "John" and given the title of Caesar.

After the death of the Emperor Manuel in 1180, Maria and Renier became involved in intrigues against Maria's stepmother, Maria of Antioch, who was ruling as regent for her young son, now Emperor Alexios II. A riot broke out against the empress, encouraged by Maria and Renier, but their attempt to seize power failed. Both died soon afterwards, apparently by poison, soon after the seizure of the regency by Andronikos Komnenos, a paternal first cousin of Manuel.

It seems that Maria never bore a child.

== Sources ==
- Choniates, Niketas, Historia, ed. J.-L. Van Dieten, 2 vols., Berlin and New York, 1975; trans. as O City of Byzantium, Annals of Niketas Choniates, by H.J. Magoulias, Detroit; Wayne State University Press, 1984.
- Garland, Lynda; Stone, Andrew. "Maria Porphyrogenita, daughter of Manuel I Comnenus". De Imperatoribus Romanis.
