= Gertrude of Süpplingenburg =

12th-century German duchess

- Duchess of Bavaria
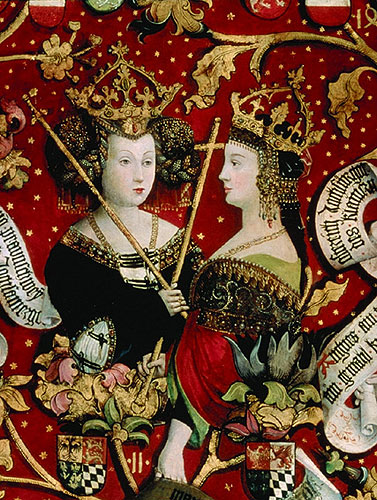
- Gertrude and Theodora Komnene, consorts of Henry II of Austria, Babenberg pedigree, Klosterneuburg Monastery, c. 1490
- Born: 18 April 1115; Germany
- Died: 18 April 1143 (aged 28); Austria
- Noble family: Supplinburger
- Spouses: Henry X, Duke of Bavaria; Henry II, Duke of Austria
- Issue: Henry the Lion
- Father: Lothair II, Holy Roman Emperor
- Mother: Richenza of Northeim

Gertrude of Süpplingenburg (18 April 1115 – 18 April 1143) was Duchess of Bavaria, Margravine of Tuscany, and Duchess of Saxony by marriage to Henry X, Duke of Bavaria, and Margravine of Austria and Duchess of Bavaria by marriage to Henry II, Duke of Austria. She was regent of Saxony during the minority of her son Henry the Lion in 1139–1142.

== Life ==
Gertrude was the only child of Lothair of Supplinburg, Duke of Saxony, and his wife Richenza of Northeim. After the death of the last Salian emperor Henry V, her father, backed by Archbishop Adalbert of Mainz was elected King of the Romans in 1125, and ruled as Holy Roman Emperor from 1133 to 1137.

=== First marriage ===
Gertrude was married to Henry the Proud, Duke of Bavaria, a dynastic arrangement meant to strengthen ties to the Welf dynasty. The lavish wedding ceremony was held on 29 May 1127 on the Lech fields near Augsburg. Indeed, Duke Henry became a loyal supporter in Lothair's struggle with the rivalling House of Hohenstaufen. The marriage also marked a significant increase of the Welf power: in 1136 Lothair vested Henry with the Italian March of Tuscany and, after the death of his father-in-law in 1137, Henry also succeeded him as Duke of Saxony. He furthermore inherited extended Saxon allodial lands around Süpplingenburg, Brunswick and Northeim. According to the contemporary chronicler Otto of Freising he ruled over a realm that stretched "from Denmark to Sicily". Henry and Gertrude had one son, Henry the Lion, born in 1129, who later became Duke of Saxony and Bavaria.

Gertrude's husband had received the Imperial Regalia from his father-in-law, however, as much powerful as arrogant, he failed to succeed Lothair as King of the Romans, when he was defeated by his Hohenstaufen rival Conrad III in the imperial election of 1138. Refusing to pay tribute, he was banned and stripped off his Bavarian and Saxon duchies, which Conrad gave to his rivals Margrave Leopold of Austria and the Ascanian margrave Albert the Bear respectively. While defending his rights in Saxony, Henry suddenly died at Quedlinburg 1139, leaving Gertrude alone with their ten-year-old son.

=== Regent ===
Acting as Saxon regent, Gertrude with the aid of her mother Empress Richenza was able to secure the inheritance rights of her son by reaching a consent with the Hohenstaufen King Conrad III. In 1142 Henry the Lion was finally vested with the Duchy of Saxony by King Conrad III, after Albert the Bear renounced his rights. Henry the Lion himself in turn renounced his succession in the Duchy of Bavaria, which Conrad ceded to the Babenberg margrave Henry II Jasomirgott of Austria.

=== Second marriage ===
Gertrude and Henry II married on 1 May 1142 in Brunswick. They had:

- Richenza (b. 1143 - d. 1200), married Landgrave Heinrich V of Steffling.

The marriage produced no male heirs, as Gertrude died in childbirth at Klosterneuburg Monastery in Austria on 18 April 1143, which was her 28th birthday. She was buried at Schottenstift, Vienna.

Henry Jasomirgott later married his second wife, Theodora Komnene, a niece of the Byzantine Emperor Manuel I Komnenos. In 1152 King Conrad was succeeded by his nephew Frederick Barbarossa, who vested Gertrude's son Henry the Lion with the Duchy of Bavaria in 1156.

== Sources ==
- Arnold, Benjamin (1991). Princes and Territories in Medieval Germany. Cambridge University Press.
- Balzani, Ugo (1926). "Italy, 1125-1152". In Tanner, J.R.; Previté-Orton, C.W.; Brooke, Z.N. (eds.). The Cambridge Medieval History, Volume 5. Vol. V: Contest of Empire and Papacy. The Macmillan Company.
- Freed, John (2016). Frederick Barbarossa: The Prince and the Myth. Yale University Press.
- Lyon, Jonathan R. (2013). Princely Brothers and Sisters: The Sibling Bond in German Politics, 1100–1250. Cornell University Press.
