= Archdiocese of Salzburg =

Catholic ecclesiastical territory

Coordinates: 47.7979°N 13.0465°E

Archdiocese of Salzburg Archidioecesis Salisburgensis Erzdiözese Salzburg

Catholic
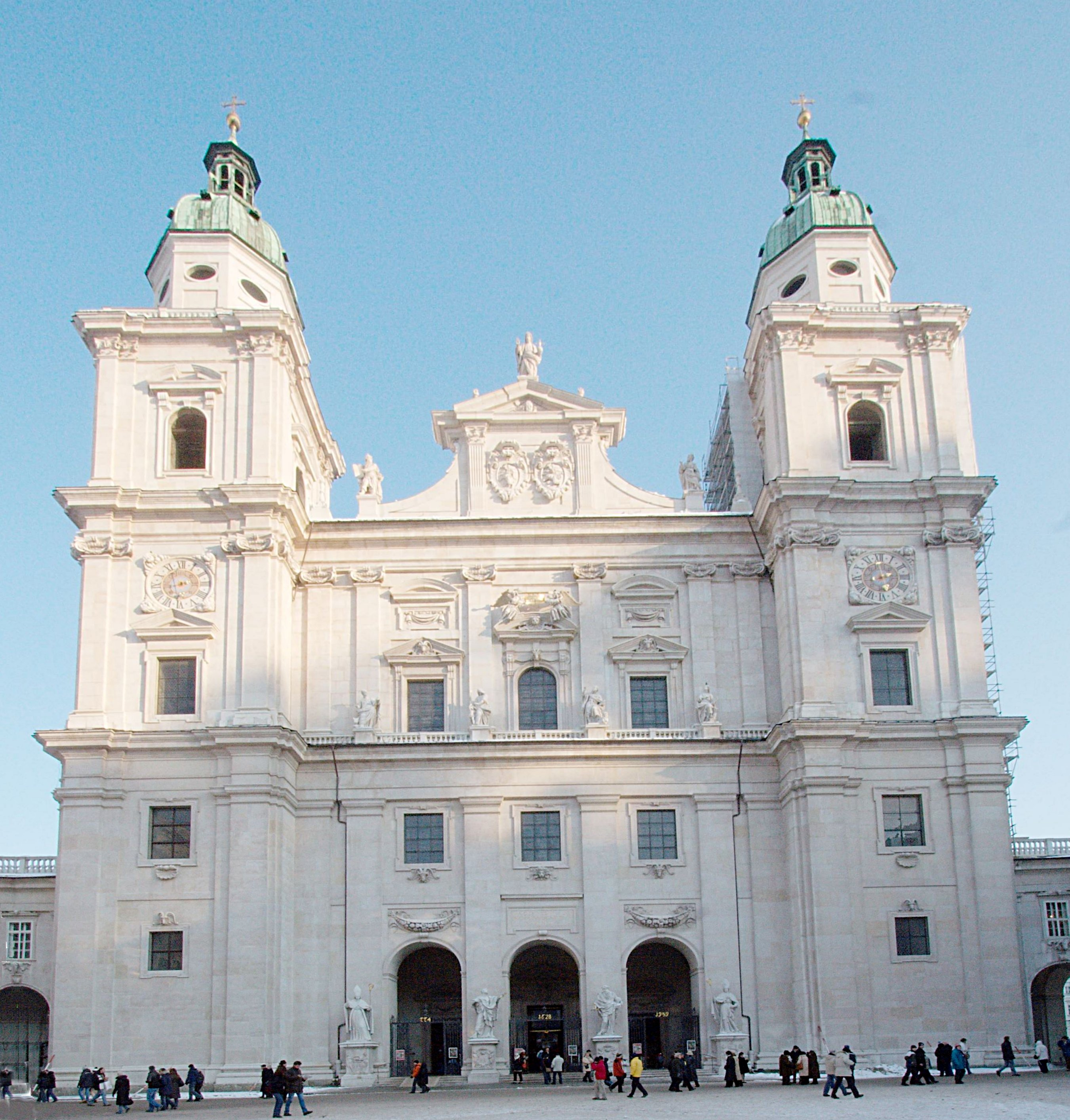
- Salzburger Dom

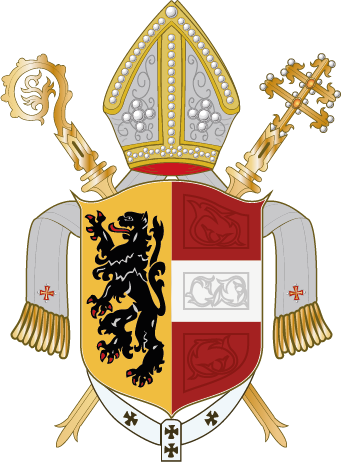
- Coat of arms

Location
- Country: Austria
- Territory: Salzburg, Tyrol
- Ecclesiastical province: Archdiocese of Salzburg
- Metropolitan: Salzburg, Salzburg

Statistics
- Area: 9,715 km^{2} (3,751 sq mi)
- Population: Total; Catholics: (as of 2020); ▲746,515; ▼460,106 (▼61.6%)
- Parishes: 210

Information
- Denomination: Roman Catholic
- Rite: Roman Rite
- Established: 20 April 798
- Cathedral: Cathedral of Saint Rupert and Saint Vergilius
- Patron saint: Saint Rupert; Saint Virgil
- Secular priests: 196 (diocesan); 97 (religious orders); 54 permanent deacons

Current leadership
- Pope: Leo XIV
- Metropolitan Archbishop: Franz Lackner, O.F.M.
- Auxiliary Bishops: Hansjörg Hofer
- Vicar General: Roland Rasser
- Episcopal Vicars: Gottfried Laireiter

Map
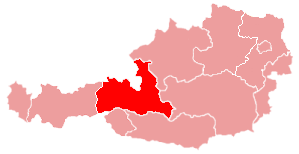

Website
- kirchen.net/portal

The Archdiocese of Salzburg (Latin: Archidioecesis Salisburgensis) is a Latin rite archdiocese of the Catholic Church, based in Salzburg, Austria. It serves as the leading diocese of the ecclesiastical province of Salzburg and is one of two Austrian archdioceses, alongside the Archdiocese of Vienna.

During the late medieval and early modern periods, the Archbishops of Salzburg held the title of prince-archbishops within the Holy Roman Empire, governing the Prince-Archbishopric of Salzburg—a distinct polity that lasted until 1803. That year, it was secularized and became the Electorate of Salzburg, ending the archbishops' temporal authority.

== History ==
The earliest evidence for Christianity in the area of Salzburg is the establishment of a religious community at or near Juvavia by a follower of Severinus of Noricum, a priest named Maximus. He and his followers were killed by invading Herulians in 477. The only contemporary notice of him occurs in the "Life of Saint Severinus" by Eugippius, who calls him a priest, not a bishop. The notion that he was a bishop derives from a Renaissance inscription in the crypt of the cathedral.

=== Establishment of the diocese ===
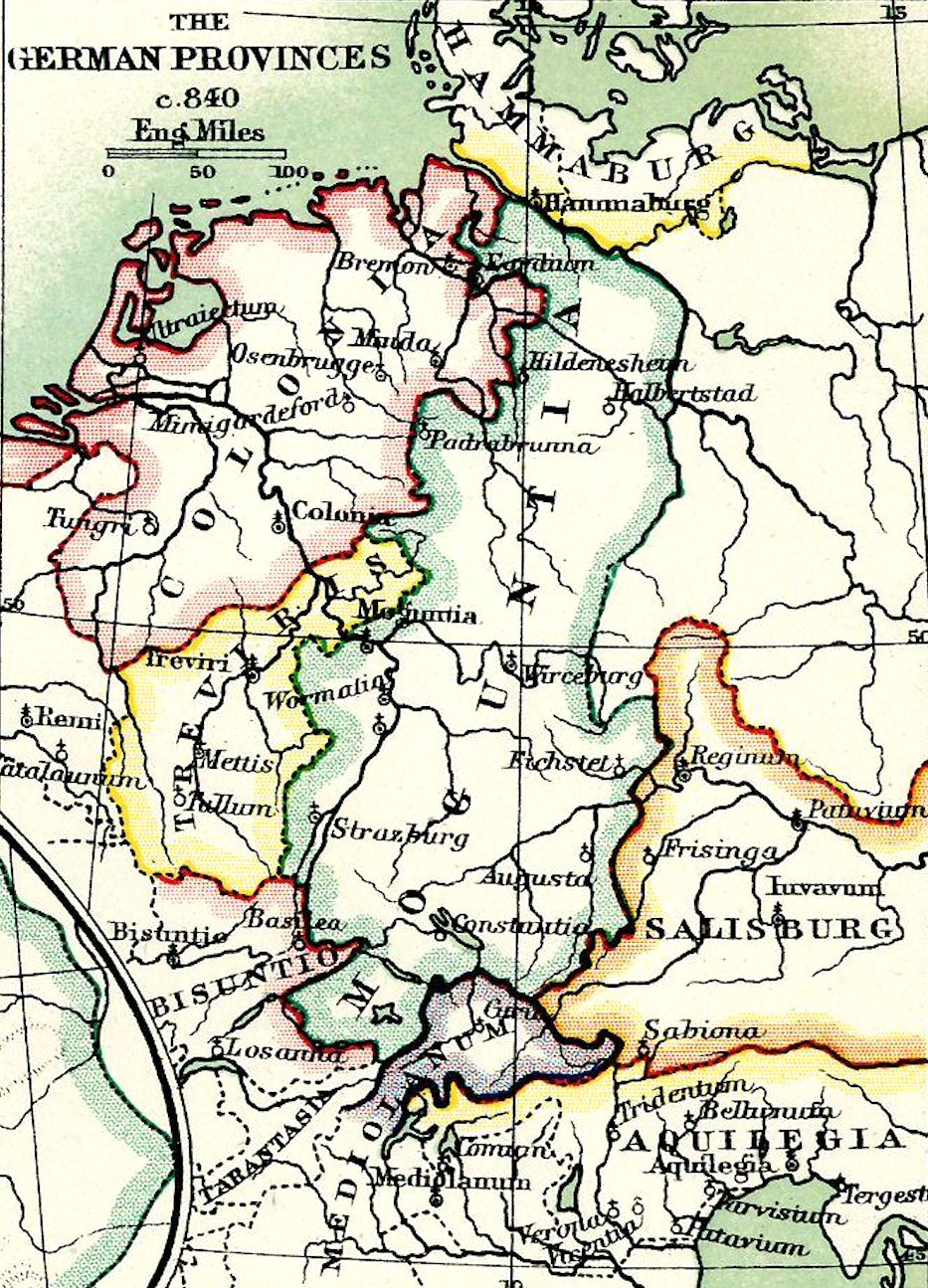
Ecclesiastical provinces, including Salzburg, in the middle of the 9th century

In 739, Boniface, the "Apostle to the Germans," divided Bavaria into four dioceses, one of which was situated at Salzburg. Boniface appointed the abbot Joannes of S. Peter's monastery in Salzburg as its bishop. The "Liber confraternitatum" of S. Peter's gives a list of Joannes' predecessors as abbot: the first was Hrodpertus, who was bishop and abbot; then Anzogolus, who was abbot; Vitalis, who was bishop and abbot; Savolus; who was abbot; Izzo, who was abbot; Florbrigis, who was bishop and abbot; and Joannes.

After the creation of the diocese, the bishops continued to live in the monastery of S. Peter, until the 12th century. On 24 September 774, Bishop Vigilius (745–784) dedicated a new church, dedicated to Bishop Hrodpertus, as his cathedral, and transferred the remains of the saint to it. The monks of S. Peter performed the religious services in S. Hrodpertus as though they were canons of the cathedral. Archbishop Conrad created a separate Chapter of canons for the cathedral of S. Hrodpertus in 1122; the archbishop's arrangements were confirmed by Pope Calixtus II on 19 February 1123, and by Pope Honorius II on 30 April 1125, who ordered the use of the Rule of S. Augustine.

On 20 April 798, at the order of Charlemagne, Pope Leo III named Salzburg a metropolitan archdiocese, with the suffragan diocenses Passau, Ratisbon, Freising, Säben-Brixen, and Neuburg. He sent Bishop Arno the pallium.

In 1070–1072, Archbishop Gebhard created the diocese of Gurk out of part of Carinthia. In 1075, Pope Gregory VII pointed out that the archbishop had not yet assigned appropriate decimae to the new diocese. The boundaries of the diocese of Gurk were finally delimited in 1131 by Archbishop Conrad, and the decima tax assigned in 1144.

On 28 February 1163, Pope Alexander III appointed Archbishop Eberhard of Salzburg his legate for the German kingdom (Legatum in regno Teutonico).

=== Archbishop Adalbert and Frederick Barbarossa ===
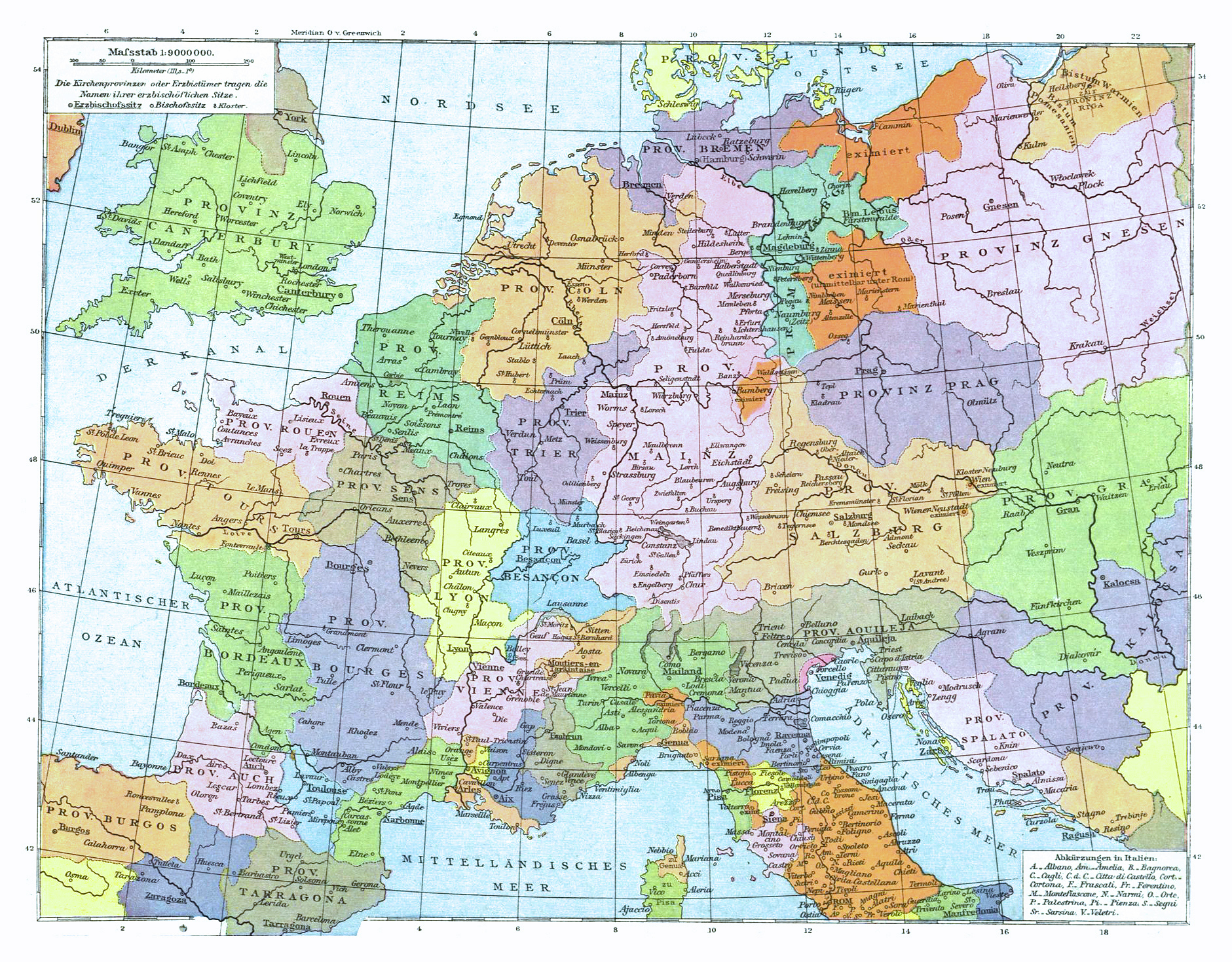
Ecclesiastical provinces of Europe, including Salzburg, around 1500

Archbishop Adalbert (Vojtěch) was the third son of Vladislaus II, Duke and King of Bohemia, and Gertrude of Babenberg, Duchess of Bohemia, the daughter of Leopold III, Margrave of Austria. Elected in the autumn of 1168, he was enthroned on 1 November, and on 16 March 1169 consecrated a bishop by the Patriarch of Aquileia, and on 23 March Cardinal Conrad von Wittelsbach presented him with the pallium which had been sent by Pope Alexander. In the schism which had begun at the papal election of 1159, Adalbert took the side of Alexander III against the minority of imperialist cardinals who elected Cardinal John of Struma as antipope Calixtus III (1168–1178). When the archbishop appeared as summoned at the diet of Babenberg on 8 June 1169, the Emperor Frederick Barbarossa refused to receive him, and at the beginning of August invaded the territory of Salzburg. On 28 January 1171, Pope Alexander wrote to the king of Bohemia and to the duke of Austria, urging them to come to the aid of the archbishop, who was being harassed by the schismatics. In 1172, on 20 February, the emperor held a diet at Salzburg, to which the archbishop was not invited; he appeared anyway, but did not receive a friendly welcome from the emperor. The bishop of Gurk and the Provost, Dean and Chapter of Salzburg informed the pope that Frederick was pressuring them to elect a different archbishop of Salzburg. In 1173, Barbarossa attacked both Austria and Bohemia, and deposed Archbishop Adalbert's father and uncle Henry II, Duke of Austria.

On 26 May 1174, Frederick Barbarossa held another diet in Ratisbon, attended by nearly all the important men in Germany, and by all the suffragan bishops of Salzburg, except the Bishop of Freising. Archbishop Adalbert and his uncle Henry, Duke of Austria, were present. The stated purpose of the meeting was to decide on the tenure of the diocese of Salzburg by Adalbert. A motion to depose the archbishop was presented by Richerius, the bishop-elect of Brixen, and agreed to by all the leaders of the kingdom except Duke Henry of Austria. At the emperor's command, the assembly elected Heinrich, the Prior of Berchtesgaden, as the new archbishop. On 8 September 1174, Pope Alexander voided all the actions of the diet against Adalbert, and declared Heinrich intrusus.

Archbishop Adalbert of Bohemia was deprived of the diocese of Salzburg by Pope Alexander III on 9 August 1177, to win the favor of the Emperor. Archbishop-elect Heinrich was named bishop of Brixen, on the instigation of the emperor. Cardinal Conrad of Mainz was appointed archbishop of Salzburg.

Adalbert was restored to his diocese on 19 November 1183, ex praecepto Imperatoris. Pope Lucius III confirmed him in all his rights and privileges in a bull of 3 December 1184.

=== Pope Innocent IV and the See of Salzburg ===
In 1246 (or 1247), Pope Innocent IV issued a decree inhibiting all the cathedral Chapters in Germany from electing a new bishop to a vacant see without consultation with the pope and obtaining his consent. He was well aware that a number of German bishops were supporters of Frederick II, and that, when their sees fell vacant, it was imperative to supply them with successors loyal to the papacy. Archbishop Eberhard of Salzburg had been a supporter of Frederick since 1240, and when he died on 1 December 1246, Pope Innocent was prepared to act, but the Chapter had already unanimously elected Philippus, the son of Duke Bernhard von Kärnten and grandson of King Ottokar I of Bohemia, Provost of Vyšehrad. Innocent paid no attention to their presumption. On 25 February 1247, he wrote to the Chapter of Salzburg that he had appointed the Provost of Fritzlar, Burcardus, to the post of archbishop of Salzburg, and he consecrated him with his own hands. Unfortunately, Archbishop Burcardus died during his journey from Avignon to Salzburg, at Salmannsweiler im Breisgau, at the end of July or beginning of August 1247.

On 12 October 1247, Pope Innocent immediately appointed his subdeacon and chaplain, Philippus, as procurator of the Church of Salzburg, and ordered the Provost and Chapter of the cathedral to obey him as procurator and administrator. Philippus von Kärnten, as archbishop-elect, according to the "Salzburg Chronicle", at the mandate of the pope of 6 February 1249, held a provincial synod in Mühldorf that Spring. The bishops of Frising, Ratisbon, and Seckau were present. Philippus is again noticed as the Elect of Salzburg in 1250, 1251, and 1252. On 20 May 1251, Pope Innocent was compelled to write to the Dean of the cathedral of Ratisbon, charging him to suspend and excommunicate Philippus if he did not obey the agreements approved and mandates given by the pope. Finally, in 1256, the new pope, Pope Alexander IV had heard enough of Philippus' tyrannical behavior, his belligerent attitudes, and his insolent refusal to obey papal orders; he authorized the Church of Salzburg to choose a new archbishop. The leaders of the church assembled and chose Ulrich, Bishop of Seckau, as the new archbishop. The action was contested by Stephen Gutkeled, the Duke of Zagreb (Carinthia) and King Béla IV of Hungary, who promised to support Philippus. The Provost and the Scholasticus of the cathedral headed a delegation to Rome, accompanied by archbishop-elect Ulrich, to acquaint the pope with their activities. Finally, on 5 September 1257, Pope Alexander confirmed the deposition of Philippus and the succession of Archbishop Ulrich; on 19 September 1257, he wrote to the Provost and Chapter of Salzburg, rehearsing everything that had taken place, and confirming Ulrich as archbishop of Salzburg.

=== Synods ===
Archbishop Arno (785–821) held a provincial synod on 20 January 799; he held another on 16 January 807. Archbishop Eberhard of Regensburg 1200–1246) held a provincial synod in 1219. In 1569, Archbishop Johann Jakob von Kuen-Belasy (1560–1586) presided over a provincial synod.

== Suffragan dioceses ==
- Feldkirch
- Graz–Seckau
- Gurk
- Innsbruck

== Episcopal Ordinaries ==
=== Bishops of Iuvavum (from 755, Salzburg) ===
- Hrodbertus (Ruprecht) c. 698 – c. 718.
- Vitalis
- Erkenfried
- Ottokar
- Flobrigis
- Johann I
- Virgil of Salzburg, c. 745 or c. 767 – c. 784

=== Archbishops of Salzburg, 798–1213 ===
- Arno 785–821
- Adalram 821–836
- Liupram 836–859
- Adalwin 859–873
- Adalbert I 873
- Dietmar (I) 873–907
- Pilgrim 907–923
- Adalbert (II) 923–935
- Egilholf 935–939
- Herhold 939–958
- Friedrich (I) 958–991
- Hartwig 991–1023
- Günther 1024–1025
- Dietmar (II) 1025–1041
- Baldwin 1041–1060
- Gebhard 1060–1088

Berthold of Moosburg (1085–1106) Intrusus

- Thiemo 1090–1101
- Konrad von Abensberg 1106–1147
- Eberhard von Hilpolstein-Biburg 1147–1164
- Konrad (II) of Austria 1164–1168
- Adalbert III of Bohemia 1168–1177

Heinrich (1174–1177) Intrusus

- Conrad von Wittelsbach 1177–1183
- Adalbert III of Bohemia (restored) 1183–1200.

=== Prince-Archbishops of Salzburg, 1213–1803 ===
==== From 1213 to 1400 ====
- Eberhard of Regensburg 1200–1246
- Bruccardus of Ziegenhain 1247
- Philipp of Carinthia 1247–1256
- Ulrich of Sekau 1256–1265
- Ladislaus of Salzburg 1265–1270
- Frederick II of Walchen 1270–1284
- Rudolf of Hoheneck 1284–1290
- Conrad von Vonstorff (Breitenfurt) 1291–1312
- Weichard of Pollheim 1312–1315
- Frederick (III) von Leibnitz 1315–1338
- Henry of Pirnbrunn 1338–1343
- Ordulf of Wiesseneck 1343–1365
- Pilgrim von Puchheim 1365–1396
- Gregor Schenk von Osterwitz (6 Jun 1396 Appointed – 9 May 1403)

==== From 1400 to 1803 ====
- Berthold von Wehingen (1404 – Jan 1406 Resigned)
- Eberhard von Neuhaus (1406 – 1427)
- Eberard von Starhemberg (11 Apr 1427 Confirmed – 9 Feb 1429)
- Johann von Reisberg (1429 Elected – 1441)
- Friedrich Truchseß von Emmerberg (30 Sep 1441 Elected – 3 Apr 1452)
- Sigmund von Volkersdorf (10 Apr 1452 Elected – 3 Nov 1461)
- Burkhard von Weißpriach (16 Nov 1461 Elected – 16 Feb 1466)
- Bernhard von Rohr (25 Feb 1466 Elected – 21 Mar 1487)
- Johann Beckenschlager (21 Mar 1487 Succeeded – 15 Dec 1489)
- Friedrich Graf von Schaumberg (19 Dec 1489 Elected – 4 Oct 1494)
- Sigmund von Hollenegg (16 Oct 1494 Elected – 1495)
- Leonhard von Keutschach, C.R.S.A. (7 Jul 1495 Elected – 8 Jun 1519)
- Matthäus Lang von Wellenburg (8 Jun 1519 Succeeded – 30 Mar 1540)
- Michael von Kuenburg (21 Jul 1554 Elected – 17 Nov 1560)
- Johann Jakob von Kuen-Belasy (28 Nov 1560 Elected – 4 May 1586)
- Georg von Kuenburg (4 May 1586 Succeeded – 25 Jan 1587)
- Wolf Dietrich von Raitenau (2 Mar 1587 Elected – 7 Mar 1612 Resigned)
- Markus Sittikus von Hohenems (1612 – 1619)
- Paris von Lodron (13 Nov 1618 Elected – 15 Dec 1653 Died)
- Guidobald of Thun (3 Feb 1654 Elected – 1 Jun 1668)
- Maximilian Gandolf Reichsgraf von Kuenburg (30 Jul 1668 Elected – 3 May 1687)
- Johann Ernst Reichsgraf von Thun (30 Jun 1687 Elected – 20 Apr 1709)
- Franz Anton Fürst von Harrach zu Rorau (20 Apr 1709 Succeeded – 18 Jul 1727)
- Leopold Anton Eleutherius Reichsfreiherr von Firmian (4 Oct 1727 Elected – 22 Oct 1744)
- Jakob Ernst Graf von Liechtenstein-Kastelkorn (1745 – 1747)
- Andreas Jakob Reichsgraf von Dietrichstein (10 Sep 1747 Elected – 5 Jan 1753)
- Sigismund Christoph von Schrattenbach (5 Apr 1753 Elected – 16 Dec 1771)
- Hieronymus Colloredo von Wallsee und Mels (1772 – 1812)

Sede vacante (1812–1823)

=== Archbishops (from 1823) ===
- Augustin Johann Joseph Gruber (17 November 1823 Confirmed – 28 June 1835)
- Friedrich Johann Joseph Cölestin zu von Schwarzenberg (1 February 1836 Confirmed – 20 May 1850 Confirmed)
- Maximilian Joseph von Tarnóczy (17 Feb 1851 Confirmed – 4 April 1876 Died)
- Franz de Paula Albert Eder, O.S.B. (29 Sep 1876 Confirmed – 10 April 1890 Died)
- Johannes Evangelist Haller (26 June 1890 Confirmed – 5 May 1900 Died)
- Johannes Baptist Katschthaler (17 December 1900 Confirmed – 27 February 1914 Died)

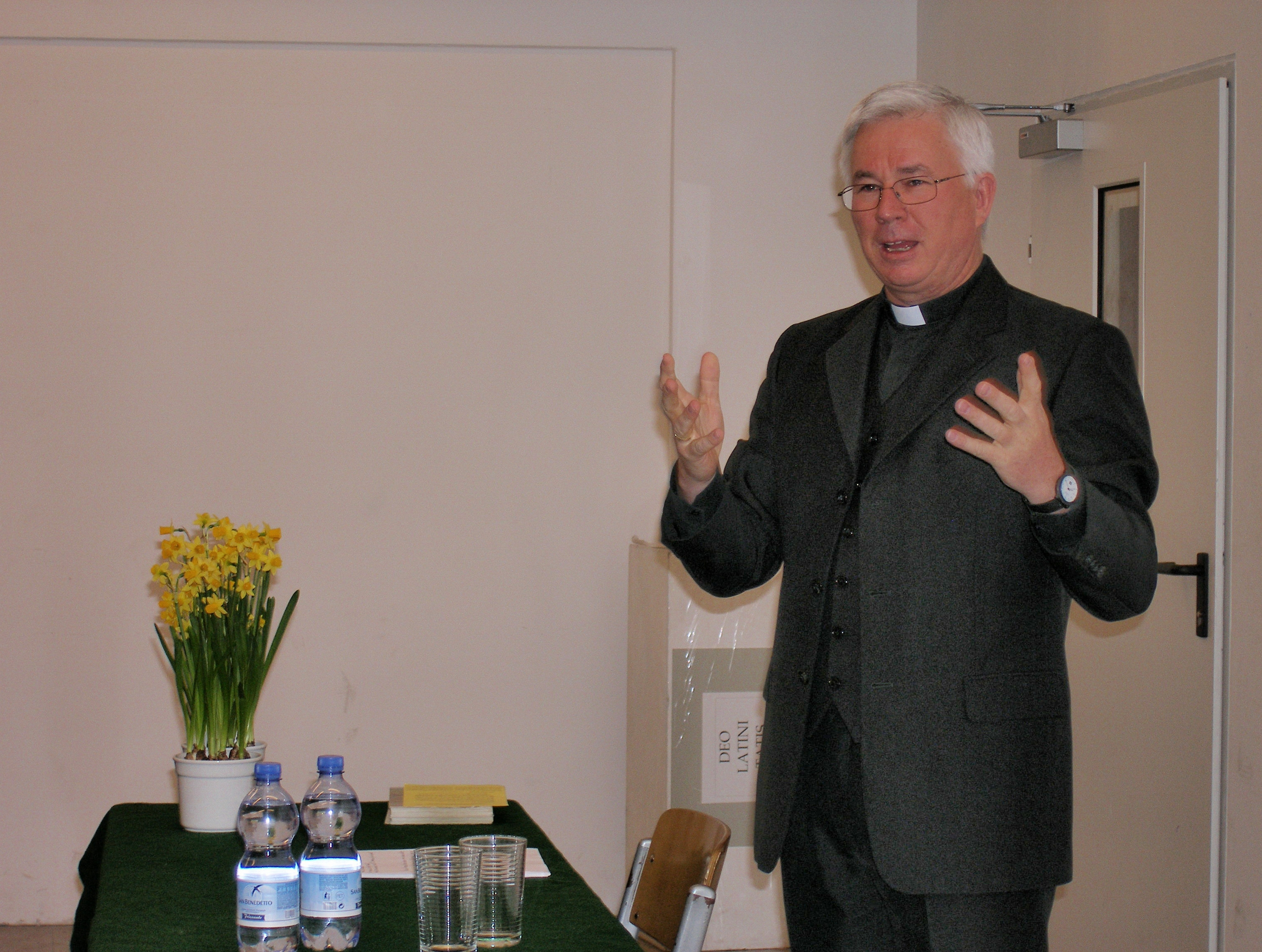
Archbishop Franz Lackner OFM

- Balthasar Kaltner (25 May 1914 Confirmed – 8 July 1918 Died)
- Ignatius Rieder (7 October 1918 Confirmed – 8 October 1934 Died)
- Sigismund Waitz (17 December 1934 Confirmed – 30 October 1941 Died)
- Andreas Rohracher (1 May 1943 Confirmed – 30 June 1969 Retired)
- Eduard Macheiner (18 October 1969 Confirmed – 17 July 1972 Died)
- Karl Berg (9 January 1973 Confirmed – 5 September 1988 Retired)
- Georg Eder (17 January 1989 Confirmed – 23 November 2002 Resigned)
- Alois Kothgasser, S.D.B. (27 November 2002 Appointed – 4 November 2013 Retired)
- Franz Lackner, O.F.M. (18 November 2013 Appointed – present)

== Bibliography ==
=== Reference works for bishops ===
- Gams, Pius Bonifatius (1873). Series episcoporum Ecclesiae catholicae: quotquot innotuerunt a beato Petro apostolo (in Latin). Ratisbon: Typis et Sumptibus Georgii Josephi Manz. pp. 307-309.
- Eubel, Conradus, ed. (1913). Hierarchia catholica (in Latin). Vol. 1 (Tomus I) (second ed.). Münster: Libreria Regensbergiana. (in Latin)
- Eubel, Conradus, ed. (1914). Hierarchia catholica (in Latin). Vol. 2 (Tomus II) (second ed.). Münster: Libreria Regensbergiana. archived
- Eubel, Conradus; Gulik, Guilelmus, eds. (1923). Hierarchia catholica (in Latin). Vol. 3 (Tomus III) (second ed.). Münster: Libreria Regensbergiana.
- Gauchat, Patritius (Patrice) (1935). Hierarchia catholica. Vol. 4 (Tomus IV) (1592–1667). Münster: Libraria Regensbergiana.
- Ritzler, Remigius; Sefrin, Pirminus (1952). Hierarchia catholica medii et recentis aevi. Vol. 5 (Tomus V) (1667–1730). Patavii: Messagero di S. Antonio.
- Ritzler, Remigius; Sefrin, Pirminus (1958). Hierarchia catholica medii et recentis aevi. Vol. 6 (Tomus VI) (1730–1799). Patavii: Messagero di S. Antonio.
- Ritzler, Remigius; Sefrin, Pirminus (1968). Hierarchia Catholica medii et recentioris aevi (in Latin). Vol. VII (1800–1846). Monasterii: Libreria Regensburgiana.
- Remigius Ritzler; Pirminus Sefrin (1978). Hierarchia catholica Medii et recentioris aevi (in Latin). Vol. VIII (1846–1903). Il Messaggero di S. Antonio.
- Pięta, Zenon (2002). Hierarchia catholica medii et recentioris aevi (in Latin). Vol. IX (1903–1922). Padua: Messagero di San Antonio. ISBN 978-88-250-1000-8.

=== Studies ===
- Brackmann, Albertus (ed.) (1911). Germania pontificia, Vol. 1, Pars I: Provincia Salisburgensis et episcopatus Tridentinus. (in Latin). Berlin: Weidmann 1911.
- Dalham, Florianus (1788). Concilia Salisburgensia provincialia et dioecesana jam inde ab hierarchiae hujus origine ... ad nostram usque actatem celebrata. (in Latin). Augst: Matthaei Rieger filii, 1788.
- Fischer, Wilhelm (1916). Personal- und Amtsdaten der Erzbischöfe von Salzburg (798-1519). (in German). Anklam: Richard Poettcke Nachfolger 1916.
- Hansiz, Marcus. Germaniae sacræ: Archiepiscopatus Salisburgensis : chronologice propositus. (in Latin). Tomus I (1727).Tomus II. Augusta Vindelicorum (Augsburg): Happach & Schlüter, 1729.
- Henricus Archidiaconus, "Historia calamitatum ecclesiae Salsiburgiensis," (in Latin), in: J.-P. Migne (ed.), Patrologiae cursus completus: Series latina, Volume 196 (Paris: apud Garnier fratres, 1880), pp. 1539-1552.
- Hiibiier, K. (1909). "Die Provinzialsynoden im Erzbistum Salzburg bis zum Ende des XV. Jahrhunderts," (in German), in: Deutsche Geschichtsblatter Vol. X (1909), pp. 187—236.
- Jung, Armand (1864). Series abbatum monasterii O.S.B. ad S. Petrum Salisburgi. (in Latin). Salzburg: Duyle, 1864.
- Meiller, Andreas von (1866). Regesta episcorum Salisburgensium inde ab anno MCVI usque ad annum MCCXLVI: Regesten zur Geschichte der Salzburger Erzbischöfe Conrad I, Eberhard I, Conrad II, Adalbert, Conrad III und Eberhard II. (in German and Latin). Wien: C. Gerolds Sohn 1866.
- Ortner, Franz (1988). Salzburger Kirchengeschichte. Von den Anfängen bis zur Gegenwart. (in German). Salzburg: Anton Pustet 1988. ISBN 3-7025-0252-1.
- Tietze, Hans; Martin, Franz (1912). Die kirchlichen Denkmale der Stadt Salzburg: mit Ausnahme von Nounberg und St. Peter. Wien: A. Schroll 1912.
- Wartenhorst, August Jaksch von; Wiessner, Hermann. Monumenta historica Ducatus Carinthiae: Bd. Die Gurker Geschichtsquellen, 804-1232. Klagenfurt: Commissionsverlag von F. v. Kleinmayr, 1896
- Wartenhorst, August Jaksch von; Wiessner, Hermann. Monumenta historica Ducatus Carinthiae: Die Gurker Geschichtsquellen (Schluss) 1233-1269. (in Latin and German). Klagenfurt: Commissionsverlag von F. v. Kleinmayr, 1898

=== External links ===
- "Archdiocese of Salzburg". Catholic-Hierarchy.org. David M. Cheney.
