= Burgruine Gutrat =

Castle ruin in Austria

Coordinates: 47°42′29″N 13°03′38″E

- Salzburg, Austria
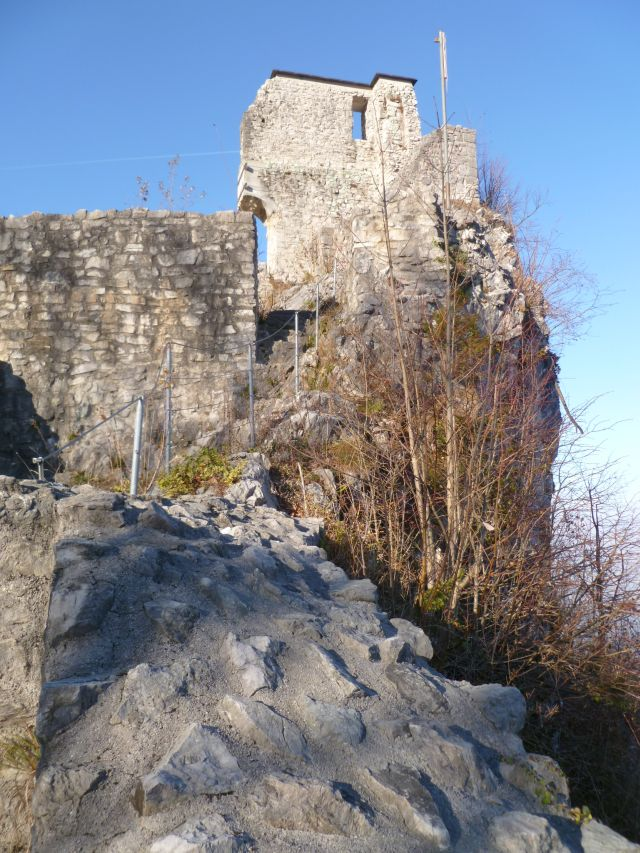

Site information
- Type: Rock castle

Site history
- Built: around 1100 to 1200
- Built by: Adalbert III of Bohemia

Burgruine Gutrat is a ruined castle near Hallein in the state of Salzburg, Austria.

== See also ==
- List of castles in Austria
