= Conrad of Babenberg =

12th-century Austrian nobleman and cleric

Conrad II
- Archbishop of Salzburg
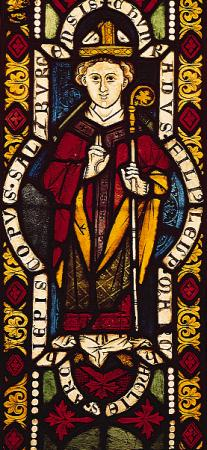
- Conrad of Babenberg, as depicted on a 13th-century stained glass window in the Cistercian Abbey of Heiligenkreuz, Austria
- In office: 1164 - 1168
- Predecessor: Eberhard I
- Successor: Adalbert III
- Previous post: Bishop of Passau (1148/9 - 1164)

Personal details
- Born: c. 1115 Klosterneuburg
- Died: 28 September 1168 Admont
- Denomination: Roman Catholic

Conrad of Babenberg (c. 1115 – 28 September 1168) was a nobleman and prelate of the Holy Roman Empire. He was the bishop of Passau (as Conrad I) from 1148/1149 until 1164 and then archbishop of Salzburg (as Conrad II) and Primate until his death, although he lost control of Salzburg when he was placed under the imperial ban in 1166.

Conrad came from the House of Babenberg. His father, Leopold III, was the Margrave of Austria, while his mother, Agnes of Waiblingen, was the daughter of the Emperor Henry IV. Prior to her marriage to Leopold, Agnes was married to Frederick I, Duke of Swabia, of the House of Hohenstaufen. Through Frederick, she was the mother of one king of Germany and grandmother of another: Conrad III (1138–52) and Frederick I (1152–90), Conrad of Babenberg's half-brother and nephew, respectively. One of Conrad's full brothers, Otto, became the famous bishop of Freising.

Conrad was a member of the royal chapel under his half-brother Conrad III. In 1140 he became the dean of Utrecht and in 1143 dean of Hildesheim also. He was elected bishop of Passau probably in 1148. His episcopate was marked by the strong enforcement of ecclesiastical discipline. Beginning in 1158, he was involved in a dispute, the so-called Passau Feud (Passauer Fehde), with his brother, Duke Henry II of Austria, over the certain jurisdictional exemptions granted to Henry in the Privilegium Minus. In 1159, Conrad gave the citizens of Sankt Pölten a degree of self-government theretofore unknown in Austria.

After the death of Archbishop Eberhard in 1164, Conrad was elected his successor on 29 June with a majority of the diocesan clergy in favour of continuing support for Pope Alexander III against the emperor's rival claimant, Paschal III. Since the election took place without the permission of the Emperor Frederick I, Conrad's nephew, he refused to invest Conrad with the regalia of his office, which would have allowed Conrad to exercise secular rule over the prince-bishopric. Unfortunately for him, Conrad lacked the diplomatic skills or the high moral reputation of Eberhard. At an Imperial Diet held in Würzburg in May 1165, he was ordered to submit to Frederick. He steadfastly refused, and on 29 March 1166 Frederick imposed the imperial ban.

The count of Plain (Conrad's nephew via his sister Uta) was charged with taking control of the diocese. Conrad fled Salzburg, first to Friesach and then to Admont, from where he tried to administer what was left of his diocese and its fiefs. He seems to have come to an agreement with Frederick shortly before his death. His successor as Archbishop was his nephew, Adalbert.
