= Gertrude of Babenberg, Duchess of Bohemia =

Duchess consort of Bohemia from 1140 to 1150

Gertrude of Babenberg
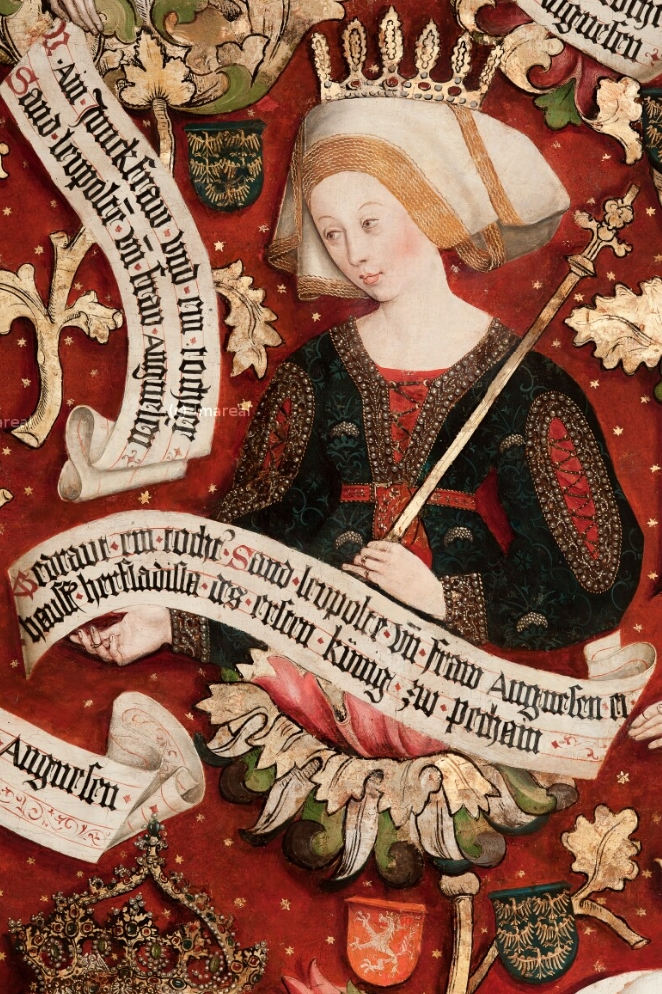
- Portrait in the Babenberg Family Tree Triptych, Klosterneuburg Monastery, Austria

Duchess consort of Bohemia
- Tenure: 1140–1150
- Born: c. 1118
- Died: 8 April 1150; Prague, Bohemia
- Spouse: Vladislaus II, Duke of Bohemia
- Issue Detail: Frederick, Duke of Bohemia; Adalbert III of Bohemia
- House: Babenberg
- Father: Leopold III, Margrave of Austria
- Mother: Agnes of Germany

Gertrude of Babenberg (Czech: Gertruda Babenberská; c. 1118 – 8 April 1150), a member of the House of Babenberg, was Duchess consort of Bohemia from 1140 until her death, by her marriage to the Přemyslid duke Vladislaus II.

== Life ==
She was the daughter of Margrave Leopold III of Austria (died 1136) and his second wife, the Salian heiress Agnes of Waiblingen. Upon the death of her father, Gertrude's brother Leopold IV succeeded as Austrian margrave and in 1138 married the Přemyslid princess Maria of Bohemia, a cousin of her future husband.

Gertrude married Vladislaus II, the eldest son of the late Duke Vladislaus I of Bohemia in 1140. Her husband had left the Duchy of Bohemia during the rule of his uncle, Duke Soběslav I, but was recalled by the local nobility after Soběslav's death. Through her mother, Gertrude was a half-sister of the Hohenstaufen king Conrad III of Germany, thus a good catch for Vladislaus. At the time of the siege of Prague by his cousin Count Conrad II of Znojmo in 1142, she successfully defended Prague Castle with the help of her brother-in-law Děpold, while Vladislaus sought assistance from King Conrad III.

Gertrude participated in projects of her husband Vladislaus to found new religious institutions and due to her encouragement, the duke invited foreign religious orders to establish themselves in Bohemia. She gave birth to five children and died in 1150 at the age of 30 at her residence in Prague. Had she lived another 8 years, she would have been the second Queen consort of Bohemia.

== Issue ==
- Frederick, Duke of Bohemia (Bedřich; d. 1189)
- a daughter (Richeza?), married Yaroslav II of Kyiv
- Svatopluk, married Odola, a daughter of King Géza II of Hungary
- Adalbert III of Bohemia (Vojtĕch; 1145–1200), Archbishop of Salzburg
- Agnes (Anežka; d. 1228), abbess of St George of Prague

== Literature ==
- ŽEMLIČKA, J. Čechy v době knížecí 1034–1198. Praha: NLN, 2002. 660 p. ISBN 80-7106-196-4.

Gertrude of Babenberg, Duchess of Bohemia House of Babenberg Born: c. 1118 Died: 8 April 1150
Royal titles
| Preceded by Adelaide of Hungary | Duchess consort of Bohemia; 1140–1150 | Succeeded by Judith of Thuringia |
