= Thietmar II =

Thietmar II, Dietmar II or Ditmar II may refer to:

- Thietmar, Margrave of Meissen (died 979), sometimes numbered Thietmar II
- Thietmar, Margrave of the Saxon Ostmark (died 1030), sometimes numbered Thietmar II
- Dietmar II (archbishop of Salzburg) (r. 1025–1041)
- Dietmar II, abbot of Metten Abbey (r. 1079–1092)
- Thietmar II, abbot of Helmarshausen Abbey (r. 1080–1112)
- Dietmar II von Plötzkau, bishop of Verden (r. 1116–1148)
- Dietmar II (abbot of Niederaltaich) (r. 1179–1202)
- Dietmar II von Stockhausen, abbot of Corvey (r. 1206–1216)
- Dietmar II, abbot of Saint Peter's Abbey, Salzburg (r. 1270–1288)
- Dietmar II, abbot of Seitenstetten Abbey (r. 1337–1348)
