= Agnes of Germany =

Agnes of Germany may refer to:

- Agnes of Poitou (died 1077), wife of King Henry III of Germany
- Agnes of Waiblingen (died 1143), daughter of King Henry IV of Germany
