= Wolfgang Schmeltzl =

Wolfgang Schmeltzl (c. 1505 – 1564) was a German teacher, writer and composer, and Roman Catholic clergyman.

== Life ==
Schmeltzl was born about 1505 in Kemnath in the Upper Palatinate in Germany, and studied at the University of Vienna from 1523. In the 1530s he was a cantor at Kastl Abbey and afterwards in Weiden in der Oberpfalz. During the 1540s he was a teacher at the Scottish Abbey in Vienna. It is thought he was ordained in the early 1550s; in 1556 he became pastor of St Lorenz am Steinfeld in Lower Austria, where he died in 1564.

== Works ==
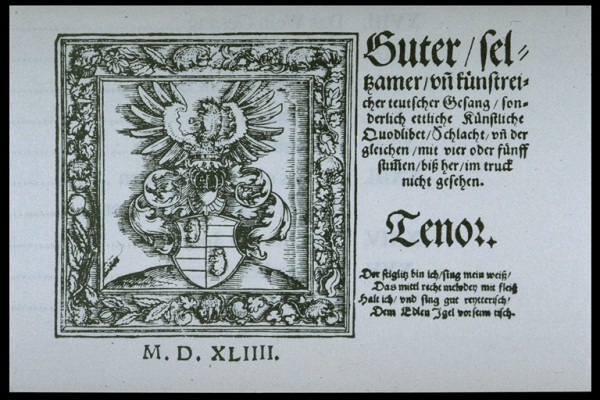
The title page of Schmeltzl's song collection Guter seltzsamer und künstreicher teutscher Gesang (Nuremberg 1544)

During his time at the Scottish Abbey, Schmeltzl wrote a series of school plays on religious subjects, one being performed each year during the 1540s. It is thought that there were eight plays, of which seven survive.

A collection of four-part songs, Guter seltzsamer und künstreicher teutscher Gesang ("Good, unusual and ingenious German vocal music") was printed by Johannes Petreius in Nuremberg in 1544. It includes eleven quodlibets and nine priamels, and several pictorial songs, including Schlacht vor Pavia ("Battle of Pavia"). Most of the pieces are anonymous.

Lobspruch der Hochlöblichen Stat Wienn ("In praise of the highly admirable city of Vienna"), published in 1547, is a description of Vienna. His biographer in Allgemeine Deutsche Biographie (1890) wrote: "The influence of similar works by Hans Sachs is unmistakable here; like him, Schmeltzl understands excellently how to turn description into progressive, lively action."
