= Eberhard I (archbishop of Salzburg) =

Archbishop of Salzburg

Saint Eberhard
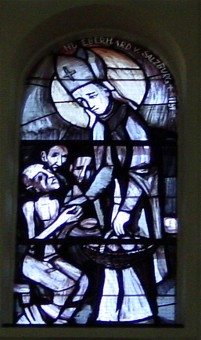
- Heiliger-Eberhard-Salzburg

Archbishop of Salzburg
- Born: Nuremberg, Germany
- Died: 1164; Rein Abbey, Gratwein, Styria, Austria
- Venerated in: Roman Catholic Church
- Feast: 22 June

Eberhard was Archbishop of Salzburg, Austria from 1146 until his death in 1164.

== Life ==
Eberhard was born to a noble family of Nuremberg, Germany; he became a Benedictine in 1125 at Pruffening, Germany. Later he was made Abbot of Biburg near Regensburg. In 1146 Pope Innocent II appointed him Archbishop of Salzburg.

He rose to fame as a mediator when Pope Alexander III was faced with the controversy surrounding the Papal election of 1159, created by Holy Roman Emperor Frederick I Barbarossa who supported antipope Victor IV. Eberhard wrote to Hildegard of Bingen, requesting her prayers during this stressful time. Eberhard intended to attend the Council of Pavia in 1160, but only got as far as Treviso due to ill health.

Although Archbishop Eberhard I, Count of Hippoldstein, steadily supported Alexander, Barbarossa left him in peaceful possession of his see. Frederick saw Eberhard as a potential arbiter. Eberhard was greatly respected for his piety, learning, and integrity; and Frederick needed the support of the German princes for his Italian campaigns.

Eberhard was one of the most able of the prelates of his age. He died in 1164, at the age of seventy-nine, returning from another peace keeping mission.

== Notes ==
Catholic Church titles
Preceded by Conrad I	Archbishop of Salzburg; 1147–1164	Succeeded by Conrad II
