= Agnes of Waiblingen =

Duchess of Swabia from 1082 to 1105

- Duchess consort of Swabia; Margravine consort of Austria
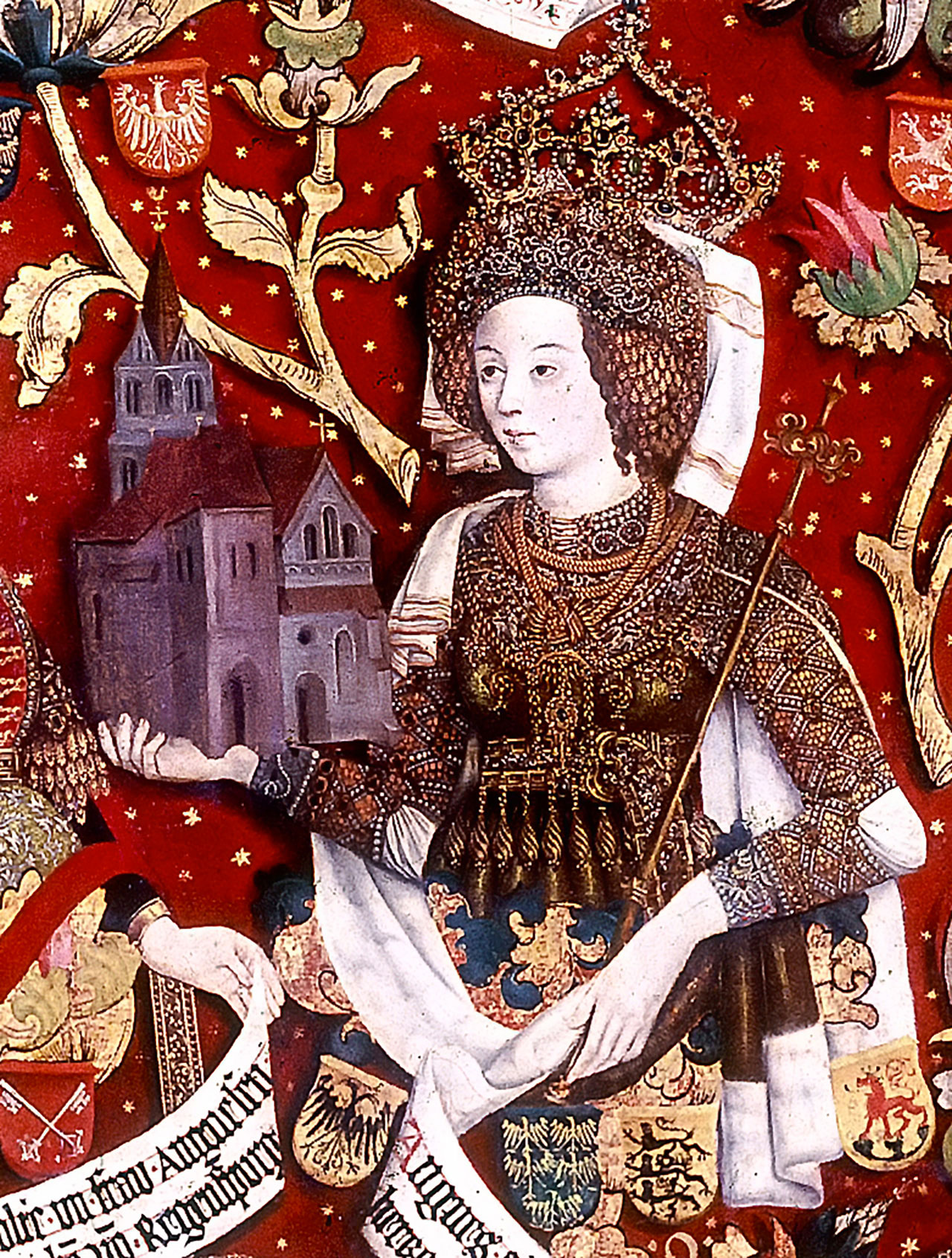
- Margravine Agnes, Babenberg pedigree, Klosterneuburg Monastery, c. 1490
- Born: c. 1072
- Died: 24 September 1143 (aged 70–71); Klosterneuburg
- Noble family: Salian
- Spouses: Frederick I, Duke of Swabia; Leopold III, Margrave of Austria
- Issue: Frederick II, Duke of Swabia; Conrad III, King of Germany; Leopold IV, Duke of Bavaria; Henry II, Duke of Austria; Agnes, High Duchess of Poland; Otto I, Bishop of Freising; Conrad II, Archbishop of Salzburg; Elizabeth, wife of Hermann, Count of Winzenburg; Judith, Marchioness of Montferrat; Gertrude, Duchess of Bohemia
- Father: Henry IV, Holy Roman Emperor
- Mother: Bertha of Savoy

Agnes of Waiblingen (1072/73 – 24 September 1143), also known as Agnes of Germany, Agnes of Franconia and Agnes of Saarbrücken, was a member of the Salian imperial family. Through her first marriage, she was Duchess of Swabia; through her second marriage, she was Margravine of Austria.

== Family ==
Agnes was the daughter of Henry IV, Holy Roman Emperor, and Bertha of Savoy. She was named after her paternal grandmother, Agnes of Poitou. She had two siblings, Adelaide/Adelheid and Henry, who died in infancy, and two brothers, Conrad, and Henry. Her mother died when she was around 15, and around 17, her father remarried to Eupraxia of Kiev.

Agnes' toponymic byname of Waiblingen references the German town of Waiblingen, an important Salian stronghold at the time. However, this is a modern designation, and there is no contemporary evidence for her having been born in Waiblingen, or being called of Waiblingen by others during and after her lifetime.

== First marriage ==
In 1079, aged seven, Agnes was betrothed to Frederick, a member of the Hohenstaufen dynasty; at the same time, Henry IV invested Frederick as the new duke of Swabia. The couple married in 1086, when Agnes was fourteen. They had two sons and three daughters:

- Frederick II of Swabia
- Conrad III of Germany
- Gertrud, who married Hermann III, Count Palatine of the Rhine
- Heilika, who married Frederick III of Pettendorf-Lengenfeld-Hopfenche, and were the parents to Heilika of Lengenfeld
- Richildis, who married Hugh I, Count of Roucy

In 1977, German genealogist and historian Hansmartin Decker-Hauff claimed to have found several other children in documents from the abbey of Lorch, the Staufers' family monastery. These claims were later exposed as forgeries. Historian Heinz Bühler's suggestion that Berta of Boll, the wife of Count Adalbert of Elchingen-Ravenstein, was Agnes' and Frederick's daughter is purely speculative.

== Second marriage ==
Following Frederick's death in 1105, Agnes married Leopold III (1073–1136), the Margrave of Austria (1095–1136). According to a legend, a veil lost by Agnes and found by Leopold years later while hunting was the instigation for him to found the Klosterneuburg Monastery.

Their children were:

- Adalbert
- Leopold IV
- Henry II of Austria
- Berta, married Heinrich III, Burgrave of Regensburg
- Agnes, "one of the most famous beauties of her time", married Wladyslaw II of Poland
- Ernst
- Uta, married Luitpold I, Count of Plain
- Otto of Freising, bishop and biographer
- Conrad, Bishop of Passau, and Archbishop of Salzburg
- Elisabeth, married Hermann, Count of Winzenburg
- Judith, married c. 1133 William V of Montferrat. Their children formed an important Crusading dynasty.
- Gertrude, married Vladislav II of Bohemia

According to the Continuation of the Chronicles of Klosterneuburg, there may have been up to seven other children (possibly from multiple births) stillborn or who died in infancy.

In 2013, documentation regarding the results of DNA testing of the remains of the family buried in Klosterneuburg & Heiligenkreuz strongly favor that Adalbert was the son of Leopold and Agnes.

In 1125, Agnes' brother, Henry V, Holy Roman Emperor, died childless, leaving Agnes and her children as heirs to the Salian dynasty's immense allodial estates, including Waiblingen.

In 1127, Agnes' second son, Konrad III, was elected as the rival King of Germany by those opposed to the Saxon party's Lothar III. When Lothar died in 1137, Konrad was elected to the position.

== Sources ==
- Bolton, Brenda (2008). "A Matter of Great Confusion: King Richard I and Syria's Vetus de Monte". In Beihammer, Alexander Daniel; Parani, Maria G.; Schabel, Christopher David (eds.). Diplomatics in the Eastern Mediterranean 1000-1500: Aspects of Cross-Cultural Communication. Brill. pp. 171–206.
- Lyon, Jonathan R. (2013). Princely Brothers and Sisters: The Sibling Bond in German Politics, 1100-1250. Cornell University Press.
- Karl Lechner, Die Babenberger, 1992.
- Brigitte Vacha & Walter Pohl, Die Welt der Babenberger: Schleier, Kreuz und Schwert, Graz, 1995.
- Ancestral Roots of Certain American Colonists Who Came to America Before 1700 by Frederick Lewis Weis, Line 45-24
- Robinson, I.S. (2003). Henry IV of Germany, 1056-1106. Cambridge University Press.
- H. Decker-Hauff, Die Zeit der Staufer, vol. III (Stuttgart, 1977).
