= Henry II of Austria =

Henry II Jasomirgott
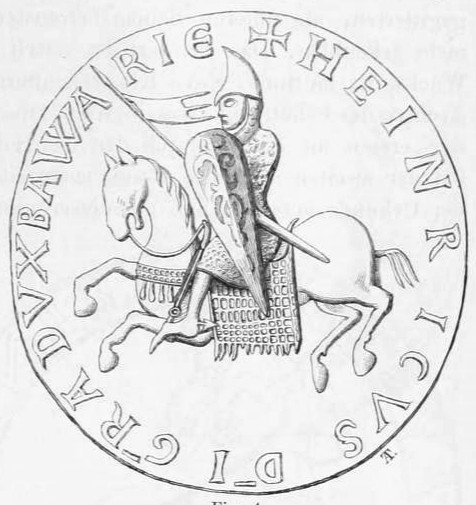
- Effigy on Henry's seal

Margrave/Duke of Austria
- Reign: 1141–1177
- Predecessor: Leopold the Generous
- Successor: Leopold V

Duke of Bavaria
- Reign: 1141–1156
- Predecessor: Leopold
- Successor: Henry the Lion
- Born: 1107
- Died: 13 January 1177 (aged 69–70); Vienna, Austria
- Burial: Schottenstift, Vienna
- Spouse: Gertrude of Süpplingenburg; Theodora Comnena
- Issue: Agnes, Queen of Hungary; Leopold V, Duke of Austria; Henry I, Duke of Mödling
- House: House of Babenberg
- Father: Leopold III, Margrave of Austria
- Mother: Agnes of Germany

Henry II (German: Heinrich; 1107 – 13 January 1177), called Jasomirgott, a member of the House of Babenberg, was Count Palatine of the Rhine from 1140 to 1141, Duke of Bavaria (as Henry XI) and Margrave of Austria from 1141 to 1156, and the first Duke of Austria from 1156 until his death.

== Family ==
Henry was the second son of Margrave Leopold III of Austria, from his second marriage with Agnes of Waiblingen, a sister of the last Salian emperor, Henry V. Leopold himself was expected to stand as a candidate in the 1125 election as king of Germany; nevertheless, he renounced in favour of his step-son (and Henry's half-brother), the Hohenstaufen duke Frederick II of Swabia, who eventually lost against Lothair of Supplinburg. Among Henry's younger brothers were Bishop Otto of Freising and Archbishop Conrad II of Salzburg. His sister Judith became the wife of Marquess William V of Montferrat.

Henry's nickname, Jasomirgott, was first documented during the 13th century in the form of Jochsamergott, the meaning of which is unclear. According to popular etymology, it is derived from the Middle High German form of the oath joch sam mir got helfe (meaning: "Yes, so help me God").

== Reign ==
When Margrave Leopold III died in 1136, he was succeeded by his third-born son Leopold IV, probably because Henry already administered the Rhenish possessions of his mother's now-extinct Salian dynasty. In April 1140, the Hohenstaufen king Conrad III of Germany enfeoffed him with the County Palatine of the Rhine, which he ruled for only a short time as he was appointed Bavarian duke and margrave of Austria when his younger brother Leopold IV unexpectedly died in October 1141. Leopold had received the Duchy of Bavaria in 1139, after King Conrad had deposed Duke Henry the Proud in the course of the dispute between the Welf and Hohenstaufen dynasties.

Henry took his residence in the Bavarian capital of Regensburg (Ratisbona). In May 1142 he married Gertrude, daughter of Emperor Lothair and widow of Henry the Proud. She died after less than one year, giving birth to her only child with Henry.

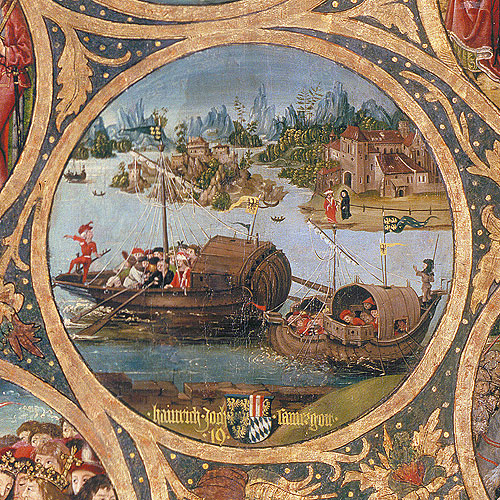
Henry II on the Second Crusade, Babenberg Pedigree, Klosterneuburg Monastery (1489–1492)

The duke remained a loyal follower of the Hohenstaufens and in May 1147 accompanied King Conrad on the Second Crusade. When they suffered a disastrous defeat at the Battle of Dorylaeum against the Seljuk Turks in October, Henry narrowly escaped together with Conrad's nephew, young Frederick Barbarossa. Later on, he attended the Council of Acre along with king Conrad III and Frederick Barbarossa, then the Siege of Damascus. On their way home, Henry stayed at the court of the Byzantine emperor Manuel I Komnenos, where he married his niece Theodora in late 1148.

Elected king of Germany in 1152, Frederick Barbarossa tried to reach a compromise with the Welfs and endowed Henry the Lion, son of the late Henry the Proud, with the Duchy of Bavaria in 1156. A replacement duchy had to be found for the Babenberg family, which was accomplished by the Privilegium Minus, through which Frederick elevated Henry's Margraviate of Austria to a duchy with complete independence from Bavaria.

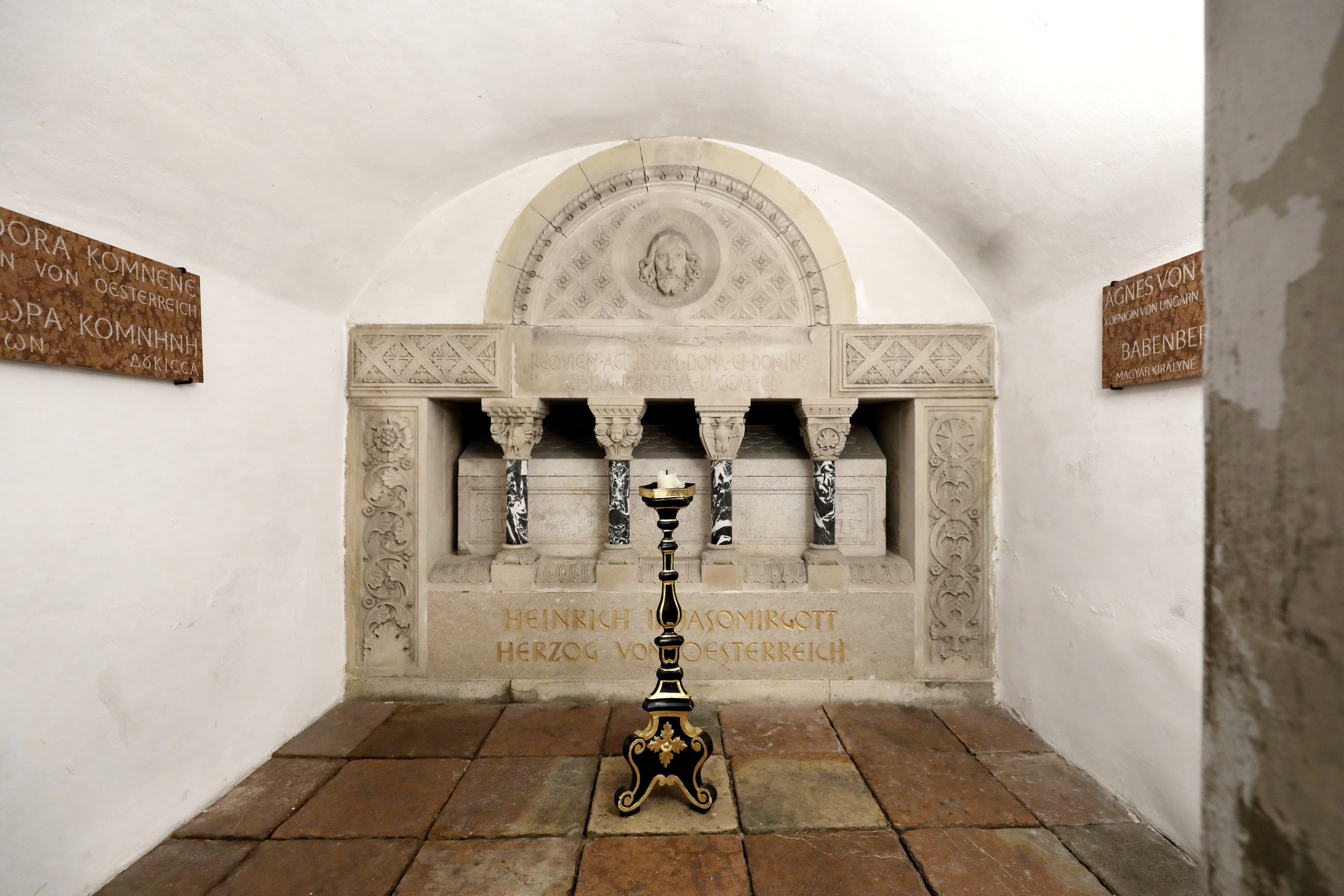
Sarcophagus of Duke Heinrich II in the crypt of Vienna's Schottenkirche

Unlike his father, who had resided in Klosterneuburg most of the time, Henry moved his Austrian residence to Vienna in 1145. Only by this act could Vienna surpass other cities within the duchy, such as Krems, Melk, and Klosterneuburg. Since then, it has remained the capital of the country. In addition, in 1147 the first St. Stephen's Church was completed, becoming a visible landmark for the city and showing its prominence. In 1155, Henry founded the Schottenstift monastery in Vienna, in the courtyard of which a statue of him stands to this day.

In November 1176, while his Austrian lands were campaigned by the forces of Duke Soběslav II of Bohemia, Henry II with his horse fell from a rotten bridge near Melk and suffered a femoral neck fracture. Henry II succumbed to his injuries on 13 January 1177 in Vienna. According to his last will, he was buried in the Schottenstift monastery.

== Marriage and children ==
Until 1143, Henry II was married to Gertrude of Süpplingenburg, the daughter of Emperor Lothair II. In 1148 he married Theodora Komnene, niece of the Byzantine emperor Manuel I. Both marriages were an expression of the importance of the Babenberg dynasty in Central Europe in that period.

Henry had one child by Gertrude of Süpplingenburg:

- Richenza (1143 – unknown), married to Heinrich Landgraf von Steffling

Henry had three children by Theodora Komnene:

- Agnes of Austria (c. 1154 – 13 January 1182), married to King Stephen III of Hungary, secondly married to Duke Herman of Carinthia
- Leopold V, Duke of Austria (1157 – 31 December 1194)
- Henry I, Duke of Mödling (1158 – 31 August 1223), married Richeza, daughter of Duke Vladislav II of Bohemia.

== Sources ==
- Beller, Steven (2007). A Concise History of Austria. New York: Cambridge University Press. ISBN 978-0521478861.
- Brooke, Z. N. (1938). A History of Europe: From 911 to 1198. London: Methuen & Company Ltd. ISBN 978-1443740708.
- Dopsch, Heinz (1999). Österreichische Geschichte 1122-1278. Vienna: Ueberreuter. ISBN 3-8000-3973-7.
- Lechner, Karl (1976). Die Babenberger: Markgrafen und Herzoge von Österreich 976–1246. Vienna: Böhlau. ISBN 978-3205085089.
- Leeper, Alexander W. (1941). History of Medieval Austria. London: Oxford University Press. ISBN 978-0404153472.
- Lingelbach, William E. (1913). The History of Nations: Austria-Hungary. New York: P. F. Collier & Son Company. ASIN B000L3E368.
- Loud, Graham A.; Schenk, Jochen, eds. (2017). The Origins of the German Principalities, 1100-1350: Essays by German Historians. Routledge.
- Loud, Graham (2019). The Chronicle of Arnold of Lübeck. Routledge. ISBN 978-1138211780.170
- Lyon, Jonathan R. (2013). Princely Brothers and Sisters: The Sibling Bond in German Politics, 1100–1250. Cornell University Press.
- Pohl, Walter (1995). Die Welt der Babenberger. Graz: Verlag Styria. ISBN 978-3222123344.
- Rickett, Richard (1985). A Brief Survey of Austrian History. Vienna: Prachner. ISBN 978-3853670019.
- Wegener, Wilhelm (1965). Genealogischen Tafeln zur mitteleuropäischen Geschichte. Vienna: Verlag Degener.

Henry II of Austria House of Babenberg Born: 1107 Died: 13 January 1177
Regnal titles
Preceded by Leopold the Generous	Duke of Bavaria; 1141–1156	Succeeded by Henry the Lion
Preceded by Leopold the Generous	Margrave (Duke) of Austria; 1141–1177	Succeeded by Leopold the Virtuous
Preceded by William of Ballenstedt	Count Palatine of the Rhine; 1140–1141	Succeeded by Herman III of Stahleck
