= Hartwig (archbishop of Salzburg) =

Archbishop of Salzburg (d. 1023)

Hartwig (Latin: Hartwicus; died 5 December 1023) was the archbishop of Salzburg from 991 until his death. He was a younger son of the Bavarian count palatine Hartwig of the Aribonid family. The Gesta archiepiscoporum Salisburgensium calls him a "friend of divine praise" (divinae laudis amicus).

On 23 December 970, Hartwig became a subdeacon in Salzburg Cathedral. On 19 September 973 he was promoted to deacon, and on 18 September 985 he was ordained a priest. On 12 August 991 he was consecrated as the successor to Archbishop Frederick. He took part in the Easter synod at Ingelheim that denied the validity of the election of Gerbert of Aurillac to the vacant archdiocese of Reims.

In 996, Hartwig accompanied the young king, Otto III, to Rome for his imperial coronation in May. There he participated in the election and ordination of Pope Gregory V, who performed the coronation. For his role in the coronation, Otto granted Hartwig the right to hold a market at Salzburg and the right to mint coin. A record of the various gifts and transactions of Hartwig's episcopate has survived in the form of a "tradition book" (Traditionsbuch).

After Otto's death, Henry supported the election of Henry II, whom he accompanied to Mainz for his coronation in 1002. Thereafter the king showered him with gifts and privileges. In 1007, Hartwig was present when Henry founded the diocese of Bamberg. In 1012, he was present at the consecration of the new cathedral. In 1014, he was present at the coronation of Henry as Holy Roman Emperor in Rome.

In his later years, Hartwig extended the choir of the cathedral. He worked with Anastasius Aschericus, the archbishop of Esztergom, to establish the Hungarian mission field. In 1020 he received six Königshufen (literally "royal hooves", an old unit of land) at Bamberg.

== Sources ==
- Eldevik, John (2012). Episcopal Power and Ecclesiastical Reform in the German Empire: Tithes, Lordship and Community, 950–1150. Cambridge: Cambridge University Press.
- Lerber, Karin von (1992). "A Medieval Bell-Shaped Chasuble from St. Peter in Salzburg". Journal of the Museum of Fine Arts, Boston. 4: 27–51.
- Uhlirz, Mathilde (1969). "Hartwig". Neue Deutsche Biographie. Vol. 8. p. 14.
