= Leopold III, Margrave of Austria =

Margrave of Austria from 1095 to 1136

Saint Leopold III
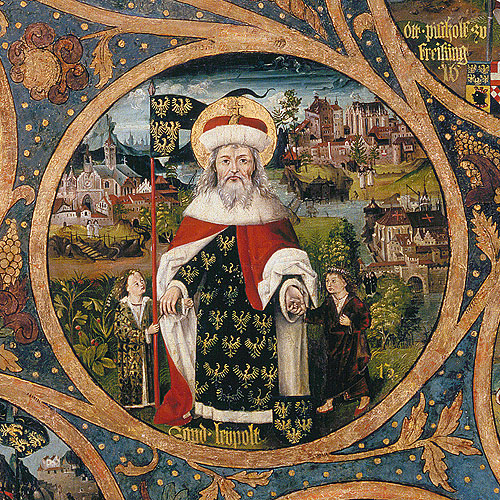
- Saint Leopold III with two deceased sons, Babenberger Stammbaum, Klosterneuburg Monastery, 1489–1492

Margrave of Austria
- Born: 1073; Babenberg Castle, Gars am Kamp, Lower Austria
- Died: 15 November 1136; Klosterneuburg Monastery, Lower Austria (incl. burial)
- Venerated in: Catholic Church
- Canonized: 6 January 1485 by Pope Innocent VIII
- Feast: 15 November
- Attributes: Model of church
- Patronage: Austria, Lower Austria, Upper Austria, Vienna, House of Habsburg, death of children, large families, step-parents

Leopold III
- Margrave of Austria
- Margrave: 1095–1136
- Predecessor: Leopold II
- Successor: Leopold IV
- Family: House of Babenberg
- Spouse: Agnes of Germany
- Issue: Leopold IV, Duke of Bavaria; Henry II of Austria; Agnes; Otto of Freising; Conrad II, Archbishop of Salzburg; Judith; Gertrude
- Father: Leopold II
- Mother: Ida of Formbach-Ratelnberg

Leopold III (German: Luitpold, Latin: Leupoldus, 1073 – 15 November 1136), known as Leopold the Good, was the Margrave of Austria from 1095 to his death in 1136. He was a member of the House of Babenberg. He was canonized on 6 January 1485 and became the patron saint of Austria, Lower Austria, Upper Austria and Vienna. His feast day is 15 November.

== Biography ==
Leopold was born at Babenberg castle in Gars am Kamp, the son of Margrave Leopold II and Ida of Formbach-Ratelnberg. The Babenbergs had come to Austria from Bavaria where the family had risen to prominence in the 10th century. He grew up in the diocese of Passau under the influence of the reformer bishop Altmann of Passau.

In 1095, Leopold succeeded his father as margrave of Austria at the age of 22. He married twice. His first wife, who died in 1105, may have been one of the von Perg family. The following year he married Agnes, the widowed sister of Emperor Henry V whom he had supported against her father Henry IV. This connection to the Salians raised the importance of the House of Babenberg, to which important royal rights over the margraviate of Austria were granted. Also, Agnes had influential connections through her previous marriage to Frederick of Hohenstaufen, one of her sons being Conrad III of Germany.

Leopold called himself "Princeps Terræ", a reflection of his sense of territorial independence. He was considered a candidate in the election of the Kaiser of the Holy Roman Empire in 1125, but declined this honour.

He is mainly remembered for the development of the country and, in particular, the founding of several monasteries. His most important foundation is Klosterneuburg (1108). According to legend, the Virgin Mary appeared to him and led him to a place where he found the veil of his wife Agnes, who had lost it years earlier. He established the Klosterneuburg Monastery there. He subsequently expanded the settlement to become his residence.

Leopold also founded the monasteries of Heiligenkreuz, Kleinmariazell and Seitenstetten which developed a territory still largely covered by forest. All of these induced the church to canonize him in 1485.

Leopold also fostered the development of cities, such as Klosterneuburg, Vienna and Krems. The last one was granted the right to mint but never attained great importance.

The writings of Henry of Melk and Ava of Göttweig, which are the first literary texts from Austria, date back to Leopold's time.

He is buried in the Klosterneuburg Monastery, which he founded. His skull is kept in an embroidered reliquary, which leaves the forehead exposed; it also wears an archducal hat.

In 1663, under the rule of his namesake Emperor Leopold I, he was declared patron saint of Austria instead of Coloman of Stockerau.

The brothers Joseph and Michael Haydn, each of whom sang in the choir of St. Stephen's Cathedral, both sang in that capacity at Klosterneuburg on this day. Joseph Haydn later became the more famous composer of the two. Michael Haydn later (in 1805) wrote a mass in honour of Leopold, the Missa sub titulo Sancti Leopoldi.

Since the death of Emperor Leopold I, the King's Feast is celebrated in Belgium on Leopold's feast day.

== Children ==
His first marriage, to Maria/Adelheid von Perg, was childless.

By his second wife, Agnes of Germany, widow of Frederick I, Duke of Swabia:

- Adalbert
- Henry II Jasomirgott (1107–1177)
- Leopold IV (c. 1108 – 1141)
- Berta, m. Henry III, Burgrave of Regensburg
- Agnes (c. 1108/13 – c. 1160/63), m. Władysław II of Poland
- Ernst
- Uta, m. Luitpold I, Count of Plain
- Otto of Freising (c. 1114 – 1158), Bishop of Freising, and biographer of his nephew (from his mother's first marriage), Emperor Frederick I Barbarossa
- Conrad, Bishop of Passau and Archbishop of Salzburg
- Elisabeth, m. Hermann II of Winzenburg
- Judith, m. William V of Montferrat
- Gertrude, m. Duke (later King) Vladislaus II of Bohemia

According to the Continuation of the Chronicles of Klosterneuburg, there may have been up to seven others (possibly from multiple births) stillborn or who died in infancy.

In 2013, documentation regarding the results of DNA testing of the remains of the family buried in Klosterneuburg & Heiligenkreuz strongly favor that Adalbert was the son of Leopold and Agnes.

== Gallery ==
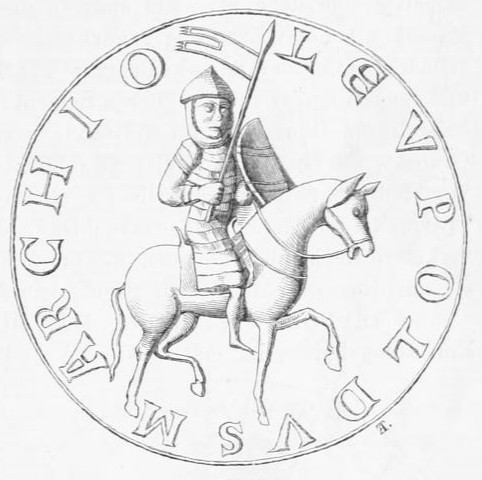
Leopold III seal

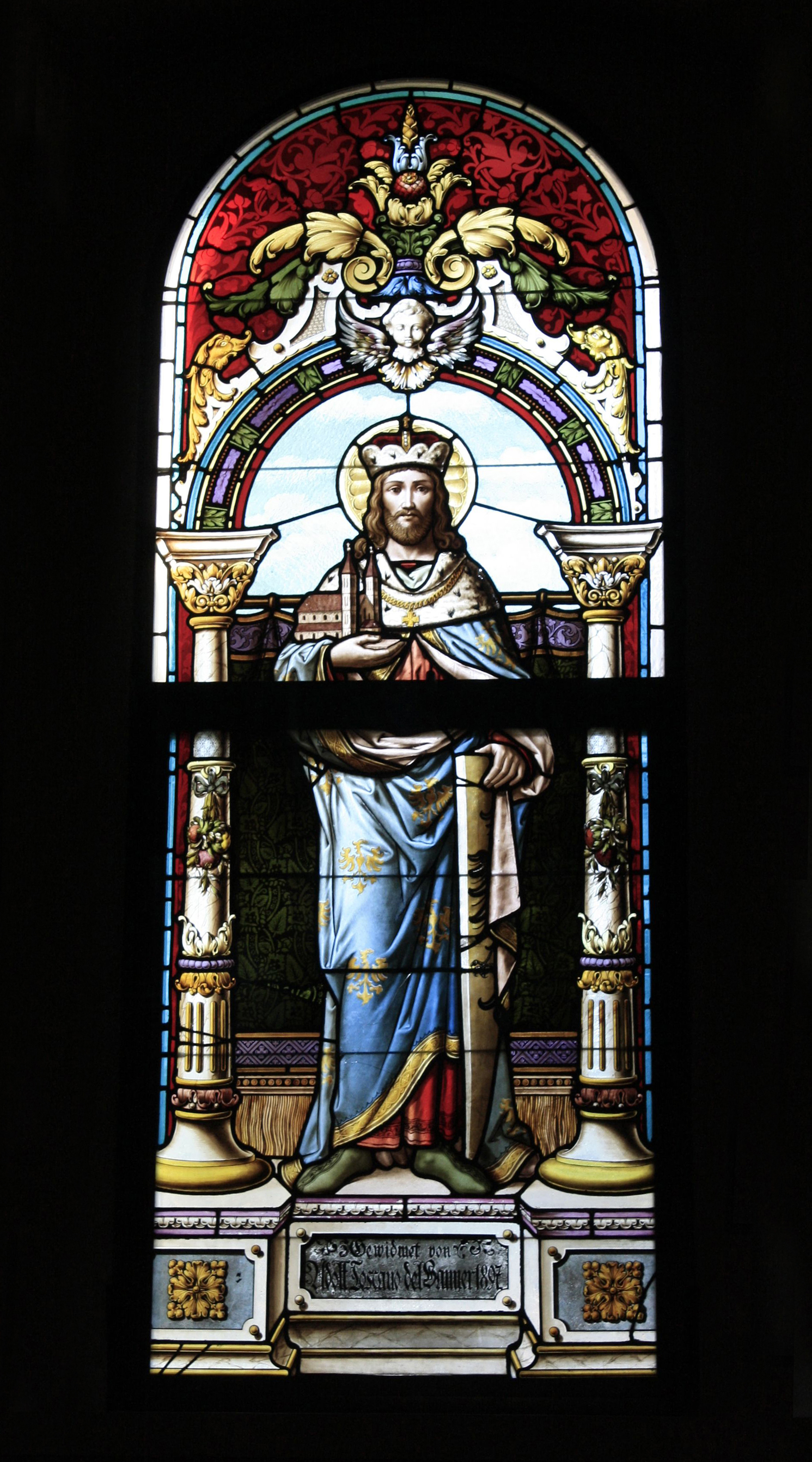
Stained glass, Gaaden, Lower Austria

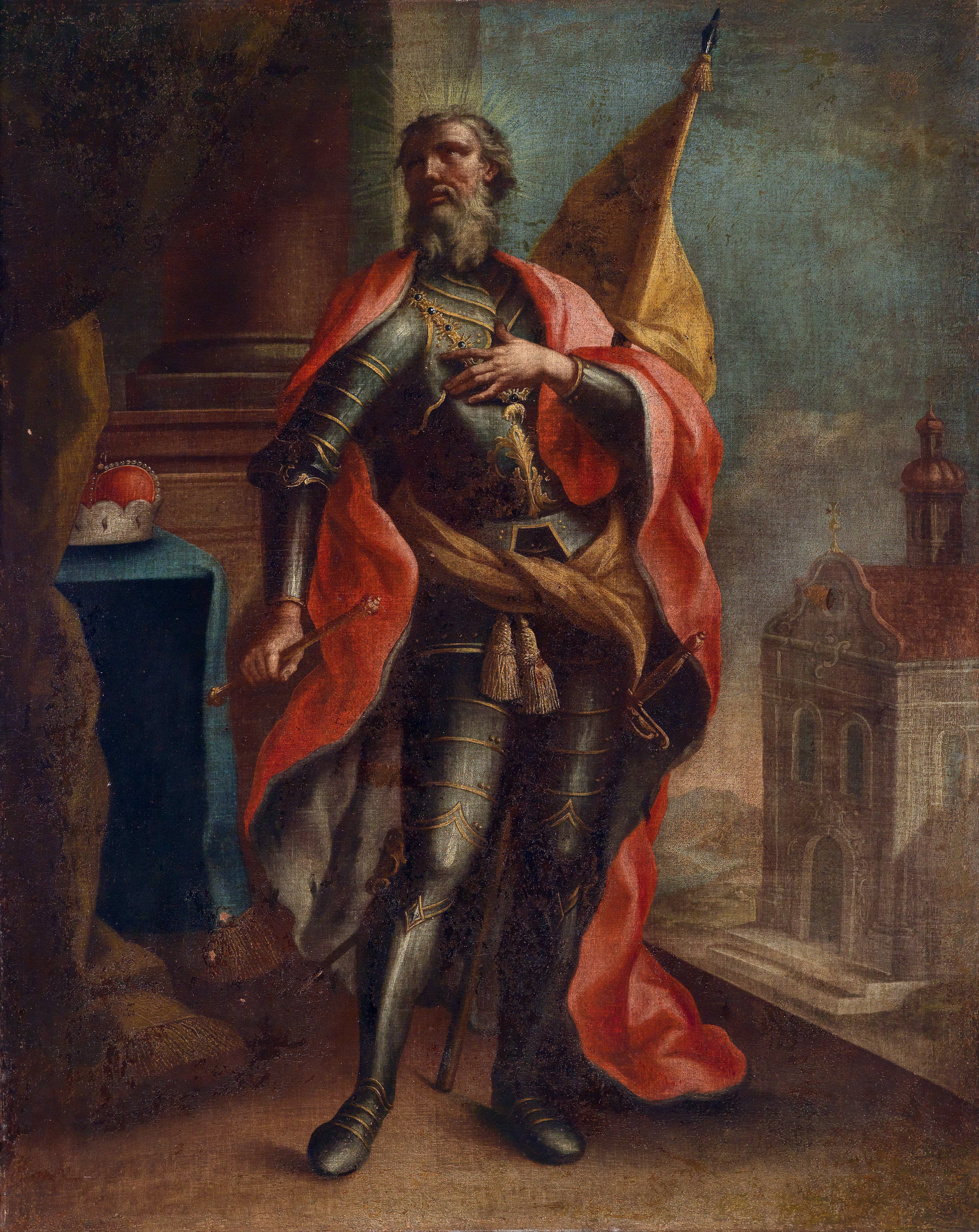
Österreichische Schule, eighteenth century

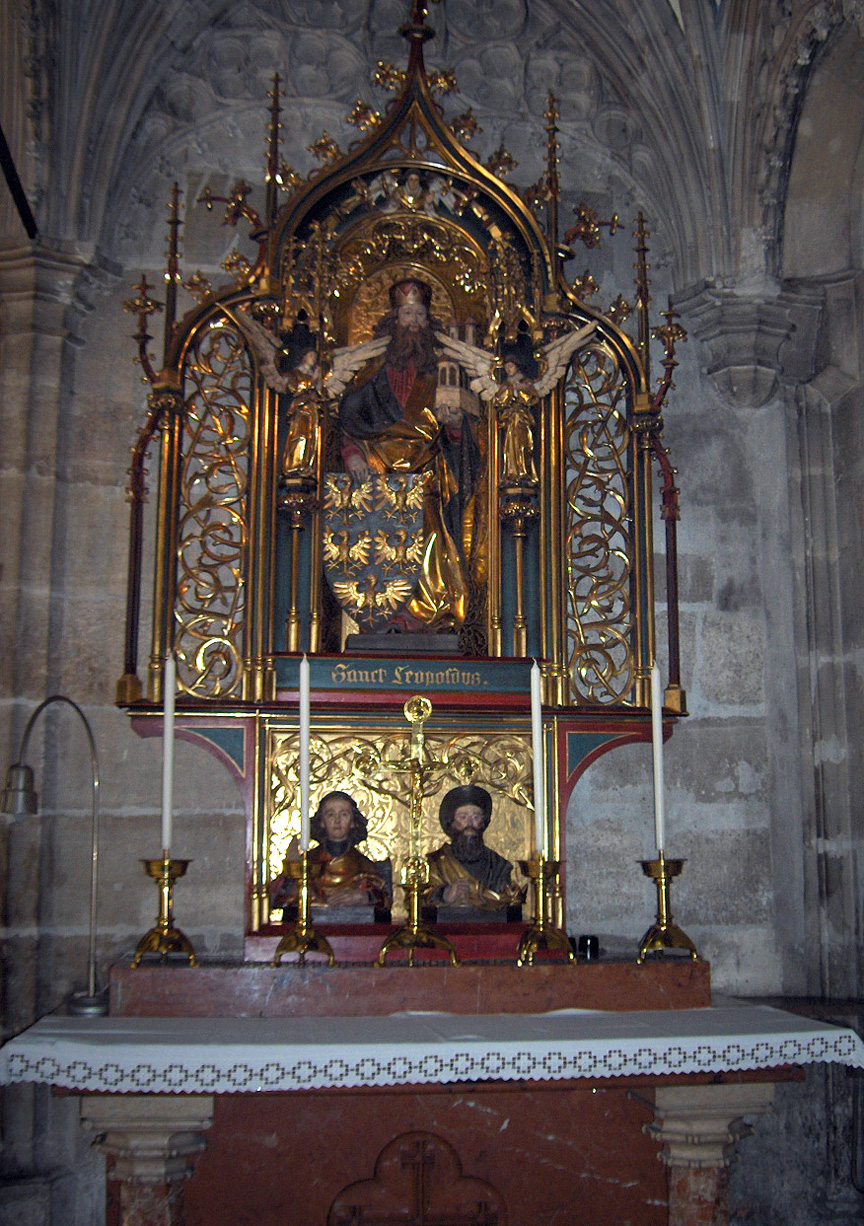
Saint Leopold Altar, Stephansdom

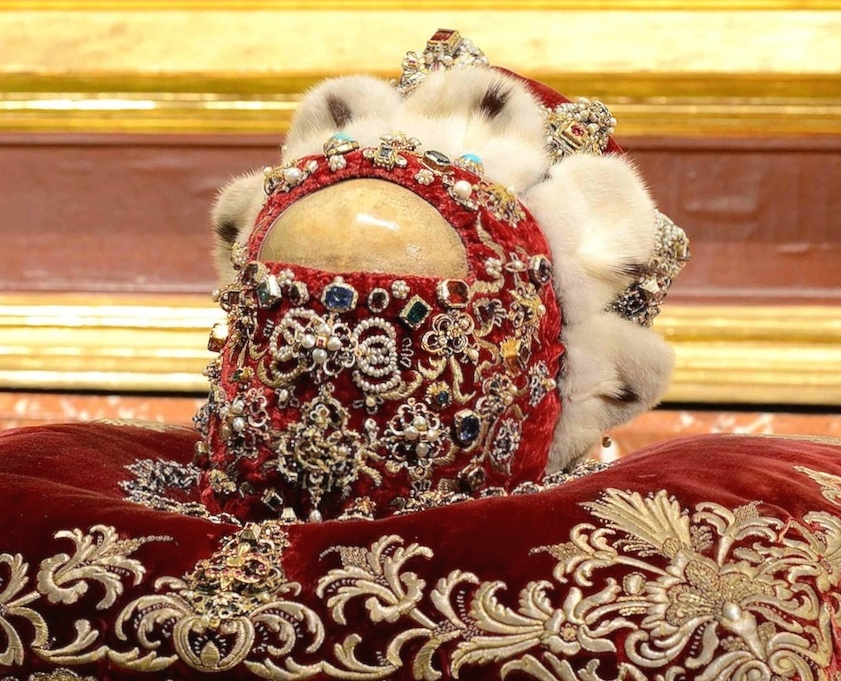
Saint Leopold's skull relic, Klosterneuburg Monastery

== See also ==
- List of rulers of Austria

== Sources ==
- Beller, Steven (2007). A Concise History of Austria. New York: Cambridge University Press. ISBN 978-0-521-47886-1.
- Brooke, Z. N. (1938). A History of Europe: From 911 to 1198. London: Methuen & Company Ltd. ISBN 978-1-4437-4070-8.
- Dopsch, Heinz (1999). Österreichische Geschichte 1122-1278. Vienna: Ueberreuter. ISBN 978-3-8000-3973-9.
- Freed, John (2016). Frederick Barbarossa: The Prince and the Myth. Yale University Press.
- Lechner, Karl (1976). Die Babenberger: Markgrafen und Herzoge von Österreich 976–1246. Vienna: Böhlau. ISBN 978-3-205-08508-9.
- Leeper, Alexander W. (1941). History of Medieval Austria. London: Oxford University Press. ISBN 978-0-404-15347-2.
- Lingelbach, William E. (1913). The History of Nations: Austria-Hungary. New York: P. F. Collier & Son Company. ASIN B000L3E368.
- Pohl, Walter (1995). Die Welt der Babenberger. Graz: Verlag Styria. ISBN 978-3-222-12334-4.
- Rickett, Richard (1985). A Brief Survey of Austrian History. Vienna: Prachner. ISBN 978-3-85367-001-9.
- Wegener, Wilhelm (1965). Genealogischen Tafeln zur mitteleuropäischen Geschichte. Vienna: Verlag Degener.

Leopold III, Margrave of Austria House of Babenberg Born: 1073 Died: 1136
Preceded by Leopold II	Margrave of Austria; 1095–1136	Succeeded by Leopold IV
