= Henry I of Mödling =

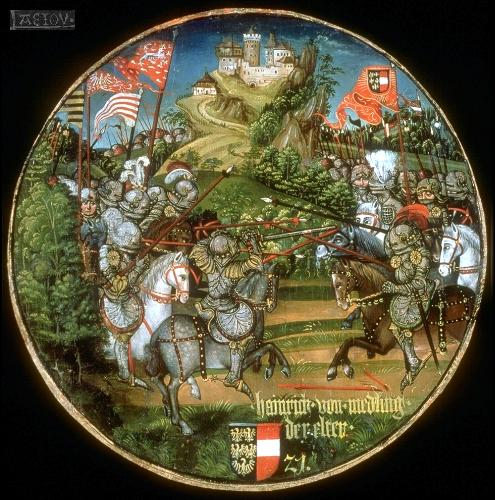
Duke Henry the Elder of Moedling.JPG

Henry of Mödling (1158 - 1223) known as the Elder was the "Duke" of Mödling from 1177 to 1223. He was the second son of Henry II, Duke of Austria. His lands spanned from Liesing to Piesting and Bruck an der Leitha. His first known use of the title 'Duke of Mödling' was from 1205.

== Life ==
Henry was knighted with his brother Leopold V in 1174.

On the death of their father, Henry II, Duke of Austria, he received the lands of Mödling from his brother, Leopold V, Duke of Austria around 1177. The castle of the same name became his Seat of Power.

He went to Vienna on the 25 August 1190 to see his brother off to join the Third Crusade, while he traveled to Italy to act as a representative of the Babenbergs and to attend the coronation of Henry VI, Holy Roman Emperor in Spring 1191.

He is known to have taken part in the German Crusade of 1197 with his nephew, Frederick I of Austria and Wolfger, Bishop of Passau. By 6 June 1197, he was at the Imperial court encampment at Castro St. Giovanni and a few days later, at the same time with Duke Frederick in Linaria. When they left Apulia to reach Sicily, they were encouraged further, after two ships sunk at sea, with the Abbots of Werd and Beuern. The Emperor now took full command and instructed Conrad, Archbishop of Mainz & Chancellor of Germany to lead the fleet over the Mediterranean. They sailed in early September 1197 and arrived in Acre a few weeks later.

His branch of the Babenberg line did not focus on matters of war, but became mostly interested in arts. His surname is somewhat confusing, as Mödling was not a separate duchy, but a subordinate-duchy ruled by the Babenbergs in Vienna. His territory, under his reign, experienced a marginal prosperity. During his government, he built Mödling castle in the 12th century. The most prominent guest was the minstrel Walther von der Vogelweide in 1219.

He married Richeza († 19 April 1182 ), daughter of Vladislaus II, Duke of Bohemia and had one son, Henry III, Duke of Mödling called the Younger.

He was buried with his brother, Leopold V of Austria and his nephew, Frederick I of Austria, at Heiligenkreuz Abbey.

== Sources ==
- Beller, Steven (2007). A Concise History of Austria. New York: Cambridge University Press. ISBN 978-0521478861.
- Brooke, Z. N. (1938). A History of Europe: From 911 to 1198. London: Methuen & Company Ltd. ISBN 978-1443740708.
- Dopsch, Heinz (1999). Österreichische Geschichte 1122-1278. Vienna: Ueberreuter. ISBN 3-8000-3973-7.
- Juritsch, Georg (1894). Geschichte der Babenberger und ihrer Länder, 976-1246. Innsbruck: Wagnerschen Universitätsbuchhandlung.
- Lechner, Karl (1976). Die Babenberger: Markgrafen und Herzoge von Österreich 976–1246. Vienna: Böhlau. ISBN 978-3205085089.
- Leeper, Alexander W. (1941). History of Medieval Austria. London: Oxford University Press. ISBN 978-0404153472.
- Lingelbach, William E. (1913). The History of Nations: Austria-Hungary. New York: P. F. Collier & Son Company. ASIN B000L3E368.
- Lyon, Jonathan R. (2013). Princely Brothers and Sisters: The Sibling Bond in German Politics, 1100-1250. Ithaca and London: Cornell University Press. ISBN 978-0801451300.
- Pohl, Walter (1995). Die Welt der Babenberger. Graz: Verlag Styria. ISBN 978-3222123344.
- Rickett, Richard (1985). A Brief Survey of Austrian History. Vienna: Prachner. ISBN 978-3853670019.
- Wegener, Wilhelm (1965). Genealogischen Tafeln zur mitteleuropäischen Geschichte. Vienna: Verlag Degener.
- Weller, Tobias (2004). Die Heiratspolitik des deutschen Hochadels im 12. Jahrhundert. Köln: Böhlau. ISBN 3-412-11104-X.
