= Dietmar II (archbishop of Salzburg) =

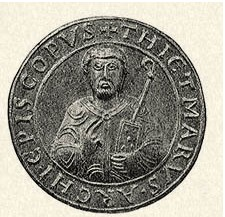
Seal bearing Dietmar's effigy

Dietmar II or Thietmar II was the archbishop of Salzburg from 1025 to 1041.

Dietmar's family background is unknown. He was elected sometime after 1 November 1025 and received episcopal ordination on 21 December. On 5 June 1026, Pope John XIX granted him the pallium and the right to carry a cross and ride a white horse on feast days. He died on 28 July 1041 and was buried in Salzburg Cathedral.

Dietmar's tradition book survives in manuscript, one of five such books from the medieval archbishops of Salzburg. Such books contain a record of diocesan acquisitions in land and serfs by donation or exchange. Called the Codex Thietmari, Dietmar's book contains a preface admonishing the heirs and successors of the donors against trying to rescind their donations.

The Codex is a valuable source for the social history of the region. Dietmar's is the second latest of the archiepiscopal tradition books and its transactions have markedly fewer witnesses on average than earlier ones. Likewise, its transactors are mostly members of the diocese's own familia, that is, its clerics and serfs, rather than noblemen. By Dietmar's time, this lower social class had coalesced into a new, more prominent class, the ministerialage. Dietmar drew from this group his advisors, who, rather than being tied to the land, travelled with him.

== Sources ==
- Eldevik, John (2012). Episcopal Power and Ecclesiastical Reform in the German Empire: Tithes, Lordship, and Community, 950–1150. Cambridge University Press.
- Fischer, Wilhelm (1916). Personal- und Amtsdaten der Erzbischöfe von Salzburg (798–1519). Richard Poettcke Nachfolger.
- Freed, John B. (1978). "The Formation of the Salzburg Ministerialage in the Tenth and Eleventh Centuries: An Example of Upward Social Mobility in the Early Middle Ages". Viator. 9: 67–102.
