= Leopold, Duke of Bavaria =

12th-century Bavarian nobleman

Leopold IV
- Margrave of Austria
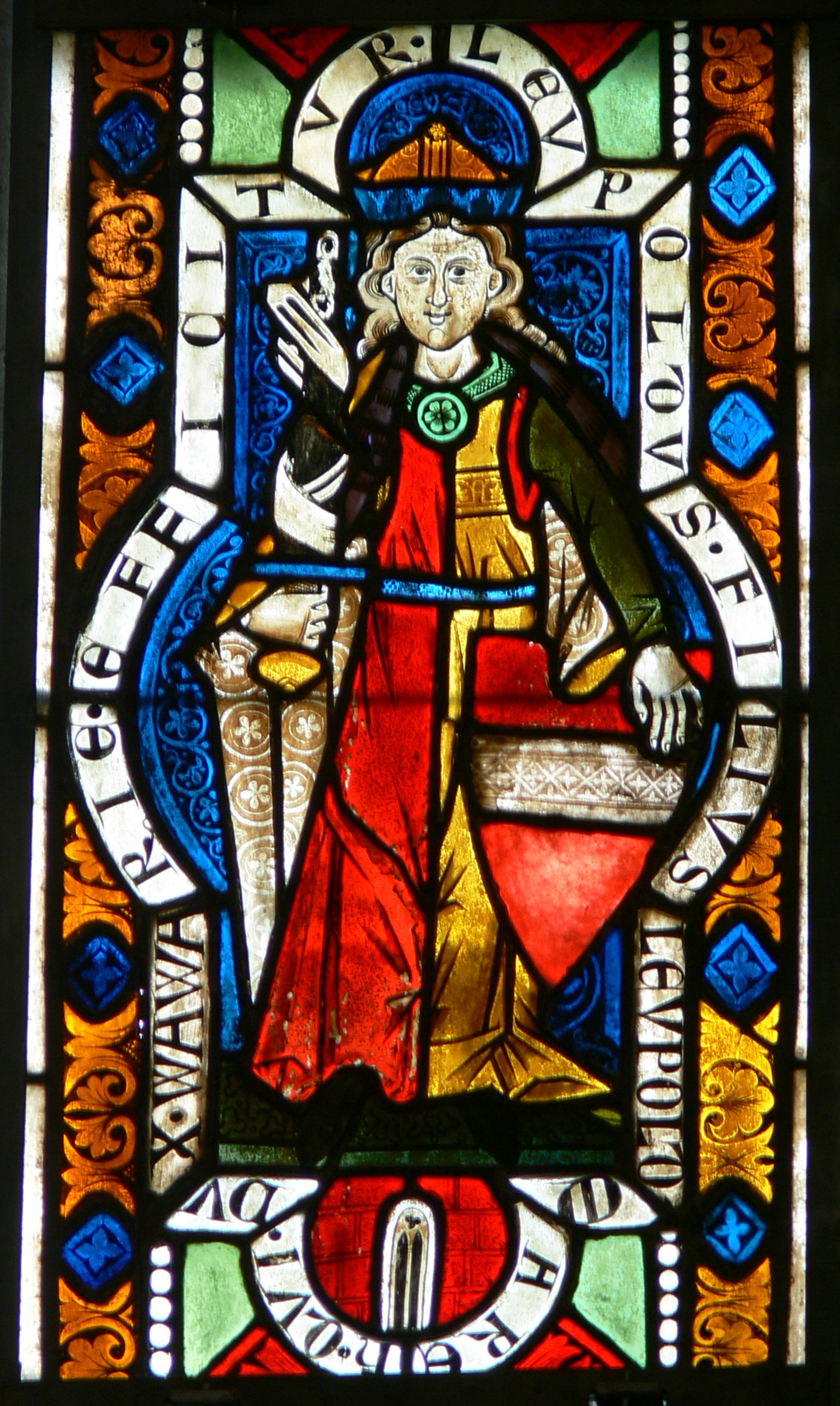
- Heiligenkreuz Abbey, Lower Austria, c. 1290
- Duke, Margrave: 1139–1141, 1136–1141
- Predecessor: Leopold III
- Successor: Henry II
- Born: 1108
- Died: 18 October 1141; Niederaltaich Abbey, Bavaria
- Buried: Heiligenkreuz Abbey
- Family: House of Babenberg
- Spouse: Maria of Bohemia
- Father: Leopold III
- Mother: Agnes of Germany

Leopold (German: Luitpold, c. 1108 – 18 October 1141), known as Leopold the Generous (German: Luitpold der Freigiebige), was Margrave of Austria (appearing in lists as Leopold IV) from 1136, and Duke of Bavaria from 1139 until his death in 1141.

== Biography ==
He was one of the younger sons of Margrave Leopold III, the Holy. It is not known why he was originally preferred to his brothers Adalbert and Henry Jasomirgott.

Through his mother Agnes, he was related to the Hohenstaufen. In the course of their struggle against the competing Welfen family, he was given the formerly Welfish Bavaria as a fief by Emperor Conrad III. He managed to maintain his position there, as his brother Otto was Bishop of Freising there.

The most important measure of his short reign was the Exchange of Mautern entered into with the Bishop of Passau in 1137. The bishop was given the St. Peter's Church in Vienna, while the Margrave received extended stretches of land from the bishop outside the city walls, with the notable exception of the territory where a new church was to be built, which was to become St. Stephen's Cathedral.

Leopold died unexpectedly at Niederaltaich Abbey in Bavaria and was succeeded by his brother Henry.

== See also ==
- List of rulers of Austria

Leopold, Duke of Bavaria House of Babenberg Born: 1108 Died: 18 October 1141
Regnal titles
Preceded by Leopold the Good	Margrave of Austria; 1136–1141	Succeeded by Henry Jasomirgott
Preceded by Henry the Proud	Duke of Bavaria; 1139–1141	Succeeded by Henry Jasomirgott
