= Schottenstift =

Benedictine monastery in Vienna, Austria

Coordinates: 48°12′44″N 16°21′52″E

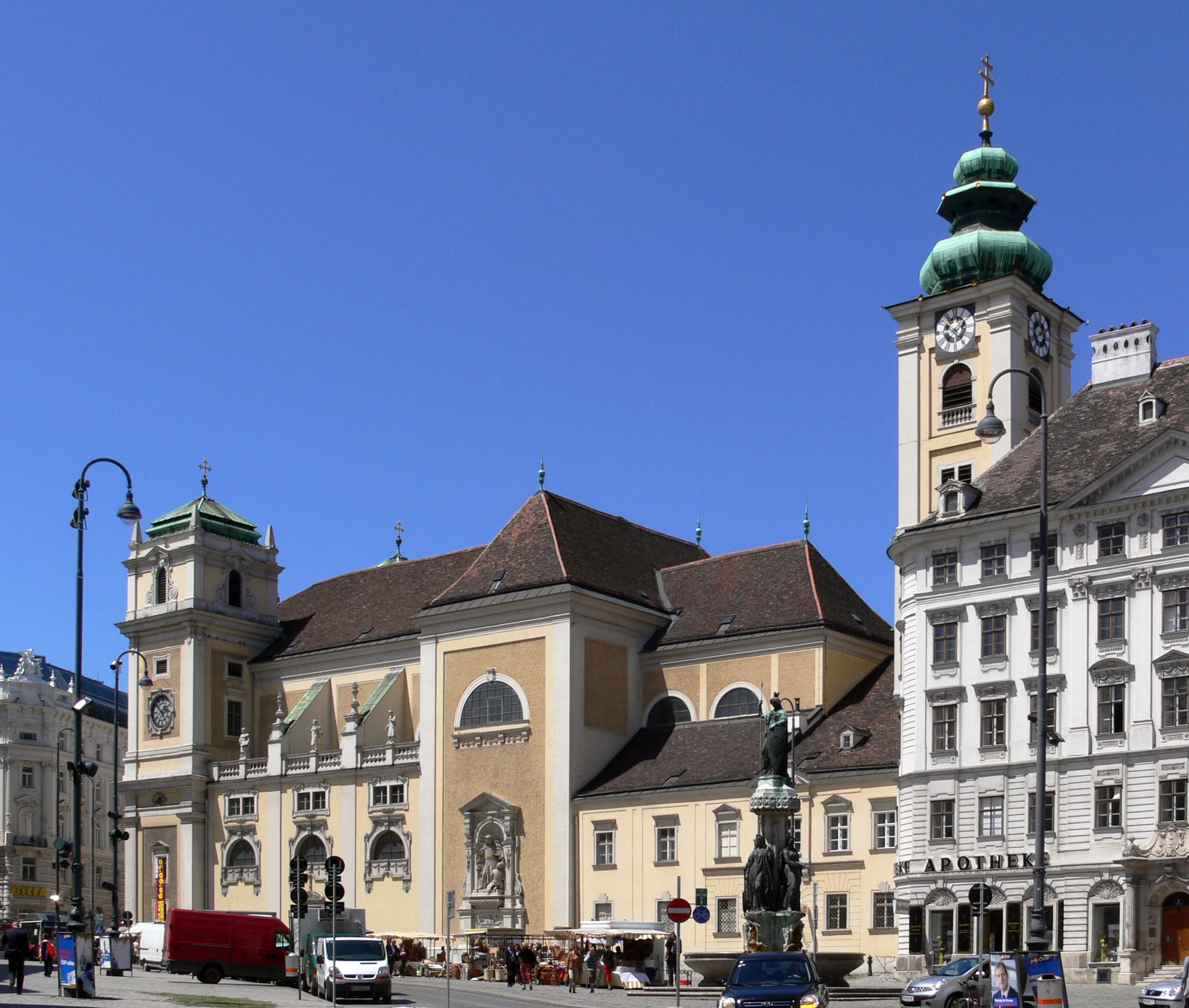
Schottenstift monastery in Vienna

The Schottenstift (English: Scottish Abbey), formally called Benediktinerabtei unserer Lieben Frau zu den Schotten (English: Benedictine Abbey of Our Dear Lady of the Scots), is a Catholic monastery founded in Vienna in 1155 when Henry II of Austria brought Irish monks to Vienna. The monks did not come directly from Ireland, but came instead from the Scots Monastery in Regensburg, Germany. Since 1625, the abbey has been a member of the Austrian Congregation, which since 1893 has been part of the Benedictine Confederation.

== History ==
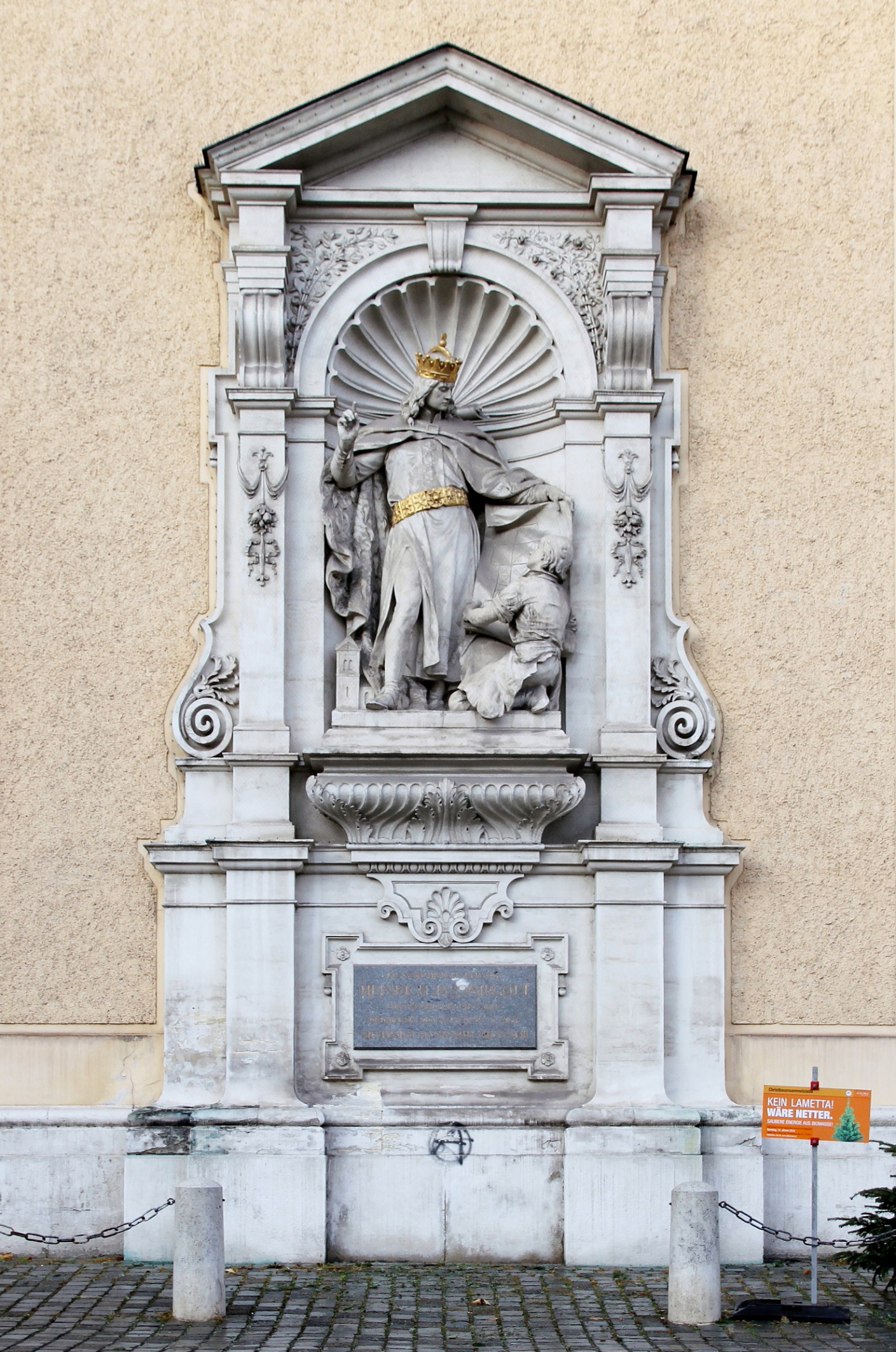
Monument of Henry II of Austria, called Jasomirgott

In the early Middle Ages, Irish monks were actively involved in missionary work. Ireland was known in Latin as "Scotia Major"; therefore, in German, Irish monks were called "Schotten" (Scots) or "Iroschotten". The monasteries that they founded were called "Schottenklöster". In the foundation documents of the Schottenstift, Henry II specified that it was to be occupied exclusively by these "Iroschotten" ("Solos elegimus Scottos").

Henry II was elevated from the rank of Margrave (Markgraf) to that of Duke (Herzog) in 1156. He moved his residence from Klosterneuburg to Vienna and required a monastery for his new city. In the Middle Ages, monasteries were not only places for prayer, but also and above all, repositories of knowledge. The foundation of a monastery gave the ruler support for his administration (for example, schools to educate competent scribes). It also provided a library, a hospice and old age home, architects, educated men, and priests to conduct services in the new ducal city. The "Schotten" would also be involved with the University of Vienna, which was founded in 1365.

Henry granted the new monastery extensive privileges. Construction of the first monastery started in 1160, and the structure was consecrated in 1200. The monastery was outside the city walls of Vienna. The monks also built a hospice for pilgrims and crusaders, who often passed through Vienna on their way to Jerusalem.

The first church was a three-aisled, Romanesque, pillar church with a single apse. Henry II was buried there upon his death in 1177.

A fire in the year 1276 destroyed the cloister, along with many other buildings in Vienna.

In 1418, Duke Albert V seized the cloister during the Melker Reform, an attempt to revive the original ideals of Benedictine monasticism, and settled a community of Benedictines in their place. These new residents, however, continued to be known as the "Schotten".

In the middle of the 15th century, the monastery was distinguished through the literary activities of its schoolmaster, Wolfgang Schmeltzl, and his successor, Johannes Rasch.

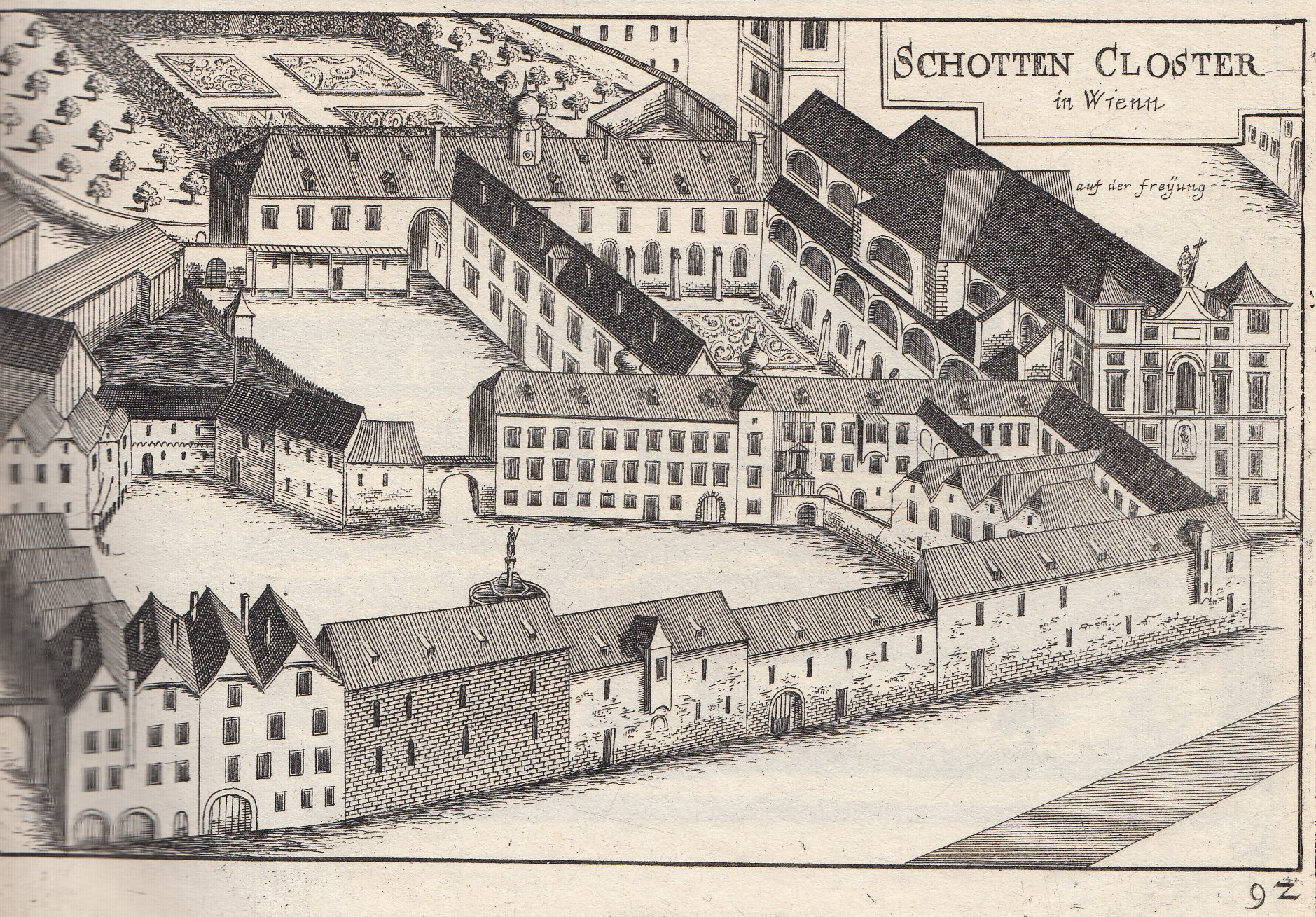
Schottenstift copper engraving, 1672

The collapse of the tower, struck by a lightning bolt in 1638, was seized as an opportunity to completely rebuild the church, a project undertaken by the architects Andrea d'Allio the Younger and Silvestro Carlone. The church was somewhat shortened, and the tower no longer stood directly beside the basilica. Joachim von Sandrart provided the church with a new altar piece, which today is kept in the prelates' hall. After the Turkish siege, the church was restored. As the Baroque west tower was barely higher than the façade itself, its extension has often been proposed, but this has never come to fruition.

Around 1700 the great Baroque musician Johann Fux was the organist at the Schottenstift.

In 1773 and 1774, a new priory, with school, was built by Andreas Zach in the grounds of an open air cemetery. As it resembled a piece of furniture, it became popularly known as the Schubladkastenhaus ("the chest-of-drawers house"). Directly next door stood the Hotel Römischer Kaiser, where the first public performance of a song by Franz Schubert was held.

In 1807 the Schottengymnasium, an institute for secondary education, was founded by imperial decree.

Around 1830, the auxiliary buildings of the Abbey, in particular those that bordered on the Freyung, were renovated and partially rebuilt by Joseph Kornhäusel.

In the 1880s the church was restored and partially renovated. From this period date the ceiling paintings by Julius Schmid, and a new high altar, built from sketches by Heinrich von Ferstel, with a mosaic by Michael Rieser.

In the court, there is a Schwarze Muttergottes (a "Black Madonna"), designed in 1825 by Peter Nobile. The fountain, with a statue of Henry II, is the work of Sebastian Wagner.

== Museum ==
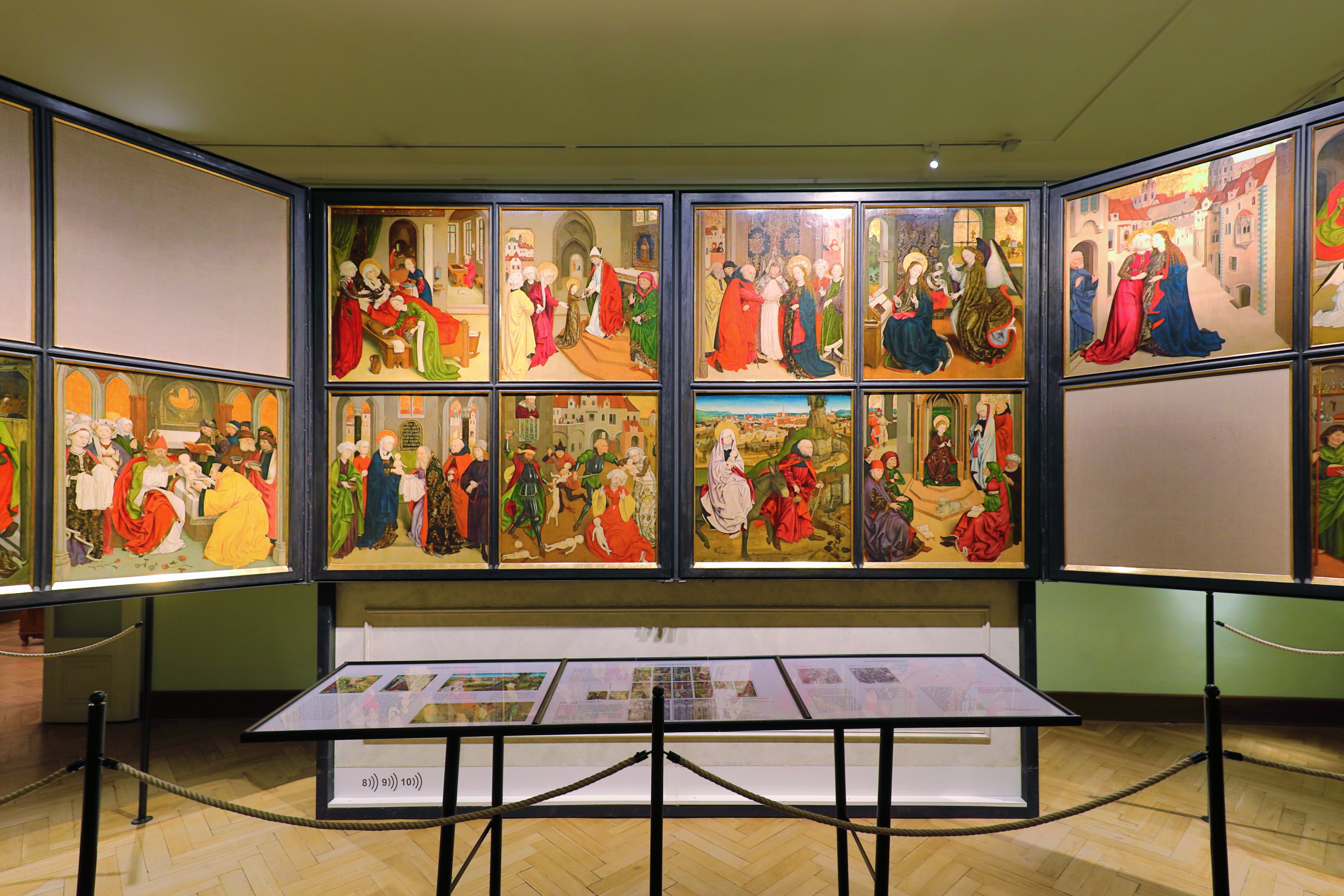
Schottenmeisteraltar from ca. 1470

The museum has been reinstalled twice in recent history, in 1994/95 and in 2004/5. It contains, among other notable items, the Schottenmeisteraltar from ca. 1470, which is not only a significant work of late Gothic art, but also an important historical source, on account of its views of the city.

Open on Thursday until Friday, 11 am to 5 pm, and Saturday, 11 am to 4.30 pm. Guided Tour on Saturday, 2.30 pm (church, crypt, library and museum).

== Location ==
The Schottenstift is located on the Freyung (Freyung 6, A-1010 Wien) in Vienna, Austria.
