= Adalbert III of Bohemia =

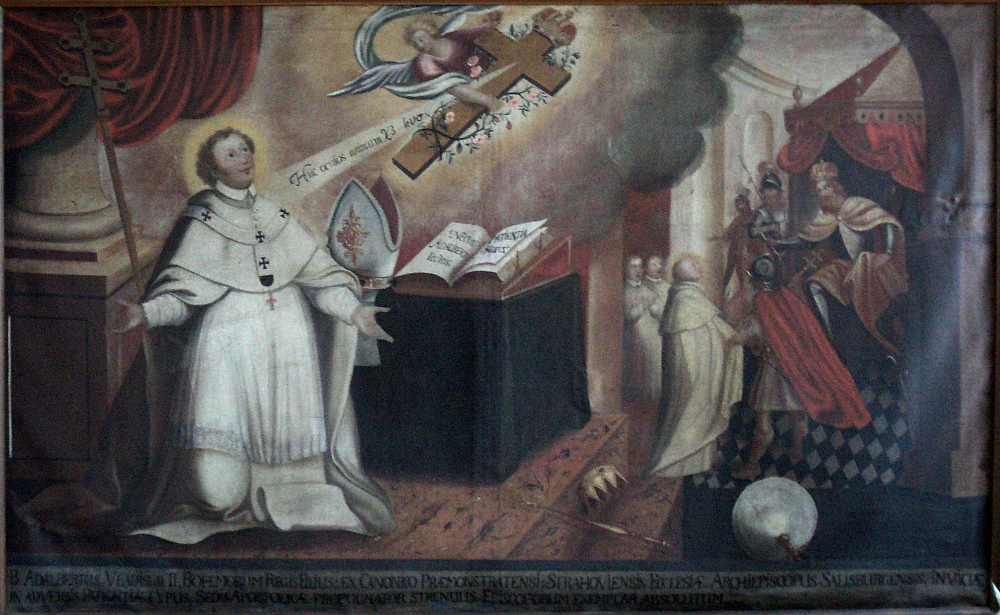
Adalbert III, Archbishop of Salzburg

Adalbert III of Bohemia (1145 – 8 April 1200), also called Vojtěch in his native Bohemia, was Archbishop of Salzburg between 1168 and 1177 and then again between 1183 and 1200. His reign is marked significantly by the struggle with Emperor Frederick I Barbarossa. He is listed as a Blessed of the Premonstratensians.

He was a son of Vladislaus II, Duke of Bohemia, and Gertrude of Babenberg, raised by Frederick I Barbarossa (his first cousin). He lived as a deacon in the Bohemian Strahov Monastery (Latinized: Mons Sion) in Prague. After the death of his maternal uncle, Archbishop Conrad II of Salzburg, on 28 September 1168, Adalbert lived at first with Ulrich II of Aquileia, then as Provost of Mělník in Bohemia, honored by Papal legation, but without influence.

== Literature ==
- Meiller: Regesta archiepiscoporum Salisburgensium.
- Hans Prutz: Adalbert III.. In: Allgemeine Deutsche Biographie (ADB). Band 1, Duncker & Humblot, Leipzig 1875, S. 69–71.
- W. Schmidt: Die Stellung der Erzbischöfe von Salzburg u. das Erzstift von Salzburg zu Kirche und Reich unter K. Friedrich I. Wien 1865.
- Andreas Bigelmair (1953). "Adalbert III.". Neue Deutsche Biographie (in German). Vol. 1. Berlin: Duncker & Humblot. pp. 46–47. (full text online).
- Friedrich Wilhelm Bautz (1975). "ADALBERT III.". In Bautz, Friedrich Wilhelm (ed.). Biographisch-Bibliographisches Kirchenlexikon (BBKL) (in German). Vol. 1. Hamm: Bautz. col. 27. ISBN 3-88309-013-1.
