= Vladislaus II, Duke and King of Bohemia =

Duke of Bohemia (r. 1140–58); King of Bohemia (r. 1158–73)

Vladislaus II & I
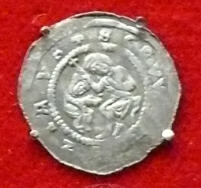
- Denar of Vladislaus II

Duke of Bohemia
- Reign: February 1140 – 11 January 1158
- Predecessor: Soběslav I
- Successor: himself as king

King of Bohemia
- Reign: 11 January 1158 – 1173
- Coronation: 11 January 1158, Regensburg
- Predecessor: himself as duke
- Successor: Frederick as duke
- Born: c. 1110; Bohemia
- Died: 18 January 1174 (aged 63–64); Meerane, Germany
- Burial: Prague, Strahov Abbey
- Spouse: Gertrude of Babenberg; Judith of Thuringia
- Issue Detail: Frederick, Duke of Bohemia; Adalbert III, Archbishop of Salzburg; Ottokar I, King of Bohemia; Vladislaus III, Duke of Bohemia
- Dynasty: Přemyslid
- Father: Vladislaus I, Duke of Bohemia
- Mother: Richeza of Berg

Vladislaus II or Vladislav II (c. 1110 – 18 January 1174) was the Duke of Bohemia from 1140 and then King of Bohemia (as Vladislaus I) from 1158 until his abdication in 1173. He was the second Bohemian king after Vratislaus II, but in neither case was the royal title hereditary.

Vladislav was the son of Vladislav I and Richeza of Berg. He was married twice, first to Gertrude of Babenberg and then to Judith of Thuringia.

== Reign ==
=== Duke ===
He was an adventurous youth. Having no expectation of reaching the throne during the reign of his uncle Soběslav I, he moved to Bavaria. He returned at the death of Soběslav in 1140 and, with the help of his brother-in-law, the king of Germany, Conrad III, he was elected Duke of Bohemia by the Bohemian nobility.

At first, Vladislav had to contend with the claims of his cousin, the son of Soběslav who was also named Vladislav. At Soběslav's request, Emperor Lothair II recognised the rights of his son at the Diet of Bamberg in May 1138. Then, in June, the nobility affirmed them at Sadská. Another diet at Bamberg confirmed the succession of the son of Vladislav, however, in April 1140. The local dukes Conrad II of Znojmo, Vratislaus II of Brno, and Otto III of Olomouc, gave him trouble. They were excommunicated by Jindřich Zdík, bishop of Olomouc, who was then driven out of his diocese. The territorial dukes then defeated Vladislav through treason at Vysoká on 22 April 1142, but their siege of Prague failed. Vladislav kept his throne with the assistance of Conrad III of Germany, whose half-sister Gertrude of Babenberg he married.

In 1147, Vladislav accompanied Conrad on the Second Crusade, but halted his march at Constantinople and subsequently returned. On his way back to Bohemia, he passed through Kiev and Kraków.

After the election of Frederick Barbarossa to succeed Conrad in 1152, Vladislav was summoned to attend a diet at Merseburg in May 1152. According to Vincent of Prague, he refused and sent Bishop Daniel of Prague as his representative instead. In October 1155, he met Frederick near the Bohemian border. He attended Frederick's wedding to Beatrice of Burgundy in Würzburg in June 1156. It was there that he and Frederick reached an agreement whereby Vladislav would take part in Frederick's upcoming Italian expedition and Frederick would raise Vladislav to the kingship.

=== King ===
On 11 January 1158, the secret arrangement of 1156 was put into effect at an imperial diet in Regensburg. Frederick crowned Vladislav with a diadem (called by the chroniclers a diadema or circulus) evidently distinct from his own imperial crown. On 18 January he issued a privilege to Vladislav regulating his use of the crown and other insignia. Frederick made the grant of the royal title and crown in perpetuity, but they were not used after Vladislav's abdication. Upon the latter's return to Bohemia, the aristocracy strongly opposed both his commitment to campaigning in Italy and his unilateral amendment to the Bohemian constitution. They acquiesced only when he agreed to assume the costs of the Italian expedition himself.

He was also invested with Upper Lusatia at Regensburg. He duly accompanied Frederick to Milan in 1158. His coronation was celebrated in a second ceremony at Milan on 8 September. Vladislav was a firm ally of the emperor Frederick. During the Italian expeditions of 1161, 1162, and 1167, Vladislav entrusted the command of the Czech contingent to his brother Duke Děpold I of Jamnitz and his son Frederick.

After the revolt of the Moravian dukes, Vladislav gradually took control of the strongholds of Moravia: Brno with the death of Vratislaus II in 1156, Olomouc with the death of Otto III (in spite of the claims of Soběslav, the son of Duke Soběslav, who was imprisoned), and finally Znojmo with the death of Conrad II. Vladislav also intervened in Hungary in 1163 on behalf of the emperor. He married his second son, Sviatopluk, to a Hungarian princess and had diplomatic contact with Emperor Manuel I Comnenus of Byzantium.

In 1167, Daniel I, bishop of Prague since 1148 and Vladislav's greatest advisor, died. As a result, relations between the kings of Bohemia and Germany were strained. When his son Adalbert (Vojtěch) III became archbishop of Salzburg in 1169, the emperor suspected him of supporting Pope Alexander III.

== Abdication ==
Eager to impose his son Frederick on the throne of the still-elective duchy of Bohemia, he abdicated in 1173 without either the consensus of the Bohemian noblemen or the emperor's permission. Frederick kept the throne for less than one year before yielding his place to Soběslav II, the elder son of Soběslav I.

Vladislav lived in Thuringia in the lands of his second wife, where he died in January 1174. He was buried in the Cathedral of Meissen. His reign was marked by the founding of numerous Premonstratensian and Cistercian abbeys in Bohemia, as well as the completion of a stone bridge across the Vltava River in Prague: the construction was named the Judith Bridge in honour of Vladislav's second wife. The bridge was destroyed in a flood in 1342 and the Charles Bridge was built in its place.

== Family and children ==
By his first wife, Gertrude of Babenberg (died 4 August 1150), he had the following issue:

- a daughter (Richeza?), married Yaroslav II of Kiev
- Frederick, successor
- Sviatopluk, married a daughter of Géza II of Hungary
- Vojtěch, Archbishop of Salzburg as Adalbert III of Bohemia
- Agnes (died 7 June 1228), abbess of St George of Prague

By his second wife, Judith of Thuringia (married 1155), daughter of Louis I, Landgrave of Thuringia, he had the following issue:

- Ottokar, later king of Bohemia, the first of a hereditary line
- Vladislaus, later duke of Bohemia as Vladislaus III
- Richeza (died 19 April 1182), married Henry I, Duke of Mödling, son of Henry II, Duke of Austria and had one son, Henry the Younger

Regnal titles
Preceded by Soběslav I	Duke of Bohemia; 1140–1158	Vacant Title next held by Frederick
Vacant Title last held by Vratislaus II	King of Bohemia; 1158–1172	Vacant Title next held by Ottokar I
