= Otto of Freising =

Bishop of Freising from 1138 to 1158

- Bishop of Freising
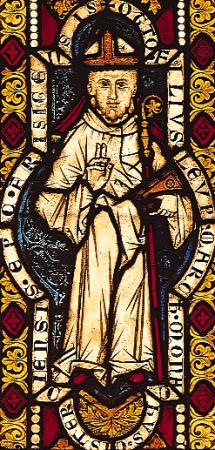
- Otto of Freising, as depicted on a 13th-century stained glass window in the Cistercian Abbey of Heiligenkreuz, Austria
- Diocese: Freising
- In office: 1138 – 1158
- Predecessor: Heinrich of Freising
- Successor: Albert of Harthausen

Personal details
- Born: c. 1111 Klosterneuburg
- Died: 22 September 1158 Morimond
- Denomination: Roman Catholic

Otto of Freising (Latin: Otto Frisingensis; c. 1111 – 22 September 1158) was a German churchman of the Cistercian order and chronicled at least two texts which carry valuable information on the political history of his own time. He was the bishop of Freising from 1138. Otto participated in the Second Crusade; he lived through the journey and reached Jerusalem, and later returned to Bavaria in the late 1140s, living for another decade back in Europe.

== Life ==
Otto was born in Klosterneuburg as the fifth son of Leopold III, margrave of Austria, by his wife Agnes of Waiblingen, daughter of Emperor Henry IV. By her first husband, Frederick I of Hohenstaufen, duke of Swabia, Agnes was the mother of the German king Conrad III and grandmother of the emperor Frederick Barbarossa. Otto's sister, Judith of Babenberg, was married to William V, Marquis of Montferrat. Otto was thus related to the most powerful families in Germany and northern Italy.

The records of his life are scanty and the dates somewhat uncertain. He studied in Paris, where he took an especial interest in philosophy. He is said to have been one of the first to introduce the philosophy of Aristotle into Germany and served as provost of a new foundation in Austria.

Having entered the Cistercian order, Otto convinced his father to found Heiligenkreuz Abbey in 1133, thus bringing literacy and sophisticated agriculture (including wine making) to the region that would become Vienna. He became abbot of the Cistercian monastery of Morimond in Burgundy about 1136, and soon afterwards was elected bishop of Freising. This diocese, and indeed the whole of Bavaria, was then disturbed by the feud between the Welfs and the Hohenstaufen, and the church was in a deplorable condition; but a great improvement was brought about by the new bishop in both ecclesiastical and secular matters.

In 1147 Otto took part in the disastrous Second Crusade. The section of the crusading army led by the bishop was decimated, but Otto reached Jerusalem and returned to Bavaria in 1148 or 1149. He enjoyed the favour of Conrad's successor Frederick I, was probably instrumental in settling the dispute over the duchy of Bavaria in 1156, and was present at the famous diet of Besançon in 1157. Otto mentions that Frederick I ushered in a new age of peace following years of instability and civil war.

Still retaining the habit of a Cistercian monk, he died at Morimond on 22 September 1158. In 1857 a statue of the bishop was erected at Freising, Bavaria.

== Works ==
Otto is best known for two major historical works:

=== Chronica de duabus civitatibus ===
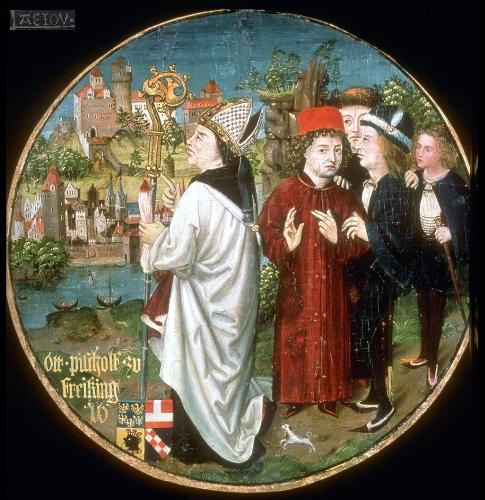
Otto, painted by Hans Part around 1490; in the picture, Bishop Otto is looking out at Freising Cathedral from the east bank of the Isar River.

The first is his work Chronica sive Historia de duabus civitatibus (Chronicle or History of the Two Cities), an eight-book historical and philosophical treatise that to some extent follows the intellectual framework laid down by Augustine of Hippo and Paul Orosius. Written during the German Civil War (1143–1145), it draws a parallel between Jerusalem and Babel, the Heavenly City and the Earthly City, while also containing a wealth of valuable information about the history of his era. Esteemed highly by his contemporaries, this chronicle covers events up to the year 1146; from that point onward to 1209, it was continued by Saint Blasius of Blaubeuren Abbey in the Black Forest (d. 1223). In the Chronica, Otto recounts his meeting with Bishop Hugh of Jabala, who told him of a Nestorian Christian king in the East called Prester John. It was hoped that this monarch would bring relief to the Crusader states, and this marks the first documented reference to Prester John.

The text elaborates on an era of harmony between imperial and ecclesiastical authority, tracing its origins to the Christianization of Rome. Rome is portrayed as the fourth and final world empire, after which power passed to the Greeks (the Byzantines), then to the Franks (Francia), and later to the Germans (East Francia). He also notes that Conrad III of Germany was the 93rd emperor since Augustus, and Frederick I, Holy Roman Emperor the 94th. However, this unity was shattered by Pope Gregory VII’s unexpected excommunication of Emperor Henry IV, Holy Roman Emperor amid the Investiture Controversy of 1075. Thus, this event would usher in the seventh and final age of human history—a period characterized by constant crises, preceding the arrival of the Antichrist. This forms the central theme of the eighth and final book of the Chronica.

=== Gesta Friderici Imperatoris ===
More famously, there is Otto’s work Gesta Friderici imperatoris (Deeds of Emperor Frederick). Commissioned by Frederick I, the book opens with a letter from the emperor to the author.

Composed of four books, Gesta has its first two volumes written by Otto himself, while the remaining two (or parts thereof) are attributed to his pupil Ragewin (or Rahewin). Some scholars argue that Otto was also the author of the earlier sections of the third and fourth books.

Opening with the conflict between Pope Gregory VII and Emperor Henry IV, the first book traces history up to the death of Conrad III in 1152. Its scope extends beyond German affairs, as the author digresses to recount the preaching of Bernard of Clairvaux, his zeal against heresy, and the condemnation of Pierre Abélard; he also delves into discussions of philosophy and theology.

The second book begins with Frederick I’s election in 1152, detailing the first five years of his reign, with a particular focus on his campaigns in Italy. From this point onward (1156), Ragewin took over the writing.

Otto’s command of Latin was exceptional, and despite a slight bias toward the Hohenstaufens and minor inaccuracies, Gesta has been described as a model of historical composition.

== Notes and references ==
=== Attribution ===
Catholic Church titles
Preceded by Heinrich of Freising	Bishop of Friesing; 1138 – 1158	Succeeded by Albert of Harthausen
