= May 12 =

May 12 this year in various calendars
- Tuesday, 12 May 2026
Akan	Nwonabene
Armenian	26 Mareri 1475
Aztec	Ochpaniztli 2, 6 Itzcuintli
Babylonian	24 Nisanu, 2337 SE
Balinese pawukon	Luang, Pepet, Beteng, Laba, Wage, Aryang, Anggara of Gumbreg, Brahma, Tulus, Raja
Bengali	29 Boisakh, BS 1433
Chinese	Yang Fire Dog・Encampment Mansion; Fire Horse Year, Month 3, Day 26 (Lixia, 9 days until Xiaoman)
Common Era	12 May 2026 CE
Coptic	4 Pashons, AM 1742
Egyptian	26 Thoth, 2775 NE
Ethiopian	4 Genbot, 2018 Amätä Məhrät
French Republican	Décade III, Tridi de Floréal de l'Année 234 de la République
Gregorian	12 May, AD 2026
Hebrew	25 Iyar, AM 5786; Omer 40
Hindu	Pūrvabhādrapada・Vaidhṛti; Solar: 29 Vaiśākha, 1948 SE; Lunisolar: Daśamī, Kṛishna pakṣa of Vaiśākha, 2083 VE; Rāudra・5127 KY・1,872,707
Icelandic	Þriðjudagur, 20 Harpa 2026
Islamic	25 Dhu al-Qi'dah, AH 1447 (using tabular method)
ISO week date	2026-W20-2
Japanese	26 Yayoi, Reiwa 8 (Rikka, 9 days until Shōman)
Julian	29 April, AD 2026 (AM 7534)
Julian day	2461173
Korean	26 Yongdal, 4359 DE
Maya	13.0.13.10.10; 3 Zip, 6 Oc
Roman	ante diem III Kalendas Maias, MMDCCLXXIX AUC
Solar Hijri	22 Ordibehesht, SH 1405
Tibetan	25 nag pa, me pho rta 2153 or 1772 or 1000

<<	May					>>
Su	Mo	Tu	We	Th	Fr	Sa
					1	2
3	4	5	6	7	8	9
10	11	12	13	14	15	16
17	18	19	20	21	22	23
24	25	26	27	28	29	30
31
2026

May 12 in recent years
2026 (Tuesday)
2025 (Monday)
2024 (Sunday)
2023 (Friday)
2022 (Thursday)
2021 (Wednesday)
2020 (Tuesday)
2019 (Sunday)
2018 (Saturday)
2017 (Friday)

May 12 is the 132nd day of the year (133rd in leap years) in the Gregorian calendar; 233 days remain until the end of the year.

== Events ==
=== Pre-1600 ===
- 113 – Roman emperor Trajan dedicates a column celebrating and depicting his victory over the Dacians.
- 254 – Pope Stephen I succeeds Pope Lucius I, becoming the 23rd pope of the Catholic Church, and immediately takes a stand against Novatianism.
- 907 – Zhu Wen forces Emperor Ai into abdicating, ending the Tang dynasty after nearly three hundred years of rule.
- 1157 – A church council presided over by Byzantine emperor Manuel I Komnenos in the Palace of Blachernae investigates the orthodoxy of the patriarch of Antioch, Soterichos Panteugenos.
- 1191 – Richard I of England marries Berengaria of Navarre in Cyprus; she is crowned Queen consort of England the same day.
- 1328 – Antipope Nicholas V, a claimant to the papacy, is consecrated in Rome by the Bishop of Venice.
- 1364 – Jagiellonian University, the oldest university in Poland, is founded in Kraków.
- 1497 – Pope Alexander VI excommunicates Girolamo Savonarola.
- 1510 – The Prince of Anhua rebellion begins when Zhu Zhifan kills all the officials invited to a banquet and declares his intent on ousting the powerful Ming dynasty eunuch Liu Jin during the reign of the Zhengde Emperor.
- 1551 – National University of San Marcos, the oldest university in the Americas, is founded in Lima, Peru.
- 1588 – French Wars of Religion: Henry III of France flees Paris after Henry I, Duke of Guise, enters the city and a spontaneous uprising occurs.
- 1593 – London playwright Thomas Kyd is arrested and tortured by the Privy Council for libel.

=== 1601–1900 ===
- 1743 – Maria Theresa of Austria is crowned Queen of Bohemia after defeating her rival, Charles VII, Holy Roman Emperor.
- 1778 – Heinrich XI, count of the Principality of Reuss-Greiz, is elevated to Prince by Joseph II, Holy Roman Emperor.
- 1780 – American Revolutionary War: In the largest defeat of the Continental Army, Charleston, South Carolina is taken by British forces.
- 1797 – War of the First Coalition: Napoleon Bonaparte conquers Venice.
- 1808 – Finnish War: Swedish-Finnish troops, led by Captain Karl Wilhelm Malmi, conquer the city of Kuopio from Russians after the Battle of Kuopio.
- 1809 – British contingents under Arthur Wellesley force a French army under general Soult to retreat in the battle of Oporto.
- 1821 – The first major battle of the Greek War of Independence against the Turks is fought in Valtetsi.
- 1846 – The Donner Party of pioneers departs Independence, Missouri for California, on what will become a year-long journey of hardship and cannibalism.
- 1862 – American Civil War: Union Army troops occupy Baton Rouge, Louisiana.
- 1863 – American Civil War: Battle of Raymond: Two divisions of James B. McPherson's XVII Corps turn the left wing of Confederate General John C. Pemberton's defensive line on Fourteen Mile Creek, opening up the interior of Mississippi to the Union Army during the Vicksburg Campaign.
- 1864 – American Civil War: The Battle of Spotsylvania Court House: Union troops assault a Confederate salient known as the "Mule Shoe", with some of the fiercest fighting of the war, much of it hand-to-hand combat, occurring at "the Bloody Angle" on the northwest.
- 1865 – American Civil War: The Battle of Palmito Ranch: The first day of the last major land action to take place during the Civil War, resulting in a Confederate victory.
- 1870 – The Manitoba Act is given the Royal Assent, paving the way for Manitoba to become a province of Canada on July 15.
- 1881 – In North Africa, Tunisia becomes a French protectorate.
- 1885 – North-West Rebellion: The four-day Battle of Batoche, pitting rebel Métis against the Canadian government, comes to an end with a decisive rebel defeat.

=== 1901–present ===
- 1926 – The Italian-built airship Norge becomes the first vessel to fly over the North Pole.
- 1926 – The 1926 United Kingdom general strike ends.
- 1932 – Ten weeks after his abduction, Charles Jr., the infant son of Charles Lindbergh, is found dead near Hopewell, New Jersey, just a few miles from the Lindberghs' home.
- 1933 – The Agricultural Adjustment Act, which restricts agricultural production through government purchase of livestock for slaughter and paying subsidies to farmers when they remove land from planting, is signed into law by President Franklin D. Roosevelt.
- 1933 – President Roosevelt signs legislation creating the Federal Emergency Relief Administration, the predecessor of the Federal Emergency Management Agency.
- 1937 – King George VI and Queen Elizabeth of the United Kingdom are crowned in Westminster Abbey.
- 1941 – Konrad Zuse presents the Z3, the world's first working programmable, fully automatic computer, in Berlin.
- 1942 – World War II: Second Battle of Kharkov: In eastern Ukraine, Red Army forces under Marshal Semyon Timoshenko launch a major offensive from the Izium bridgehead, only to be encircled and destroyed by the troops of Army Group South two weeks later.
- 1942 – World War II: The U.S. tanker SS Virginia is torpedoed in the mouth of the Mississippi River by the German submarine U-507.
- 1949 – Cold War: The Soviet Union lifts its blockade of Berlin.
- 1965 – The Soviet spacecraft Luna 5 crashes on the Moon.
- 1968 – Vietnam War: North Vietnamese and Viet Cong forces attack Australian troops defending Fire Support Base Coral.
- 1975 – Indochina Wars: Democratic Kampuchea naval forces capture the SS Mayaguez.
- 1978 – In Zaire, rebels occupy the city of Kolwezi, the mining center of the province of Shaba (now known as Katanga); the local government asks the US, France and Belgium to restore order.
- 1982 – During a procession outside the shrine of the Virgin Mary in Fátima, Portugal, security guards overpower Juan María Fernández y Krohn before he can attack Pope John Paul II with a bayonet.
- 1989 – The San Bernardino train disaster kills four people, only to be followed a week later by an underground gasoline pipeline explosion, which kills two more people.
- 2002 – Former US President Jimmy Carter arrives in Cuba for a five-day visit with Fidel Castro, becoming the first President of the United States, in or out of office, to visit the island since the Cuban Revolution.
- 2003 – The Riyadh compound bombings in Saudi Arabia, carried out by al-Qaeda, kill 39 people.
- 2006 – Mass unrest by the Primeiro Comando da Capital begins in São Paulo (Brazil), leaving at least 150 dead.
- 2006 – Iranian Azeris interpret a cartoon published in an Iranian magazine as insulting, resulting in massive riots throughout the country.
- 2008 – An earthquake (measuring around 8.0 magnitude) occurs in Sichuan, China, killing over 69,000 people.
- 2008 – U.S. Immigration and Customs Enforcement conducts the largest-ever raid of a workplace in Postville, Iowa, arresting nearly 400 immigrants for identity theft and document fraud.
- 2010 – Afriqiyah Airways Flight 771 crashes on final approach to Tripoli International Airport in Tripoli, Libya, killing 103 out of the 104 people on board.
- 2015 – A train derailment in Philadelphia, United States, kills eight people and injures more than 200.
- 2015 – Massive Nepal earthquake kills 218 people and injures more than 3,500.
- 2017 – The WannaCry ransomware attack impacts over 400,000 computers worldwide, targeting computers of the United Kingdom's National Health Services and Telefónica computers.
- 2018 – Paris knife attack: A man is fatally shot by police in Paris after killing one and injuring several others.
- 2024 – Middle/end of the May 2024 solar storms, the most powerful set of geomagnetic storms since the 2003 Halloween solar storms.

== Births ==
=== Pre-1600 ===
- 1325 – Rupert II, Elector Palatine (died 1398)
- 1401 – Emperor Shōkō of Japan (died 1428)
- 1479 – Pompeo Colonna, Catholic cardinal (died 1532)
- 1496 – Gustav I of Sweden (died 1560)
- 1590 – Cosimo II de' Medici, Grand Duke of Tuscany (died 1621)

=== 1601–1900 ===
- 1606 – Joachim von Sandrart, German art-historian and painter (died 1688)
- 1622 – Louis de Buade de Frontenac, French-Canadian soldier and politician, third Governor General of New France (died 1698)
- 1626 – Louis Hennepin, Flemish priest and missionary (died 1705)
- 1670 – Augustus II the Strong, Polish king (died 1733)
- 1700 – Luigi Vanvitelli, Italian architect and engineer, designed the Palace of Caserta and Royal Palace of Milan (died 1773)
- 1725 – Louis Philippe I, Duke of Orléans (died 1785)
- 1739 – Johann Baptist Wanhal, Czech-Austrian organist and composer (died 1813)
- 1754 – Franz Anton Hoffmeister, German composer and publisher (died 1812)
- 1755 – Giovanni Battista Viotti, Italian violinist and composer (died 1824)
- 1767 – Manuel Godoy, Spanish field marshal and politician, Prime Minister of Spain (died 1851)
- 1774 – Ellis Cunliffe Lister, English politician (died 1853)
- 1776 – José de La Mar, Peruvian military leader, President of Peru (died 1830)
- 1777 – Mary Reibey, Australian businesswoman (died 1855)
- 1803 – Justus von Liebig, German chemist and academic (died 1873)
- 1804 – Robert Baldwin, Canadian lawyer and politician, third Premier of West Canada (died 1858)
- 1806 – Johan Vilhelm Snellman, Finnish philosopher and politician (died 1881)
- 1812 – Edward Lear, English poet and illustrator (died 1888)
- 1814 – Adolf von Henselt, German pianist and composer (died 1889)
- 1820 – Florence Nightingale, Italian-English nurse, social reformer, and statistician (died 1910)
- 1825 – Orélie-Antoine de Tounens, French lawyer and explorer (died 1878)
- 1828 – Dante Gabriel Rossetti, English poet and painter (died 1882)
- 1829 – Pavlos Carrer, Greek composer and educator (died 1896)
- 1839 – Tôn Thất Thuyết, Vietnamese mandarin (died 1913)
- 1840 – Alejandro Gorostiaga, Chilean colonel (died 1912)
- 1842 – Jules Massenet, French composer (died 1912)
- 1845 – Gabriel Fauré, French pianist, composer, and educator (died 1924)
- 1850 – Henry Cabot Lodge, American historian and politician (died 1924)
- 1850 – Frederick Holder, Australian politician, 19th Premier of South Australia (died 1909)
- 1859 – William Alden Smith, American lawyer and politician (died 1932)
- 1859 – Frank Wilson, English-Australian politician, ninth Premier of Western Australia (died 1918)
- 1863 – Upendrakishore Ray Chowdhury, Bengali writer, painter, violin player and composer, technologist and entrepreneur (died 1915)
- 1867 – Hugh Trumble, Australian cricketer and accountant (died 1938)
- 1869 – Carl Schuhmann, German gymnast, wrestler, and weightlifter (died 1946)
- 1872 – Anton Korošec, Slovenian priest and politician, tenth Prime Minister of Yugoslavia (died 1940)
- 1873 – J. E. H. MacDonald, English-Canadian painter (died 1932)
- 1874 – Clemens von Pirquet, Austrian pediatrician and immunologist (died 1929)
- 1875 – Charles Holden, English architect, designed the Bristol Central Library (died 1960)
- 1880 – Lincoln Ellsworth, American explorer (died 1951)
- 1885 – Paltiel Daykan, Lithuanian-Israeli lawyer and jurist (died 1969)
- 1886 – Ernst A. Lehmann, German captain and pilot (died 1937)
- 1889 – Abelardo L. Rodríguez, substitute president of Mexico (died 1967)
- 1889 – Otto Frank, German-Swiss businessman and Holocaust survivor; father of diarist Anne Frank (died 1980)
- 1892 – Fritz Kortner, Austrian-German actor and director (died 1970)
- 1895 – William Giauque, Canadian-American chemist and academic, Nobel Prize laureate (died 1982)
- 1895 – Jiddu Krishnamurti, Indian-American philosopher and author (died 1986)
- 1897 – Earle Nelson, American serial killer and rapist (died 1928)
- 1899 – Indra Devi, pioneer of Yoga (died 2002)
- 1900 – Helene Weigel, Austrian-German actress (died 1971)

=== 1901–present ===
- 1903 – Wilfrid Hyde-White, English actor (died 1991)
- 1907 – Leslie Charteris, English author and screenwriter (died 1993)
- 1907 – Katharine Hepburn, American actress (died 2003)
- 1908 – Nicholas Kaldor, Hungarian-English economist (died 1986)
- 1910 – Johan Ferrier, Surinamese educator and politician, first President of Suriname (died 2010)
- 1910 – Dorothy Hodgkin, English biochemist, crystallographer, and academic, Nobel Prize laureate (died 1994)
- 1911 – Charles Biro, American author and illustrator (died 1972)
- 1914 – Howard K. Smith, American journalist and actor (died 2002)
- 1918 – Mary Kay Ash, American businesswoman, founded Mary Kay Cosmetics (died 2001)
- 1918 – Julius Rosenberg, American spy (died 1953)
- 1921 – Joseph Beuys, German sculptor and illustrator (died 1986)
- 1921 – Farley Mowat, Canadian environmentalist and author (died 2014)
- 1922 – Roy Salvadori, English racing driver and manager (died 2012)
- 1924 – Tony Hancock, English actor, producer, and screenwriter (died 1968)
- 1925 – Yogi Berra, American baseball player, coach, and manager (died 2015)
- 1927 – Barbara Dane, American folk, blues and jazz singer (died 2024)
- 1928 – Burt Bacharach, American singer-songwriter, pianist, and producer (died 2023)
- 1929 – Sam Nujoma, Namibian politician, 1st President of Namibia (died 2025)
- 1930 – Jesús Franco, Spanish director and screenwriter (died 2013)
- 1935 – Felipe Alou, Dominican-American baseball player, coach, and manager
- 1935 – Johnny Bucyk, Canadian ice hockey player
- 1936 – Guillermo Endara, Panamanian lawyer and politician, 32nd President of Panama (died 2009)
- 1936 – Tom Snyder, American journalist and talk show host (died 2007)
- 1936 – Frank Stella, American painter and sculptor (died 2024)
- 1937 – Beryl Burton, English cyclist (died 1996)
- 1937 – George Carlin, American comedian, actor, and author (died 2008)
- 1939 – Reg Gasnier, Australian rugby league player, coach, and sportscaster (died 2014)
- 1940 – Norman Whitfield, American songwriter and producer (died 2008)
- 1942 – Ian Dury, English singer-songwriter (died 2000)
- 1944 – Chris Patten, English academic and politician, 28th Governor of Hong Kong
- 1945 – Alan Ball, Jr., English footballer and manager (died 2007)
- 1945 – Ian McLagan, English keyboard player and songwriter (died 2014)
- 1946 – Daniel Libeskind, American architect, designed the Imperial War Museum North and Jewish Museum
- 1947 – Michael Ignatieff, Canadian journalist and politician
- 1948 – Dave Heineman, American politician, 39th Governor of Nebraska
- 1948 – Steve Winwood, English singer-songwriter and multi-instrumentalist
- 1950 – Bruce Boxleitner, American actor and author
- 1950 – Gabriel Byrne, Irish actor, director, and producer
- 1950 – Billy Squier, American singer-songwriter and guitarist
- 1951 – George Karl, American basketball player and coach
- 1952 – Domingos Maubere, East Timorese Catholic priest and activist (died 2025)
- 1957 – Lou Whitaker, American baseball player
- 1959 – Ving Rhames, American actor
- 1962 – Emilio Estevez, American actor
- 1962 – Brett Gurewitz, American guitarist and songwriter
- 1965 – Mark Thomas, British sprinter
- 1966 – Stephen Baldwin, American actor
- 1968 – Tony Hawk, American skateboarder and actor
- 1970 – Samantha Mathis, American actress
- 1972 – Rhea Seehorn, American actress
- 1975 – Jonah Lomu, New Zealand rugby player (died 2015)
- 1976 – Bruno Lage, Portuguese football manager
- 1977 – Maryam Mirzakhani, Iranian mathematician (died 2017)
- 1979 – Steve Smith Sr., American football player
- 1980 – Rishi Sunak, English politician, Prime Minister of the United Kingdom
- 1981 – Rami Malek, American actor
- 1983 – Domhnall Gleeson, Irish actor
- 1983 – Yujiro Kushida, Japanese wrestler and mixed martial artist
- 1986 – Emily VanCamp, Canadian actress
- 1987 – Lance Lynn, American baseball player
- 1987 – Kieron Pollard, Trinidadian cricketer
- 1987 – Darren Randolph, Irish footballer
- 1988 – Marcelo, Brazilian footballer
- 1989 – Eleftheria Eleftheriou, Greek Cypriot singer, musician, and actress
- 1990 – Florent Amodio, French figure skater
- 1990 – Etika, American YouTuber and live streamer (died 2019)
- 1992 – Erik Durm, German footballer
- 1993 – Timo Horn, German footballer
- 1996 – Fabrice Olinga, Cameroonian footballer
- 1996 – Kostas Tsimikas, Greek footballer
- 1997 – Frenkie de Jong, Dutch footballer
- 1998 – Mo Bamba, American-Ivorian basketball player
- 1999 – Hiroki Itō, Japanese footballer
- 2001 – Issa Kaboré, Burkinabé footballer
- 2005 – Zach Benson, Canadian ice hockey player
- 2006 – Vasilije Adžić, Montenegrin footballer

== Deaths ==
=== Pre-1600 ===
- 805 – Æthelhard, archbishop of Canterbury
- 940 – Eutychius, patriarch of Alexandria (born 877)
- 1003 – Sylvester II, pope of the Catholic Church (born 946)
- 1012 – Sergius IV, pope of the Catholic Church (born 970)
- 1090 – Liutold of Eppenstein, duke of Carinthia
- 1161 – Fergus of Galloway, Scottish nobleman
- 1182 – Valdemar I, king of Denmark (born 1131)
- 1331 – Engelbert of Admont, Benedictine abbot and scholar
- 1465 – Thomas Palaiologos, Despot of Morea (born 1409)
- 1490 – Joanna, Portuguese princess and regent (born 1452)
- 1529 – Cecily Bonville, 7th Baroness Harington, English noblewoman (born 1460)
- 1599 – Murad Mirza, Mughal prince (born 1570)

=== 1601–1900 ===
- 1634 – George Chapman, English poet and playwright (born 1559)
- 1641 – Thomas Wentworth, 1st Earl of Strafford, English soldier and politician, Lord Lieutenant of Ireland (born 1593)
- 1684 – Edme Mariotte, French physicist and priest (born 1620)
- 1699 – Lucas Achtschellinck, Flemish painter (born 1626)
- 1700 – John Dryden, English poet, playwright, and critic (born 1631)
- 1708 – Adolphus Frederick II, duke of Mecklenburg-Strelitz (born 1658)
- 1748 – Thomas Lowndes, English astronomer and academic (born 1692)
- 1759 – Lambert-Sigisbert Adam, French sculptor (born 1700)
- 1784 – Abraham Trembley, Swiss zoologist and academic (born 1710)
- 1792 – Charles Simon Favart, French playwright and composer (born 1710)
- 1796 – Johann Uz, German poet and author (born 1720)
- 1801 – Nicholas Repnin, Russian general and politician, Governor-General of Baltic provinces (born 1734)
- 1842 – Walenty Wańkowicz, Belarusian-Polish painter (born 1799)
- 1845 – János Batsányi, Hungarian poet and academic (born 1763)
- 1856 – Jacques Philippe Marie Binet, French mathematician, physicist, and astronomer (born 1786)
- 1859 – Sergey Aksakov, Russian author and academic (born 1791)
- 1860 – Charles Barry, English architect, designed Upper Brook Street Chapel and the Palace of Westminster (born 1795)
- 1864 – J. E. B. Stuart, American general (born 1833)
- 1867 – Friedrich Wilhelm Eduard Gerhard, German archaeologist and academic (born 1795)
- 1876 – Georgi Benkovski, Bulgarian activist (born 1843)
- 1878 – Anselme Payen, French chemist and academic (born 1795)
- 1884 – Bedřich Smetana, Czech composer and educator (born 1824)
- 1897 – Minna Canth, Finnish journalist, playwright, and activist (born 1844)
- 1900 – Göran Fredrik Göransson, Swedish merchant, ironmaster and industrialist (born 1819)

=== 1901–present ===
- 1907 – Joris-Karl Huysmans, French author and critic (born 1848)
- 1916 – James Connolly, executed Scottish-born Irish socialist and rebel leader (born 1868)
- 1916 – Seán Mac Diarmada, executed Irish rebel leader (born 1883)
- 1925 – Amy Lowell, American poet and critic (born 1874)
- 1931 – Eugène Ysaÿe, Belgian violinist, composer, and conductor (born 1858)
- 1935 – Józef Piłsudski, Polish field marshal and politician, 15th Prime Minister of Poland (born 1867)
- 1944 – Max Brand, American journalist and author (born 1892)
- 1944 – Arthur Quiller-Couch, English author, poet, and critic (born 1863)
- 1948 – Hans Waldemar Wessolowski, German-American illustrator (born 1894)
- 1956 – Louis Calhern, American actor and singer (born 1895)
- 1957 – Alfonso de Portago, Spanish bobsledder and racing driver (born 1928)
- 1957 – Erich von Stroheim, Austrian-American actor, director, and producer (born 1885)
- 1963 – Richard Girulatis, German footballer and manager (born 1878)
- 1963 – Robert Kerr, Irish-Canadian sprinter and coach (born 1882)
- 1964 – Agnes Forbes Blackadder, Scottish medical doctor (born 1875)
- 1966 – Felix Steiner, Russian-German SS officer (born 1896)
- 1967 – John Masefield, English poet and author (born 1878)
- 1970 – Nelly Sachs, German poet and playwright, Nobel Prize laureate (born 1891)
- 1971 – Heinie Manush, American baseball player and coach (born 1901)
- 1973 – Frances Marion, American screenwriter, novelist and journalist (born 1888)
- 1973 – Art Pollard, American race car driver (born 1927)
- 1981 – Francis Hughes, Irish Republican, died on hunger strike (born 1956)
- 1981 – Benjamin Sheares, Singaporean professor and politician, second President of Singapore (born 1907)
- 1985 – Jean Dubuffet, French painter and sculptor (born 1901)
- 1986 – Elisabeth Bergner, German actress (born 1897)
- 1992 – Nikos Gatsos, Greek poet and songwriter (born 1911)
- 1992 – Robert Reed, American actor (born 1932)
- 1993 – Zeno Colò, Italian Olympic alpine skier (born 1920)
- 1994 – Erik Erikson, German-American psychologist and psychoanalyst (born 1902)
- 1994 – John Smith, Scottish-English lawyer and politician, Labour Party leader, Leader of the Opposition (born 1938)
- 1995 – Adolfo Pedernera, Argentine footballer and manager (born 1918)
- 1999 – Saul Steinberg, Romanian-American illustrator (born 1914)
- 2000 – Adam Petty, American race car driver (born 1980)
- 2001 – Perry Como, American singer and television host (born 1912)
- 2001 – Didi, Brazilian footballer (born 1928)
- 2001 – Alexei Tupolev, Russian engineer, designed the Tupolev Tu-144 (born 1925)
- 2003 – Prince Sadruddin Aga Khan, French-American diplomat (born 1933)
- 2005 – Ömer Kavur, Turkish director, producer, and screenwriter (born 1944)
- 2005 – Martin Lings, English author and scholar (born 1909)
- 2005 – Kai Setälä, Finnish physician and professor (born 1913)
- 2005 – Monica Zetterlund, Swedish actress (born 1937)
- 2006 – Hussein Maziq, Libyan politician, Prime Minister of Libya (born 1918)
- 2008 – Robert Rauschenberg, American painter and illustrator (born 1925)
- 2008 – Irena Sendler, Polish nurse and humanitarian (born 1910)
- 2009 – Antonio Vega, Spanish singer-songwriter and guitarist (born 1957)
- 2012 – Jan Bens, Dutch footballer and coach (born 1921)
- 2012 – Eddy Paape, Belgian illustrator (born 1920)
- 2013 – Gerd Langguth, German political scientist, author, and academic (born 1946)
- 2014 – Cornell Borchers, Lithuanian-German actress and singer (born 1925)
- 2014 – Marco Cé, Italian cardinal (born 1925)
- 2014 – H. R. Giger, Swiss painter, sculptor, and set designer (born 1940)
- 2014 – Sarat Pujari, Indian actor, director, and screenwriter (born 1934)
- 2014 – Lorenzo Zambrano, Mexican businessman and philanthropist (born 1944)
- 2015 – Peter Gay, German-American historian, author, and academic (born 1923)
- 2016 – Mike Agostini, Trinidadian sprinter (born 1935)
- 2017 – Mauno Koivisto, Finnish banker and politician, ninth President of Finland (born 1923)
- 2018 – Dennis Nilsen, Scottish serial killer (born 1945)
- 2020 – Aimee Stephens, American funeral director and U.S. Supreme Court litigant (born 1960)
- 2024 – Mark Damon, American film actor and producer (born 1933)
- 2024 – David Sanborn, American saxophonist (born 1945)
- 2024 – A. J. Smith, American football executive (born 1949)
- 2026 – Jason Collins, American basketball player (born 1978)

== Holidays and observances ==
- Christian feast day:
  - Blessed Joan of Portugal
  - Crispoldus
  - Dominic de la Calzada
  - Epiphanius of Salamis
  - Gregory Dix (Church of England)
  - Blessed Imelda Lambertini
  - Modoald
  - Nereus, Achilleus, Domitilla, and Pancras
  - Patriarch Germanus I of Constantinople (Catholic and Eastern Church)
  - Philip of Agira
  - Rictrude
- International ME/CFS and Fibromyalgia Awareness Day
- International Nurses Day
- J. V. Snellman Day or the Finnish Heritage Day (Finland)
