= Nicholas of Methone =

12th century Byzantine theologian and philosopher

19th-century anachronistic lithograph of Nicholas

Nicholas of Methone (Greek: Νικόλαος Μεθώνης; died 1160/1166) was a Byzantine theologian and philosopher who served as the bishop of Methone from around 1150.

Nicholas wrote hagiography, hymnody, theology, biblical exegesis and panegyric. His most widely read works were his treatises against the practices and doctrines of the Latin Church, but modern scholarship regards his Refutation of the neoplatonist philosopher Proclus as his greatest work. Nicholas was close to the Emperor Manuel I Komnenos and served him as an advisor. He was involved in the major controversies over Bogomilism (1140s) and the writings of Soterichos Panteugenos (1155–1157).

== Life ==
Nicholas's life is poorly known. He was born early in the 12th century and served as a theological adviser to the Emperor Manuel I (r. 1143–1180). He sought to end the East–West Schism to bring unity between the churches and between church and state. He opposed the filioque clause and doctrine and took part in debates with the Latins. His main concern in those debates was the equality of the persons of the Trinity. He opposed the Bogomils as heretics.

He was bishop of Methone by 1147–1151, for he took an active role in the controversy that followed the deposition of Patriarch Cosmas II for Bogomilism in 1147 and continued until the resignation of his successor, Nicholas IV. He wrote an account of the affair, in which he presents himself as one of the few supporters of Nicholas IV, who had previously resigned from the archbishopric of Cyprus. Although the controversy over Nicholas IV had brought him to Constantinople, Nicholas spent most of his time as bishop in Methone and was critical of those bishops who preferred to stay in the capital. Nevertheless, he did not like Methone, calling it "the depths of the earth" (quoting Psalm 63:9).

Nicholas was probably bishop when Methone was devastated by a Norman raid in 1147. He refers to the destruction in an address to the emperor. His last datable work is from 1160. He died sometime before 1166. He was one of the most prominent intellectuals of 12th-century Byzantium and his works were considered authoritative down to the end of the Byzantine empire.

== Works ==
Sixteen works in Greek by Nicholas are known.

There are also many works that have been falsely ascribed to Nicholas. An erotapocritic work published under the title Eroteseis kai apokriseis (Questions and Answers) is not in fact a work of Nicholas, but is a set of extracts from Theodore of Raithu that became appended to the Refutation. Since he was most famous for his anti-Latin treatises, many similar works came to be misattributed to Nicholas in later centuries, including some that have been identified as the works of Nicholas of Otranto and John Kamateros.

=== Hagiography and hymnody ===
Nicholas's earliest work is perhaps the hagiography of Meletios the Younger that he wrote to demonstrate that true godliness was still possible in his own day. It was completed thirty-six years after the saint's death, which corresponds to 1141 or so. Two canons (hymns) by Nicholas are known, one on Meletios and another celebrating Leo of Catania. They are usually lumped together with his hagiography of Meletios.

=== Anti-Latin treatises ===
Around the same time as he wrote his life of Meletios or perhaps even earlier, Nicholas wrote three anti-Latin treatises:

- Pros tous Latinous peri tou Hagiou Pneumatos (To the Latins Concerning the Holy Spirit), possibly written in 1136, survives in 36 manuscripts
- Kephalaiodeis tou para Latinois kainophanous dogmatos, a summary of the arguments of Photios, survives in 15 manuscripts
- Apomnemoneumata ek ton en diaphorois logois gegrammenon kata Latinon (Memoirs of the Various Words Written Against the Latins), a summary of the previous two treatises made at the request of a friend, survives in two manuscripts

The anti-Latin treatises were being copied into the modern era and were even translated into demotic Greek.

Nicholas's next earliest work is a treatise on the eucharist, Pros tous distazontas kai legontas, probably written in the mid-1140s during the Bogomil controversy and the Nephon affair. It was the first of his works to be translated out of Greek and the first to be printed. Popular in the West at the time of the Reformation, it was put into Latin (printed 1560) and French (1561, by Gentian Hervet). Nicholas wrote another work on the eucharist, Logos peri azumon (On the Azymes), in which he defends the use of leavened bread against the "azymite" practice of the Latins.

=== Answers to questioners ===
Nicholas's next work chronologically is a response to a question posed by the Grand Domestic John Axouch, Pros ton megan Domestikon erotesanta peri tou hagiou Pneumatos. Although the question had been asked before the Second Crusade and the emperor had urged Nicholas to respond, he only got around to writing an answer after the crusade (probably around 1147). The question posed was why the Apostles (sent ones) cannot be called Christs (anointed ones).

Sometime before 1155, Nicholas wrote a series of responses to another questioner of high rank:

- Pros tou erotesanta ei estin horos zoes kai thanatou, on whether one's term (length) of life is predestined
- Peri tou autou logos deuteros, a second word on the same
- Peri tou autou logos tritos, a third word on the same

These three treatises survive in a single manuscript and can be dated by a reference to his unfinished Anaptyxis. The questioner had read a work on the aorist position (a person's lifespan is undetermined) and wanted Nicholas to refute it.

=== Controversies ===
Peri tes epi te katastasei tou Patriarchou antilogias kai peri hierarchias, possibly written as early as 1148, but more probably in 1150–51, is a defence of the new patriarch, Nicholas IV, and of imperial policy during the Bogomil controversy. It contains an address to Manuel I and a fictional dialogue with his opponents in which Nicholas attacks "innovations" (kainotomiai).

Pros tous skandalizomenous (To the Scandalized), an exegetical treatise on 1 Corinthians 15:28, was written shortly before the meeting of the endemic synod on 26 January 1156. Nicholas condemns two errors: reading the scriptures only out of intellectual curiosity and ignoring context, which leads to Arianism and Origenism. The controversy over the writings of Soterichos Panteugenos on the eucharist drew three works from Nicholas:

- Antirresis pros ta graphenta para Soterichou (Objection to the Writings of Soterichos), written before the Council of Blachernae in 1157
- Ta leiponta peri tes theias hierourgias
- Pros ton megiston basilea

The last is a panegyrical iteration of the Antirresis addressed to the emperor, in which Nicholas apologizes for not coming to Constantinople to participate in the fight against Soterichos on account of his advanced age. He lauds Manuel for his military victories in the east, north, west and at sea, and for his gifts to the churches. He expresses the hope that Manuel might reunite the eastern and western churches. By references to three historical events—Manuel's attack on Prince Thoros II of Armenia in 1158, his entry into Antioch in 1159 and the Muslim attack on Manuel's forces near Kotiaion in 1159, which Manuel followed up with a punitive expedition the following year—this work can be dated to 1160 and is Nicholas' last datable work.

=== Refutation of Proclus ===
Nicholas's major theologico-philosophical work is the Refutation (Anaptyxis) of Proclus' Elements of Theology, which survives in thirteen manuscripts and in a sixteenth-century Latin translation. This work has come to be regarded as his magnum opus. He had begun work on it no later than 1155 and seems to have ceased work on it by 1159. He probably began writing in Constantinople and stopped in Methone. It was probably unfinished at his death, since the last fourteen theorems of Proclus are not refuted. Nicholas rejected Proclus' Neoplatonism, but his refutation is based mainly on appeals to the authority of the Church Fathers.

== Editions ==
- Nicholas of Methone (1984). Angelou, Athanasios D. (ed.). Refutation of Proclus' Elements of Theology: A Critical Edition with an Introduction on Nicholas' Life and Works. E. J. Brill.

== Bibliography ==
- Angelou, Athanassios (1981). "Nicholas of Methone: The Life and Works of a Twelfth-Century Bishop". In Margaret Mullett; Roger Scott (eds.). Byzantium and the Classical Tradition: University of Birmingham Thirteenth Spring Symposium of Byzantine Studies 1979 in Conjunction with the Seventy-fifth Anniversary of the Classical Association. Centre for Byzantine Studies, University of Birmingham. pp. 143–148.
- Angelou, Athanasios D. (1984). "Introduction". Nicholas of Methone, Refutation of Proclus' Elements of Theology: A Critical Edition with an Introduction on Nicholas' Life and Works. E. J. Brill. pp. IX–LXXX.
- Gioffreda, Anna; Trizio, Michele (2021). "Nicholas of Methone, Procopius of Gaza and Proclus of Lycia". In Dragos Calma (ed.). Reading Proclus and the Book of Causes, Volume 2: Translations and Acculturations. Brill. pp. 94–135. doi:10.1163/9789004440685_006. ISBN 978-90-04-44068-5.
- Kazhdan, Alexander (1989). "Review of Nicholas of Methone 1984". Speculum. 64 (1): 196–199. doi:10.2307/2852228. JSTOR 2852228.
- Kazhdan, Alexander (1991). "Nicholas of Methone". In Kazhdan, Alexander (ed.). The Oxford Dictionary of Byzantium. Oxford and New York: Oxford University Press. ISBN 0-19-504652-8.
- Matula, Jozef (2011). "Nicholas of Methone". In Henrik Lagerlund (ed.). Encyclopedia of Medieval Philosophy. Springer. pp. 881–883. doi:10.1007/978-1-4020-9729-4_356. ISBN 978-1-4020-9728-7.
- Treiger, Alexander (2014). "Agathon of Homs". In Samuel Noble; Alexander Treiger (eds.). The Orthodox Church in the Arab World, 700–1700: An Anthology of Sources. Cornell University Press. pp. 201–215.
