= Australian Mother of the Year Award =

Australia's Mother of the Year Awards is an award which aims to recognise mothers and the important role that they play in our society; highlighting key themes such as nurturing and caring. Barnardos Australia developed the Mother of the Year Awards (BAMYA) in 1994, as an opportunity to showcase the women responsible for excellent parenting within the community.

Nominations for the awards take place over a four-month period during which a campaign is undertaken in major print and electronic media. Nominators prepare a statement about "why they believe their mother is Australia's number 1 mum".

A judging panel assesses the top 100 nominations, selecting State/Territory finalists and an overall national winner. Each State/Territory Finalist is flown to Sydney for the announcement of the National Mother of the Year.

A winner is announced for every respective State/Territory at a morning tea function held to showcase that woman's achievements. These events attracts wide coverage from local media, culminating in a national presentation held in Sydney in May just prior to the Sunday designated as Mother's Day in Australia.

In 2021 Barnardo's announced that, because of the pressure on resources created by COVID-19, the award had been brought to an end.

== Past winners ==
Awarded	Name	Notes
2020	Margie Bailey	
2019	Maria Worner	
2018	Noelene Lever AM	
2017	Carol Edmunds	
2016	Keelen Mailman	
2015	Leanne Robson	
2014	Gloria Nascimento	
2013	Hasiba Cesko	
2012	Roslyn Dodson	
2011	Rebecca Healy	
2010	Kaye Worth	
2009	Bernadette Black	
2008	Heather Round	
2007	Natasha Crofts	
2006	Carmel Gordon	
2005	Melissa Davies	
2004	Maryanne Malbunka	
2003	Elva Stevenson	
2002	Lorraine Dewsbury	
2001	Gayle McCarthy	
2000	Vera Hall	
1999	Leonie Parmenter	

== See also ==
- Australian Father Of The Year award
- Australian Nurse of the Year
