= Question-and-answer literature =

Erotapokriseis (Greek: ἐρωταποκρίσεις, lit. 'questions and answers'), singular erotapokrisis (ἐρωταπόκρισις), or question-and-answer literature, is a genre of Byzantine and late antique literature. Erotapokriseis are a series of questions and answers in the form of a dialogue. Topics touched upon include Christian dogma, biblical exegesis, canon law, cosmology, and riddles. The interlocutors are typically anonymous or at least not fully characterized. One is a teacher and the other a pupil. The answers are generally presented as gnomai, dogmatic truths.

The genre originated around 400, but was at its most popular between the seventh and ninth centuries. It declined thereafter, but experienced a revival in the fifteenth century. Among the Greek authors of the genre are Maximus the Confessor, John of Damascus, Anastasius of Sinai, Nicholas of Methone, Nicetas of Heraclea, Symeon of Thessalonica and Mark of Ephesus. The pinnacle of the genre was reached in the Amphilochia of Photius. Many erotapokriseis were translated and a few composed in Slavonic. The earliest translations were made in the First Bulgarian Empire, the most important being that of Anastasius of Sinai's Interrogationes et responsiones.
