= National Student Nurses Day =

National Student Nurses Day takes place on 8 May every year.

In 1997, May 8 is designated as National Student Nurses Day. This day is dedicated for nursing students achievements as they pursue a career in the medicine field. The American Nurses Association supports and promotes the Nursing profession along with territorial nurses associations at the state and regional level.

== History ==
1953: Dorothy Sutherland of the U.S. department of health proposed a day dedicated for Nurses to the President Dwights D. Eisenhower in October but was not approved.

1954: National Nurse Week was inspected from October 11 through October 16. The bill for nurse week was sponsored by Frances P. Bolton and was introduced in 1955 Congress, but there was no action taken.

1972: National Registered Nurse Day was presented by the House of Representative to the president but was not approved.

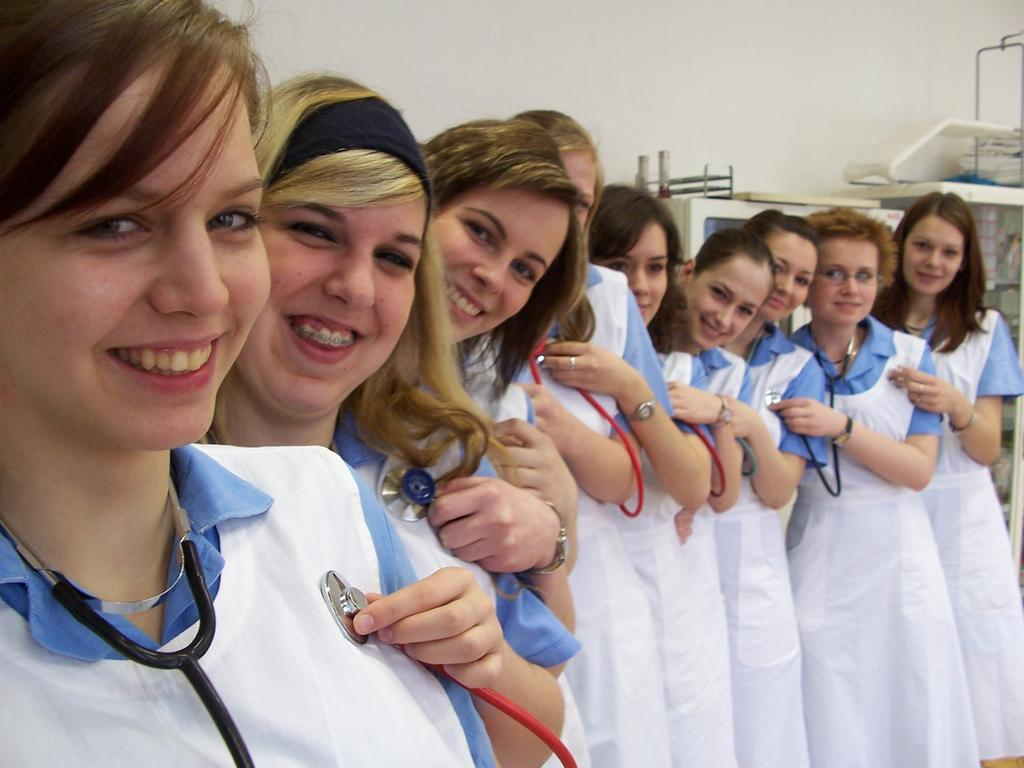
Name: National Student Nurses Day Date: May 8th, 1997 Frequency: Annual Designated: ANA Board of Directors

1974In January the International Council of Nurses (ICN) announced that May 12 should be National Nurse day (May 12 is Florence Nightingale birthday, the founder of modern nursing). In February, the White House designed a week of Nation Nurse Week and was proclaimed by President Nixon.

1978: Brendon Byrne the New Jersey Governor announced that on May 6 it would be "Nurse Day." Edward Scanlan, of Red Bank approved for Nurses to have the recognition in his state.

1981: Through their Congressman, Manuel Lujan, a rally to support a day dedicated for nurses on May 6, 1982, was initiated by ANA and various nursing organization in New Mexico.

1982: The ANA Board of Directors recognized and approved May 6, 1982, as "National Nurse day." This further affirmed a joint resolution of the United States Congress to design May 6 as "National Recognition Day for Nurses." on March 25, President Ronald Reagan signed a proclamation to approve May 6 as "National Recognition Day for Nurse."

1990: The ANA Board of Directors decided to have a week of recognition for nurses to celebrate from May 6 through May 12 as National Nurses Week.

1993: National Nurses Week was designed permanently on May 6 through May 12 by the ANA Board of Directors.

1996: National RN Recognition Day on May 6, 1996, was also initiated by the ANA Board of Directors to celebrate registered nurses for their commitment to their patients. ANA motivates other states, nurses associations and other organization to celebrate May 6 as "National RN Recognition Day."

1997: National Student Nurses Day was also designed by the ANA Board of Directors to be celebrated on May 8.

== See also ==
- International Nurses Day
