= Soterichos Panteugenos =

12th-century Byzantine cleric and theologian

Soterichos Panteugenos (Greek: Σωτήριχος Παντεύγενος) was a Byzantine cleric and theologian who was briefly Patriarch-elect of Antioch in 1156–57.

== Life ==
Originally a deacon of the Hagia Sophia, Panteugenos was elected as Patriarch of Antioch in 1156, but was quickly embroiled in a raging Christological controversy, siding with the rhetoricians Michael of Thessalonica and Nikephoros Basilakes, who strongly distinguished between the persons of the Holy Trinity and argued that the Eucharist was offered to God the Father alone. Panteugenos set forth his arguments in the form of a Platonic dialogue, which was acknowledged as a brilliant work even by his detractors.

This work is now lost, and its contents known only from the polemical attacks on it by Panteugenos' opponents, chiefly Nicholas of Methone. Reportedly, Panteugenos strictly distinguished the Father from Christ (the Son), who through his Crucifixion offered himself as a sacrifice to his father. As a result, in Panteugenos' doctrine, humanity exchanged substance by physically incorporating the Son, and became a sort of partner to God the Father. This notion was anathema to many Orthodox theologians, and his views were condemned by a Church synod, but Panteugenos demanded the right to defend his views before Emperor Manuel I Komnenos.

As Paul Magdalino comments, Panteugenos was not just any cleric. The see to which he had been elected was highly sensitive politically, as the right to appoint an Orthodox prelate to the patriarchal see of Antioch had been a core demand of Byzantine policy versus the Crusader Principality of Antioch since the Treaty of Devol in 1108. Indeed, when he secured the submission and recognition of his overlordship by Prince Raynald of Châtillon in 1158, the obligation to accept a patriarch appointed by Constantinople was one of the terms imposed on Raynald. This shows that Panteugenos had good connections at court, while it is also clear that his views had some support among the clergy. Magdalino even suggests that Panteugenos, with his "powerful intellect", was the driving figure behind the theological controversies that destabilized the Orthodox Church in the period 1143–1157.

The result was the Council of Blachernae in May 1157, before an assembly of senior courtiers and clergy. After Michael and Basilakes recanted, Panteugenos stubbornly defended his views even against the Emperor, until he too was persuaded to confess to error. After that, the most senior of the prelates present, including the patriarchs of Constantinople and Jerusalem, and the Archbishop of Bulgaria, demanded his dismissal, which was announced the next day.

== Sources ==
- Kazhdan, Alexander; Wharton-Epstein, Ann (1985). Change in Byzantine Culture in the Eleventh and Twelfth Centuries. Berkeley, California: University of California Press. ISBN 978-0-5200-5129-4.
- Magdalino, Paul (2002) [1993]. The Empire of Manuel I Komnenos, 1143–1180 (Second ed.). Cambridge: Cambridge University Press. ISBN 9780521526531.
- Yermilov, Pavel (2006). "What was Soterichos Panteugenos condemned for? The evidence of the sources". Proceedings of the 21st International Congress of Byzantine Studies, London 21-26 August 2006. Volume III: Abstracts of Communications. Aldershot: Ashgate. pp. 208–209. ISBN 978-0-7546-5740-8.

Eastern Orthodox Church titles
Preceded by John VI (or V)	Greek Orthodox Patriarch of Antioch; 1156–1157	Succeeded by Euthymius
