= International Nurses Day =

Observance to mark the contributions nurses make to society

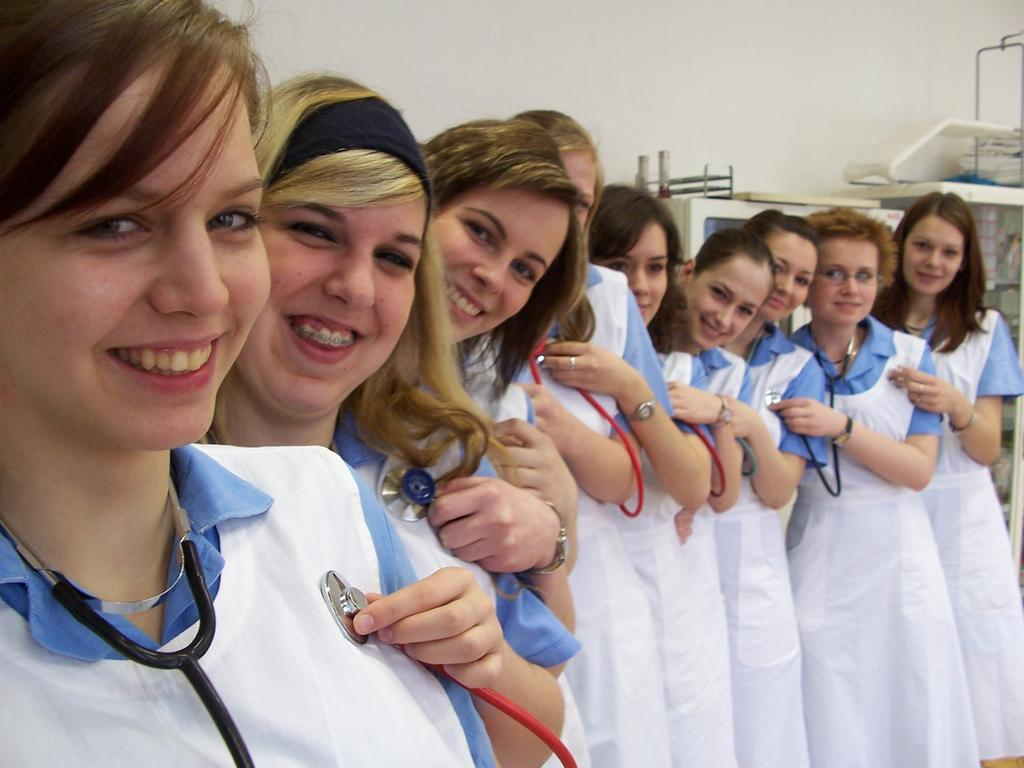
- Czech nursing students (2006)
- Also called: ICN
- Observed by: Various countries
- Date: 12 May
- Next time: 12 May 2027
- Frequency: annual
- First time: 1965

International Nurses Day (IND) is an international day observed around the world on 12 May (the anniversary of Florence Nightingale's birth) each year, to mark the contributions that nurses make to society.

== Background ==
The International Council of Nurses (ICN) has celebrated this day since 1965. In 1953 Dorothy Sutherland, an official with the U.S. Department of Health, Education and Welfare, proposed that President Dwight D. Eisenhower proclaim a "Nurses' Day"; but he did not approve it.

In January 1974, 12 May was chosen to celebrate the day as it is the anniversary of the birth of Florence Nightingale, the founder of modern nursing. Each year, ICN prepares and distributes the International Nurses' Day Kit. The kit contains educational and public information materials, for use by nurses everywhere. As of 1998, 8 May was designated as annual National Student Nurses' Day in the US.

== Themes ==
The themes for International Nurses Day have been:

Year	Theme	Ref.
1988	Safe Motherhood	
1989	School Health	
1990	Nurses and Environment	
1991	Mental Health – Nurses in Action	
1992	Healthy Aging	
1993	Quality, costs and Nursing	
1994	Healthy Families for Healthy Nation	
1995	Women's Health: Nurses Pave the Way	
1996	Better Health through Nursing Research	
1997	Healthy Young People = A Brighter Future	
1998	Partnership for Community Health	
1999	Celebrating Nursing's Past, claiming the future	
2000	Nurses – Always there for you	
2001	Nurses, Always There for You: United Against Violence	
2002	Nurses Always There for You: Caring for Families	
2003	Nurses: Fighting AIDS stigma, working for all	
2004	Nurses: Working with the Poor; Against Poverty	
2005	Nurses for Patients' Safety: Targeting counterfeit medicines and substandard medication	
2006	Safe staffing saves lives	
2007	Positive practice environments: Quality workplaces = quality patient care	
2008	Delivering Quality, Serving Communities: Nurses Leading Primary Health Care and social care	
2009	Delivering Quality, Serving Communities: Nurses Leading Care Innovations	
2010	Delivering Quality, Serving Communities: Nurses Leading Chronic Care	
2011	Closing The Gap: Increasing Access and Equity	
2012	Closing The Gap: From Evidence to Action	
2013	Closing The Gap: Millennium Development Goals	
2014	Nurses: A Force for Change – A vital resource for health	
2015	Nurses: A Force for Change: Care Effective, Cost Effective	
2016	Nurses: A Force for Change: Improving Health Systems' Resilience	
2017	Nurses: A Voice to Lead – Achieving the Sustainable Development Goals	
2018	Nurses: A Voice to Lead – Health is a Human right	
2019	Nurses: A Voice to Lead – Health for All	
2020	Nurses: A Voice to Lead – Nursing the World to Health	
2021	Nurses: A Voice to Lead - A Vision for Future Healthcare	
2022	Nurses: Make a Difference	
2023	Our Nurses. Our Future.	
2024	Our Nurses, Our Future: The Economic Power of Care.	
2025	Our Nurses, Our Future: Caring for nurses strengthens economies.	
2026	Our Nurses. Our Future. Empowered Nurses Save Lives.	

== National activities ==
=== Australia ===
The Australian Nurse of the Year is announced at a ceremony at one of the state capital cities. Additionally, in each of the Australian states and territories, various nursing award ceremonies are conducted during the week.

=== China ===
In 2007, 5000 nurses gathered in Yichun, East China's Jiangxi Province.

=== Ireland ===
Since 2012, Nurse Jobs Ireland (an Irish nurse recruitment agency) launch a week long pro-bono campaign to celebrate nurses on the 6–12 May every year. This week long celebration uses digital platforms such as Twitter and Facebook to promote the great work nurses do using the hashtag #CelebrateNurses. The public leave their positive comments and thanks on the Celebrate Nurses website where they are collated into an ebook which is shared in medical facilities throughout Ireland.

=== Singapore ===
Singapore celebrates Nurses Day on 1 August. Back in the 1800s, a thriving Singapore found itself in need of providing better healthcare and medical services to a growing population. While there were several hospitals, there was a lack of nurses to support the doctors. French nuns from the Convent of the Holy Infant Jesus were trained to become nurses to fulfil this need, as they were seen as the only educated European women in Singapore who could undertake this challenge. 1 August 1885 marks the beginning of the development of nursing in Singapore when these nuns began their nursing duties in the General Hospital at the Sepoy Lines in the Outram area.

=== Taiwan ===
In 2003, after the outbreak of highly contagious SARS, President Chen Shui-bian visited a hospital on International Nurses Day to express admiration for 3 nurses who died of SARS, among other medical personnel fighting on the frontline. He conveyed wishes to nurses for their devotion to duty of caring and reminded hospital staff that they should adopt strict precautionary measures to protect themselves before contacting with patients.

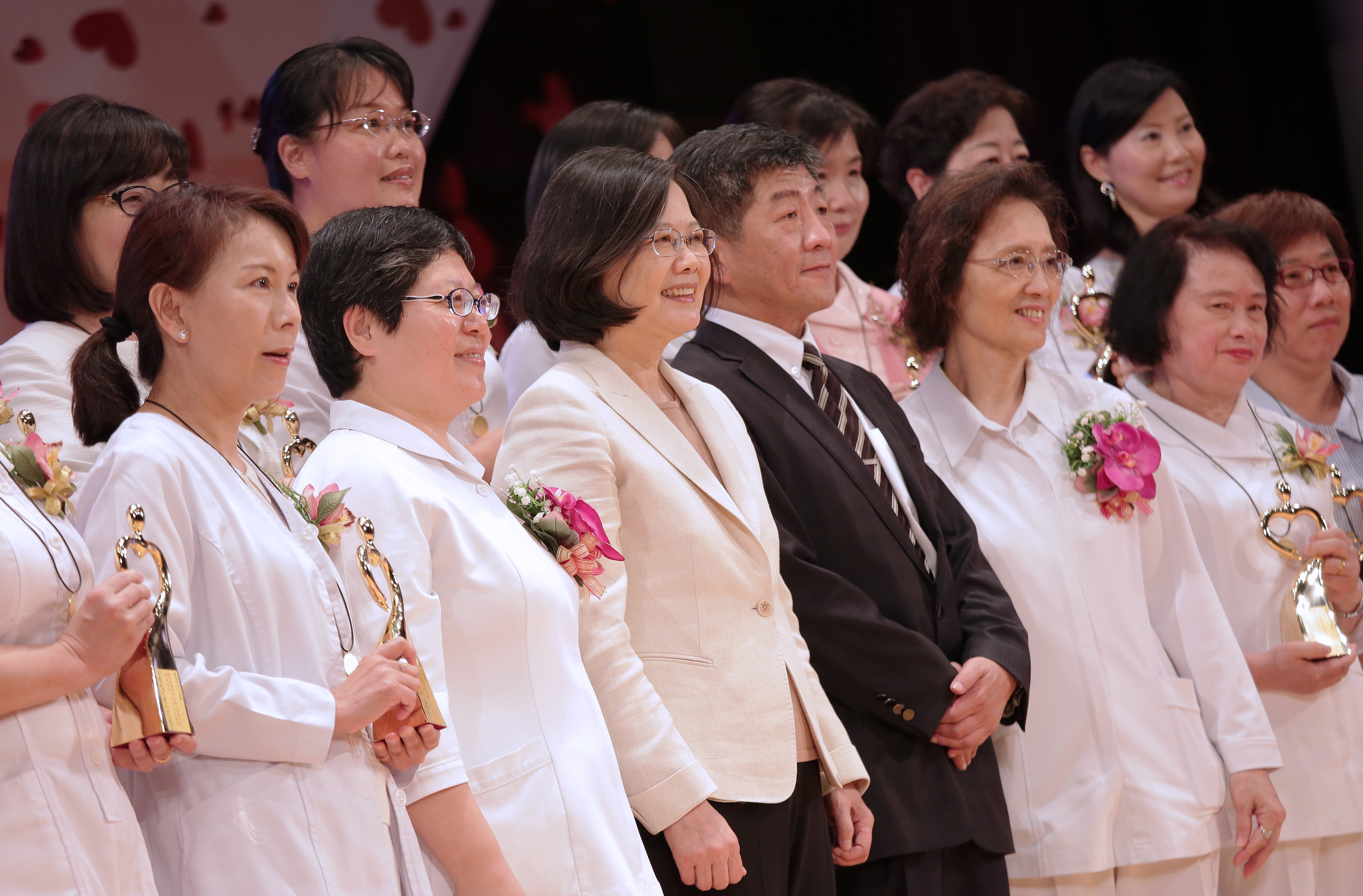
President Tsai Ing-wen, with the Minister of Health and Welfare, attends International Nurses Day celebration

=== Thailand ===
Starting in 1990, Thailand observes 21 October as National Nurses' Day วันพยาบาลแห่งชาติ (Wan Phayaban Haeng Chat). The date commemorates the birth of Srinagarindra the Princess Mother and was adopted 4 April 1990.

=== United Kingdom ===
Each year a service is held in Westminster Abbey in London. During the service, a symbolic lamp is taken from The Nurses' Chapel in the Abbey and handed from one nurse to another, thence to the Dean, who places it on the High Altar.

=== United States and Canada (National Nursing Week) ===
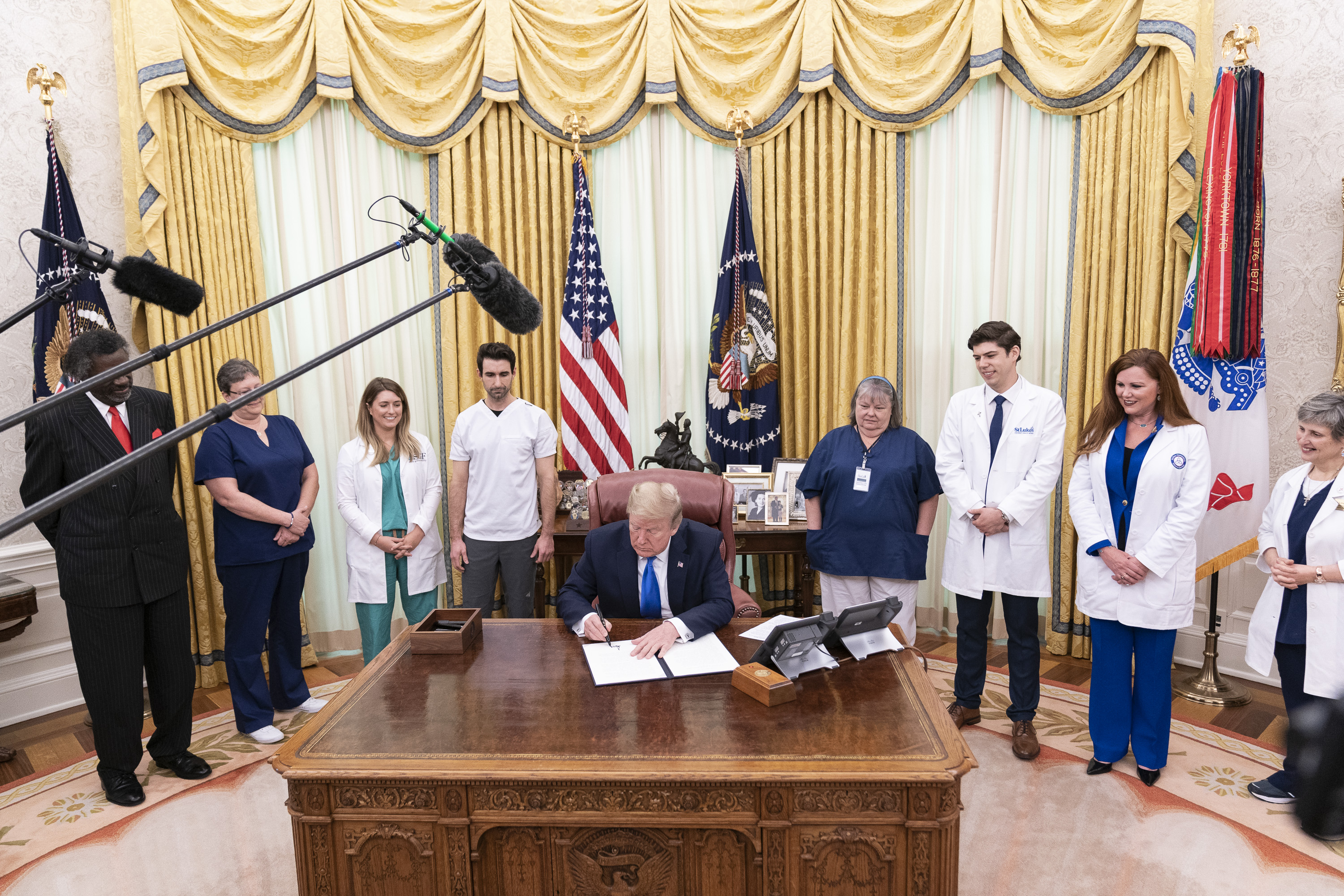
US President Donald Trump signs a proclamation in honor of National Nurses Day in May 2020

The U.S. celebrates National Nursing Week each year from 6 May to 12 May (the birthday of Florence Nightingale). Canada celebrates National Nursing Week each year during the week that includes 12 May. The Canadian Minister of Health instituted National Nursing Week in Canada in 1985.

=== Vietnam ===
Since 1990s, Nurses have recognized the international nurse day. Officially, Viet Duc University Hospital, Hanoi, Vietnam, The Board of Director approved anniversary of international nurse day on May 12, 2015. Since 2018 Department of Health issues, the first announcement encourages all health care hospital and facility host event or meeting for the international nurse day all over of Vietnam.

=== Iran ===
After the Iranian revolution, the birthday of Zaynab bint Ali was designated as Nurses' Day.

== See also ==
- Florence Nightingale
- Florence Nightingale Medal
- National Student Nurses Day
- The New York Times
