= Council of Blachernae (1157) =

The Council of Blachernae was a church council in the Byzantine Empire, convened in May 1157 at the imperial Palace of Blachernae, which condemned the newly elected Patriarch of Antioch Soterichos Panteugenos, and the rhetoricians Michael of Thessalonica and Nikephoros Basilakes.

== Background ==
The exact background of the accusations against Panteugenos and the rhetoricians is not entirely clear, as Panteugenos' work does not survive, and the only source describing their views is the deeply hostile work of Panteugenos' opponent, Nicholas of Methone. Reportedly, Panteugenos strictly distinguished God the Father from Christ (the Son), who through his Crucifixion offered himself as a sacrifice to his father. In Panteugenos' view, humanity thereby exchanged substance by physically incorporating the Son, and became a sort of partner to God the Father. These views were regarded as heretical, and condemned by a Church synod, but Panteugenos demanded the right to defend his views before Emperor Manuel I Komnenos.

The case was heard before an assembly of senior courtiers and clergy. After Michael and Basilakes recanted, Panteugenos stubbornly defended his views even against the Emperor, until he too was persuaded to confess to error. After that, the most senior of the prelates present, including the patriarchs of Constantinople and Jerusalem, and the Archbishop of Bulgaria, demanded his dismissal, which was announced the next day.

== Sources ==
- Kazhdan, Alexander; Wharton-Epstein, Ann (1985). Change in Byzantine Culture in the Eleventh and Twelfth Centuries. Berkeley, California: University of California Press. ISBN 978-0-5200-5129-4.
- Magdalino, Paul (2002) [1993]. The Empire of Manuel I Komnenos, 1143–1180. Cambridge: Cambridge University Press. ISBN 0-521-52653-1.
- Yermilov, Pavel (2006). "What was Soterichos Panteugenos condemned for? The evidence of the sources". Proceedings of the 21st International Congress of Byzantine Studies, London 21-26 August 2006. Volume III: Abstracts of Communications. Aldershot: Ashgate. pp. 208–209. ISBN 978-0-7546-5740-8.
