= Australian Nurse of the Year =

Annual award for nurses in Australia

The Australian Nurse of the Year Award was created to honour and showcase excellence in the nursing profession throughout Australia. It has become recognised as the highest civilian accolade for a nurse in Australia. There were 490,333 nurses registered to practice in Australia as of September 2025.

The award was established in 2003 to 2004 to recognise the exceptional contributions the recipient has made to improving care and outcomes for patients, providing excellent care in the face of adversity or other challenges, or for an outstanding act of kindness, understanding, compassion or courage, above and beyond the normal role as a nurse anywhere in Australia.

A judging panel of nationally recognised nursing experts assesses the top individual nominees and selects a nurse from each of Australia's states and territories. Each state or territory finalist is flown to a state capital (the place of ceremony is changed each year), where the winner is announced at a formal ceremony. In recent years, other categories of awards have been added. These are for an Outstanding Graduate and another is for Team Innovation.

Although the award is not associated with the Australian government-run Australian of the Year awards, it has been sponsored by various organisations and companies each year, including the Australian Department of Health and Ageing, The College of Nursing (Australia), Elsevier Medical Publications, the Australian Nursing Federation, Nursing Review, Laerdal, ME Bank, and other businesses. From their inception in 2004 the awards were hosted by Healthstaff Recruitment, and since 2007 by HESTA Superannuation Fund.

The awards attract wide coverage from media, culminating in a national presentation held each year, usually on or close to, 12 May, International Nurses' Day.

== Past winners ==
Year	Recipient	Location	Ref
2004	Andrew Cameron	Cue, Western Australia	
2005	Catriona Chardon (posthumously)	Lismore, New South Wales	
2006	Rosanne Squire	McLeans Ridge, New South Wales	
2007	Robyn Williams	Wynnum, Queensland	
2008	Sam Gibson	Subiaco, Western Australia	
2009	Lyn Olsen	Dandenong, Victoria	
2010	Charlotte Collins	Trigg, Western Australia	
2011	Paul Esplin	Sydney, New South Wales	
2012	Jenny Anderson	Rockhampton, Queensland	
2013	Sara Lohmeyer	Perth, Western Australia	
2014	Steve Brown	Melbourne, Victoria	
2015	Catrin Dittmar	Lake Macquarie, New South Wales	
2016	Angie Monk	Joondalup, Western Australia	
2017	Sarah Brown	Alice Springs, Northern Territory	
2018	Gail Yarran	East Perth, Western Australia	
2019	Professor Kate Curtis	Wollongong, New South Wales	
2020	Tania Green	Monash, Victoria	
2021	Shannon Philp	Sydney, New South Wales	
2022	Sue Hegarty	Melbourne, Victoria	
2023	Caitlin Clayer	Ti Tree, Northern Territory	
2024	Cathy Halmarick	Frankston, Victoria	
2025	Tye Simpson	Melbourne, Victoria	
2026	Helen Lamech	Alice Springs, Northern Territory	
