= Manuel I Komnenos =

Byzantine emperor from 1143 to 1180

- Emperor and Autocrat of the Romans
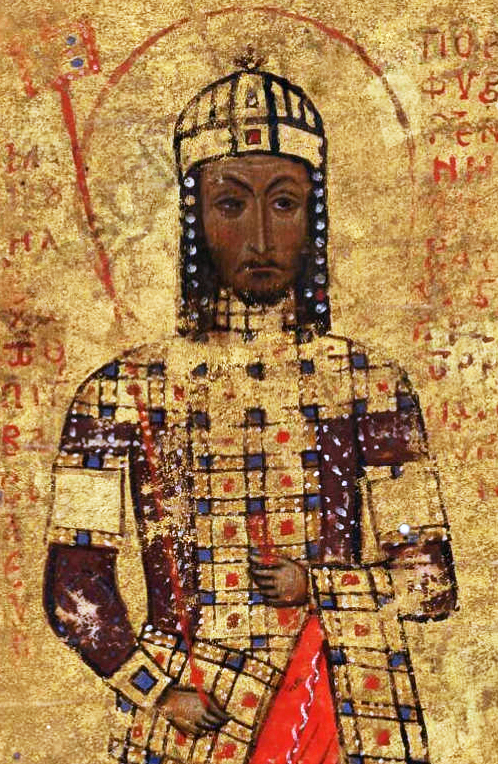
- Manuscript miniature, part of double portrait with Empress Maria, Vatican Library

Byzantine emperor
- Reign: 8 April 1143 – 24 September 1180
- Predecessor: John II Komnenos
- Successor: Alexios II Komnenos
- Born: 28 November 1118
- Died: 24 September 1180 (aged 61)
- Spouses: Bertha of Sulzbach; Maria of Antioch
- Issue: Maria Komnene; Alexios II Komnenos
Names
- Manuel Komnenos; Μανουήλ Κομνηνός
- House: Komnenian dynasty
- Father: John II Komnenos
- Mother: Irene of Hungary
- Religion: Eastern Orthodox Christian

Manuel I Komnenos (Greek: Μανουήλ Κομνηνός, romanized: Manouḗl Komnēnós; 28 November 1118 – 24 September 1180) was a Byzantine emperor of the 12th century who reigned over a crucial turning point in the history of Byzantium and the Mediterranean. His reign saw the last flowering of the Komnenian restoration, during which the Byzantine Empire experienced a resurgence of military and economic power and enjoyed a cultural revival.

Eager to restore his empire to its past glories as the great power of the Mediterranean world, Manuel pursued an energetic and ambitious foreign policy. In the process he made alliances with Pope Adrian IV and the resurgent West. He invaded the Norman Kingdom of Sicily, although unsuccessfully, being the last Eastern Roman emperor to attempt reconquests in the western Mediterranean. The passage of the potentially dangerous Second Crusade through his empire was adroitly managed. Manuel established a Byzantine protectorate over the Crusader states of Outremer. Facing Muslim advances in the Holy Land, he made common cause with the Kingdom of Jerusalem and participated in a combined invasion of Fatimid Egypt. Manuel reshaped the political maps of the Balkans and the eastern Mediterranean, placing the kingdoms of Hungary and Outremer under Byzantine hegemony and campaigning aggressively against his neighbours both in the west and in the east.

However, towards the end of his reign, Manuel's achievements in the east were compromised by a serious defeat at Myriokephalon, which in large part resulted from his arrogance in attacking a well-defended Seljuk position. Although the Byzantines recovered and Manuel concluded an advantageous peace with Sultan Kilij Arslan II, Myriokephalon proved to be the final, unsuccessful effort by the empire to recover the interior of Anatolia from the Turks.

Manuel is known to have inspired intense loyalty in those who served him. He also appears as the hero of a history written by his secretary, John Kinnamos, in which every virtue is attributed to him. Manuel, who was influenced by his contact with western Crusaders, enjoyed the reputation of "the most blessed emperor of Constantinople" in parts of the Latin world as well. Some historians have been less enthusiastic about him, however, asserting that the great power he wielded was not his own personal achievement, but that of the Komnenos dynasty he represented. Further, it has also been argued that since Byzantine imperial power declined catastrophically after Manuel's death, it is only natural to look for the causes of this decline in his reign.

== Youth ==
Manuel Komnenos was born on 28 November 1118, in the Purple Chamber of the Great Palace of Constantinople. Due to this, he was also called Porphyrogenitus (Greek: Πορφυρογέννητος, romanized: Porphyrogénnētos; "born in the purple"). He was the eighth child and fourth son of John II Komnenos, the newly-crowned emperor, and Irene of Hungary. Manuel's eldest brother, Alexios, was crowned co-emperor, and Niketas Choniates narrates that in 1123 John raised Manuel and Manuel's other older brothers, Andronikos and Isaac, to the rank of sebastokratores.

Manuel was raised alongside his cousin Andronikos, with whom he became close. He did not receive a formal education, and was trained to be a soldier. He accompanied his father on military expeditions against the Anatolian Turks. On one occasion he led his personal attendants in a counterattack, which reversed the course of an engagement which was favouring the enemy. This occurred during the unsuccessful Siege of Neocaesarea (1140), against the Danishmendid Turks. Manuel favourably impressed his father by his courage and fortitude, John praising him as the 'Saviour of the Romans', though he also criticised his rashness.

As part of his policy concerning the Crusader states, John II groomed Manuel to marry princess Constance of Antioch. John hoped that Manuel would become the master of a large domain, consisting of Attalia, Cyprus, Cilicia and Antioch. The Antiochenes, though ready to swear fealty to the Byzantine emperor, proved reluctant to accept any real level of Byzantine control. Manuel's eldest brothers, Alexios and Andronikos, died in 1142.

== Accession ==
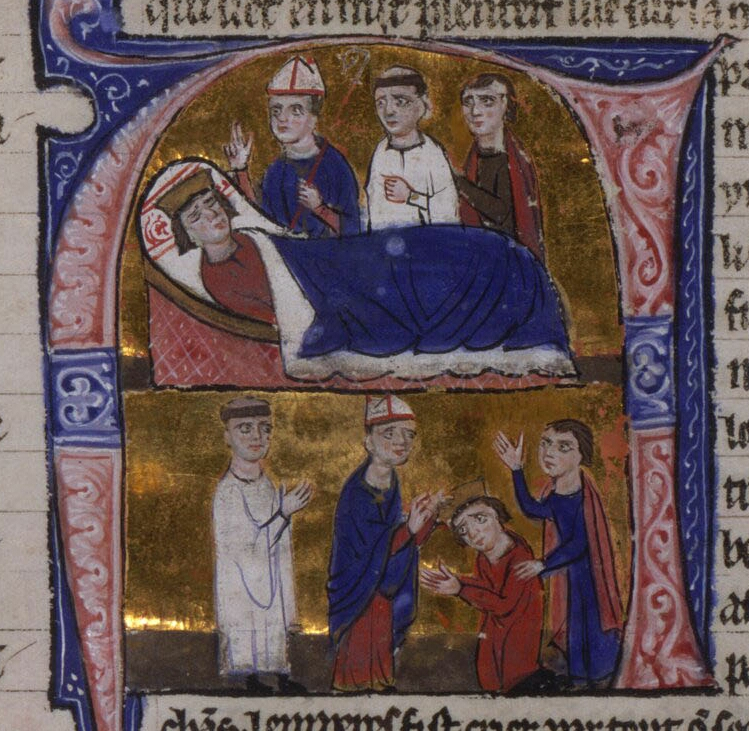
Death of John II Komnenos, and crowning of Manuel I Komnenos (from the Manuscript of William of Tyre's Historia and Old French Continuation, painted in Acre, 13th century, Bibliothèque nationale de France)

In 1143 John II lay dying as a result of an infected wound sustained in a hunting accident; on his deathbed he chose Manuel as his successor, in preference to his elder surviving brother Isaac. John cited Manuel's courage and readiness to take advice, in contrast to Isaac's irascibility and unbending pride, as the reasons for his choice. After John died on 8 April 1143, Manuel was acclaimed emperor by the armies. Manuel needed to assure his succession in Constantinople, and therefore needed to leave Cilicia, take care of any rival claimants, arrange his father's funeral and build a monastery at his death place as per tradition. Manuel dispatched the megas domestikos John Axouch ahead of him, to arrest the most dangerous potential rival, his brother Isaac, who had direct access to the treasury and regalia as he lived in the Great Palace. Next, Axouch secured the support of the Patriarchate by promising an annual 200 silver pieces to the clergy of Hagia Sophia. Manuel entered the capital in mid-August 1143, and was crowned by the new patriarch, Michael II Kourkouas. Then he ordered two golden pieces to be given to every household in Constantinople and gave another 200 pounds of gold to the church. A few days later, as his position was now secure, Manuel ordered the release of Isaac.

The first test of Manuel's reign came in 1144, when he had to deal with Crusader prince of Antioch Raymond, who had damaged Byzantine cities. Manuel dispatched a fleet under Demetrios Branas that, with the Kontostephanoi, regained lost fortifications, devastated the land around Antioch and destroyed Raymond's ships. When Raymond was threatened by Imad ad-Din Zengi's takeover of the Crusader county of Edessa at the end of the year, he swallowed his pride and travelled to Constantinople and submitted to Manuel. The loss of Edessa had alarmed Western Europe, and another crusade was planned.

== Expedition to Ikonion ==
In 1146 Manuel assembled his army at the military base Lopadion and set out on a punitive expedition against Masud, the Sultan of Rûm, who had been repeatedly violating the frontiers of the Empire in western Anatolia and Cilicia. There was no attempt at a systematic conquest of territory, but Manuel's army defeated the Turks at Akroinοn, before capturing and destroying the fortified town of Philomelion, removing its remaining Christian population. The Byzantine forces reached Masud's capital, Ikonion (Konya), and in one instance Manuel led a charge and was lured away from the main army which was ambushed by two thirds of Masud's army. It was deemed impossible to besiege Ikonion, either due to the fortification strength, the previous ambush that may have damaged siege capability and prevented coherent operation, or as Kinnamos claims, the diversion in the news of a coming Crusader army. While retreating and camping at Tzibrelitzemani, Masud attacked, and Manuel organized the army and took a vanguard which engaged a Turk advance guard of 500, that led to the risk of complete encirclement, only to be saved by the main Byzantine army. Manuel now just wanted to return safely to Constantinople, as any pitched battle was unwanted by the Turks. In the summer of 1146, during the expedition, Manuel received a letter from Louis VII of France asking him to support the coming crusade.

== Arrival of the Crusaders ==
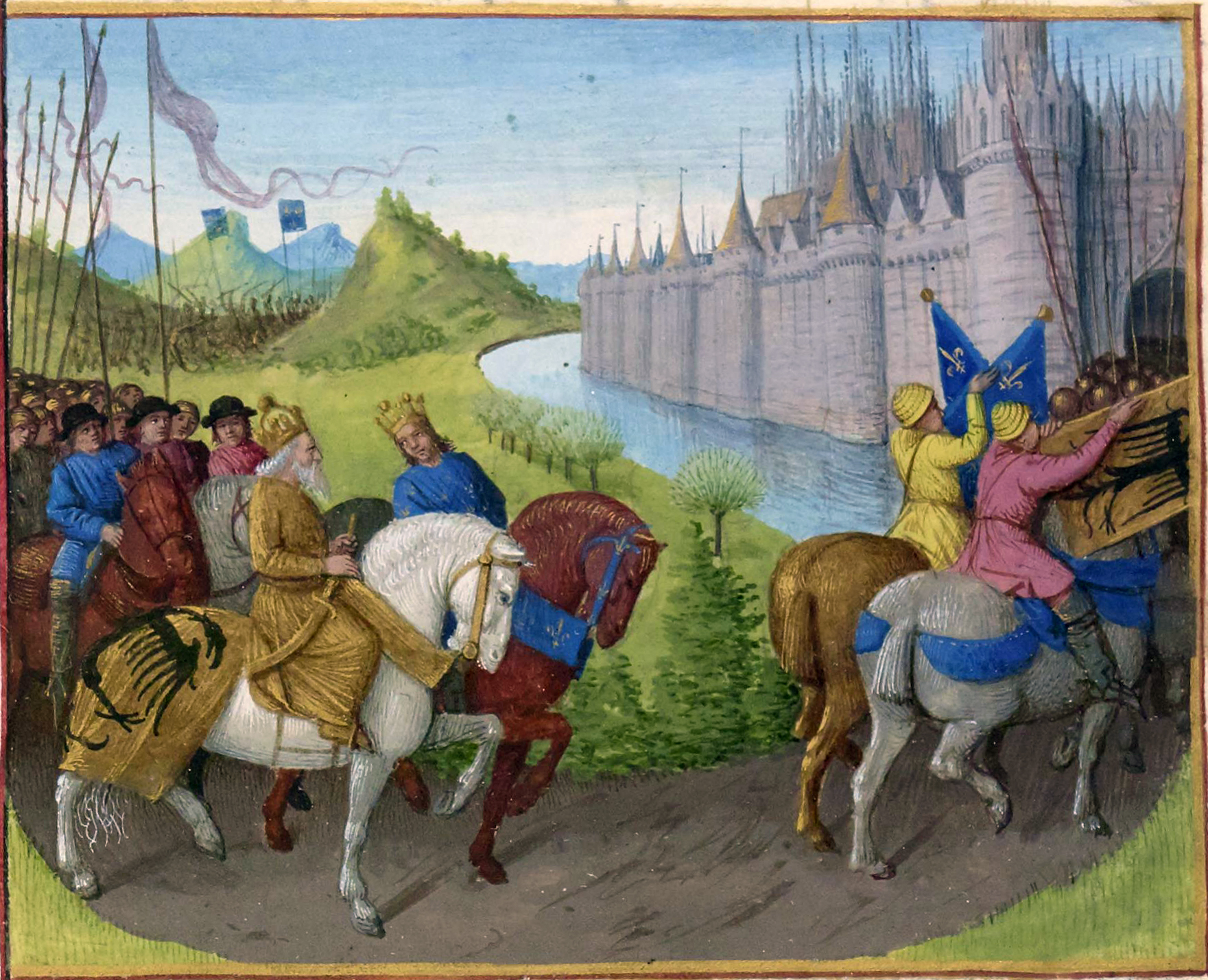
Arrival of the Second Crusade before Constantinople, portrayed in Jean Fouquet's painting from c. 1455–1460.

Manuel replied to Louis VII that he would provide supplies to the Crusader armies, but that they had to pay for everything and swear fealty to the Byzantine emperor when crossing the territory. Repairs were made to the Walls of Constantinople. The Byzantines hoped the Crusaders would be better than those of the First Crusade, which was a nightmare for the empire, but the German Crusader army that set out in May 1147 murdered, pillaged and raped as soon as they entered Byzantine lands. Conrad III of Germany behaved with dignity, but his nephew Frederick Barbarossa burnt down a monastery and killed its monks. Byzantine–German relations soured when Conrad decided to cross the capital instead of using the Hellespont (as Manuel had requested) in mid-September 1147. There was a clash which left many German casualties. An appraisal (enkomion) to Manuel attributed to Theodore Prodromos, likely an imperial commission, accused Conrad of wanting to take Constantinople by force, and to install a Latin patriarch, showing the mood that prevailed. The French Crusader army, more disciplined than the German, entered the Balkans where the peasantry had become hostile, and sold overpriced food. The French now came to resent both Germans and Greeks, and thought it was a scandal when they arrived in October and heard that Manuel just brokered truce with the Turks. Some elements in the Crusader armies sought to attack Constantinople, but reports of Turk mustering in Anatolia ensured their hastily exit.

In time, Manuel learned that the German army had been decimated at Dorylaeum and that Roger II of Sicily had sailed against the empire.

== Roger II of Sicily and alliance with Conrad ==
In 1147 Manuel was faced with war by Roger II of Sicily, whose fleet had captured the Byzantine island of Corfu and plundered Thebes and Corinth. However, despite being distracted by a Cuman attack in the Balkans, in 1148 Manuel enlisted the alliance of Conrad III of Germany, and the help of the Venetians, who quickly defeated Roger with their powerful fleet. Manuel was married with Conrad's sister-in-law Bertha of Sulzbach and persuaded him against Roger. In 1149, Manuel recovered Corfu and prepared to take the offensive against the Normans, while Roger II sent George of Antioch with a fleet of 40 ships to pillage Constantinople's suburbs. Manuel had already agreed with Conrad on a joint invasion and partition of southern Italy and Sicily. The renewal of the German alliance remained the principal orientation of Manuel's foreign policy for the rest of his reign, despite the gradual divergence of interests between the two empires after Conrad's death.

== Serbia and Hungary (1149–1155) ==
In the two decades following the Byzantine–Hungarian War (1127–1129), Byzantine relations with its Serbian vassals and Hungary were positive. Upon succeeding the throne, Manuel sought to preserve the status quo in Hungary. In 1149, the Serbians raided Byzantine territory, encouraged by Roger II of Norman Sicily, while Manuel I was preoccupied with the Siege of Corfu. The Serbian revolt had come as a shock, and it exposed Byzantine weaknesses in the control of the Balkans and in diplomacy. In 1149, Manuel I's army ravaged Serbian territory but was however unable to pursue the Serbs into the mountains and returned home to try again the next year. In 1150, Manuel's army defeated the Serbs under Uroš II who were supported by a Hungarian detachment sent by Geza II, due to which Manuel made a punitive expedition into Hungary, taking Zemun.

== Italy, Papal-Byzantine alliance ==
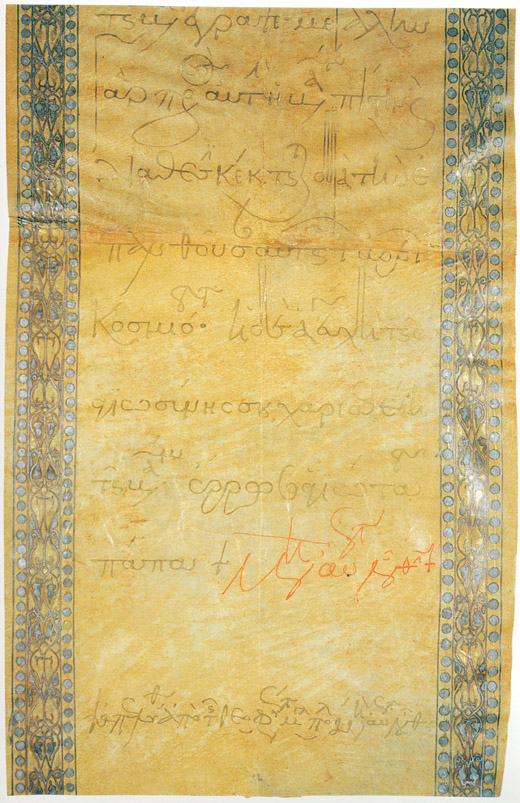
Letter by Manuel I Komnenos to Pope Eugene III on the issue of the crusades (Constantinople, 1146, Vatican Secret Archives): with this document, the Emperor answers a previous papal letter asking Louis VII of France to free the Holy Land and reconquer Edessa. Manuel answers that he is willing to receive the French army and to support it, but he complains about receiving the letter from an envoy of the King of France and not from an ambassador sent by the Pope.

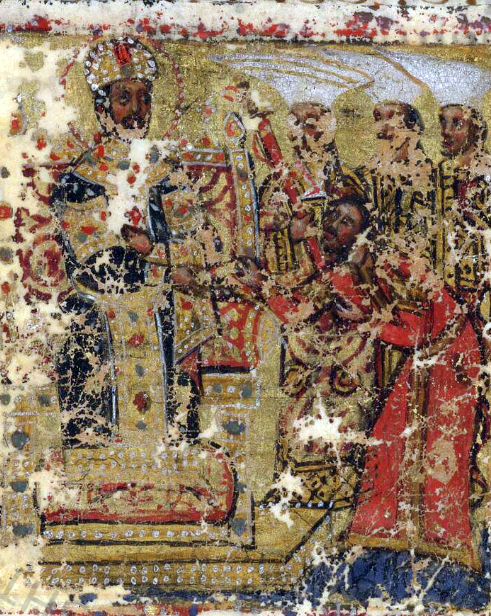
Miniature of Emperor Manuel I Komnenos ca. 1179, Vatican Library

Unfortunately for the Byzantine emperor, Conrad died in 1152, and despite repeated attempts, Manuel could not reach an agreement with his successor, Frederick Barbarossa. Manuel's primary goal was a partition of Italy with the German empire, in which Byzantium would get the Adriatic coast. This antagonized Frederick, whose own plans for imperial restoration ruled out any partnership with Byzantium. Manuel was thus obliged to treat Frederick as his main enemy, and to form a web of relationships with other western powers, including the Papacy, his old enemy, the Norman kingdom, Hungary, several magnates and cities throughout Italy, and, above all, the crusader states.

Roger died in February 1154 and was succeeded by William I, who faced widespread rebellions against his rule in Sicily and Apulia, leading to the presence of Apulian refugees at the Byzantine court. Conrad's successor, Frederick Barbarossa, launched a campaign against the Normans, but his expedition stalled. These developments encouraged Manuel to take advantage of the multiple instabilities on the Italian Peninsula. He sent Michael Palaiologos and John Doukas, both of whom held the high imperial rank of sebastos, with Byzantine troops, ten ships and large quantities of gold to invade Apulia in 1155. The two generals were instructed to enlist the support of Frederick, but he declined because his demoralised army longed to get back north of the Alps as soon as possible. Nevertheless, with the help of disaffected local barons, including Count Robert of Loritello, Manuel's expedition achieved astonishingly rapid progress as the whole of southern Italy rose up in rebellion against the Sicilian Crown and the untried William I. There followed a string of spectacular successes as numerous strongholds yielded either to force or the lure of gold.

The city of Bari, which had been the capital of the Byzantine Catepanate of Italy for centuries before the arrival of the Normans, opened its gates to the Emperor's army, and the overjoyed citizens tore down the Norman citadel. After the fall of Bari, the cities of Trani, Giovinazzo, Andria, Taranto and Brindisi were also captured. William arrived with his army, including 2,000 knights, but was heavily defeated.

Encouraged by the success, Manuel dreamed of the restoration of the Roman Empire, at the cost of union between the Orthodox and the Catholic Church, a prospect which would frequently be offered to the Pope during negotiations and plans for alliance. If there was ever a chance of reuniting the eastern and western churches, and coming to reconciliation with the Pope permanently, this was probably the most favourable moment. The Papacy was never on good terms with the Normans, except when under duress by the threat of direct military action. Having the "civilised" Byzantines on its southern border was infinitely preferable to the Papacy than having to constantly deal with the troublesome Normans of Sicily. It was in the interest of Pope Adrian IV to reach a deal if at all possible, since doing so would greatly increase his own influence over the entire Orthodox Christian population. Manuel offered a large sum of money to the Pope for the provision of troops, with the request that the Pope grant the Byzantine emperor lordship of three maritime cities in return for assistance in expelling William from Sicily. Manuel also promised to pay 5,000 pounds of gold to the Pope and the Curia. Negotiations were hurriedly carried out, and an alliance was formed between Manuel and Hadrian.

Alexios Komnenos and Doukas ... had become captive to the Normans' lord [and] again ruined matters. For as they had already pledged to the Sicilians many things not then desired by the emperor, they robbed the Romans of very great and noble achievements. [They] ... very likely deprived the Roman of the cities too soon.

— John Kinnamos

At this point, just as the war seemed decided in his favour, events turned against Manuel. Byzantine commander Michael Palaiologos alienated allies with his attitude, stalling the campaign as Count Robert III of Loritello refused to speak to him. Although the two were reconciled, the campaign had lost some of its momentum: Michael was soon recalled to Constantinople, and his loss was a major blow to the campaign. The turning point was the Battle of Brindisi, where the Normans launched a major counter-attack by both land and sea. At the approach of the enemy, the mercenaries that had been hired with Manuel's gold demanded huge increases in their pay. When this was refused, they deserted. Even the local barons started to melt away, and soon John Doukas was left hopelessly outnumbered. The arrival of Alexios Komnenos Bryennios with some empty ships, and no soldiers, failed to aid the Byzantine position. The naval battle was decided in favour of the Normans, while John Doukas and Alexios Bryennios (along with four Byzantine ships) were captured. Manuel then sent Alexios Axouch to Ancona to raise another army, but by this time William had already retaken all of the Byzantine conquests in Apulia. The defeat at Brindisi put an end to the restored Byzantine reign in Italy; in 1158 the Byzantine army left Italy and never returned again. Both Nicetas Choniates and Kinnamos, the major Byzantine historians of this period, agree, however, that the peace terms Axouch secured from William allowed Manuel to extricate himself from the war with dignity, despite a devastating raid by a Norman fleet of 164 ships (carrying 10,000 men) on Euboea and Almira in 1156.

During the Italian campaign, and afterwards, during the struggle of the Papal Curia with Frederick, Manuel tried to sway the popes with hints of a possible union between the Eastern and Western churches. Although in 1155 Pope Adrian IV had expressed his eagerness to prompt the reunion of the churches by sending legates to Manuel, hopes for a lasting Papal-Byzantine alliance came up against insuperable problems. Adrian IV and his successors demanded recognition of their religious authority over all Christians everywhere and sought superiority over the Byzantine emperor; they were not willing to be dependendent on any monarch. Manuel, on the other hand, wanted official recognition of his secular authority over both East and West. Such conditions would not be accepted by either side. Even if a pro-western emperor such as Manuel agreed, the Orthodox citizens of the empire would have outright rejected any union (as was the case three centuries later). In spite of his friendliness and cordial relations with the Papacy, Manuel was never honoured with the title of augustus by the popes. And although he twice sent embassies to Pope Alexander III (in 1167 and 1169) offering church union, Alexander refused, under pretext of the troubles that would follow it.

The final results of the Italian campaign were limited in terms of the advantages gained by the Empire. The city of Ancona became a Byzantine base in Italy, accepting Manuel as sovereign. The Normans of Sicily had been damaged and now came to terms with the Empire, ensuring peace for the rest of Manuel's reign. The Empire's ability to get involved in Italian affairs had been demonstrated. However, given the enormous quantities of gold which had been lavished on the project, it also demonstrated the limits of what money and diplomacy alone could achieve. The expense of Manuel's involvement in Italy must have cost the treasury a great deal (probably more than 2.16 million hyperpyra or 30,000 pounds of gold), and yet it produced only limited solid gains.

After 1158, under the new conditions, the aims of the Byzantine policy changed. Manuel now decided to oppose Frederick Barbarossa's objective to directly annex Italy. When the war between Frederick and the northern Italian communes started, Manuel actively supported the Lombard League with money subsidies, agents, and, occasionally, troops. The walls of Milan, demolished by the Germans, were restored with Manuel's aid. Ancona remained important as a centre of Byzantine influence in Italy. The Anconitans voluntarily submitted to Manuel, and the Byzantines maintained representatives in the city. Frederick's defeat at the Battle of Legnano, on 29 May 1176, seemed rather to improve Manuel's position in Italy. According to Kinnamos, Cremona, Pavia and a number of other "Ligurian" cities went over to Manuel; his relations were also particularly favourable in regard to Genoa and Pisa, but not to Venice. In March 1171 Manuel had suddenly broken with Venice, ordering all 20,000 Venetians on imperial territory to be arrested and their property confiscated, due partly to Venetian abuse of trade privileges. Venice, incensed, sent a fleet of 120 ships against Byzantium. Due to an epidemic, and pursued by 150 Byzantine ships, the fleet was forced to return without great success.

== Hungary and the Rus' (1160s) ==
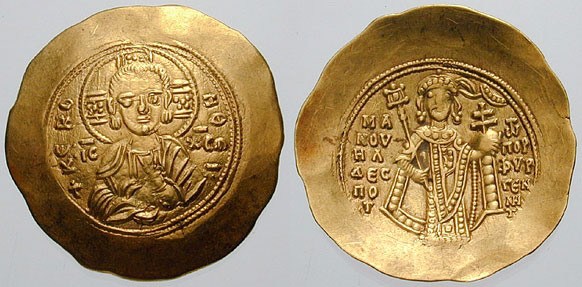
A hyperpyron, a Byzantine gold coin, issued by Manuel. One side of the coin (left image) depicts Christ. The other side depicts Manuel (right image).

The campaigns into Hungary yielded substantial war booty. In 1167, Manuel sent 15,000 men under the command of Andronikos Kontostephanos against the Hungarians, scoring a decisive victory at Sirmium and enabling the Empire to conclude a very advantageous peace with Hungary by which Syrmia, Bosnia and Dalmatia were ceded. By 1168 nearly the whole of the eastern Adriatic coast lay in Manuel's hands.

Efforts were also made towards a diplomatic annexation of Hungary. The Hungarian heir Béla, younger brother of the Hungarian king Stephen III, was sent to Constantinople to be educated in the emperor's court. Manuel intended the youth to marry his daughter, Maria, and to make him his heir, thus securing the union of Hungary with the Empire. At court Béla assumed the name Alexius and received the title of despot, which had previously been applied only to the emperor himself. However, two unforeseen dynastic events drastically altered the situation. In 1169, Manuel's young wife gave birth to a son, thus depriving Béla of his status as heir of the Byzantine throne (although Manuel would not renounce the Croatian lands he had taken from Hungary). Then, in 1172, Stephen died childless, and Béla went home to take his throne. Before leaving Constantinople, he swore a solemn oath to Manuel that he would always "keep in mind the interests of the emperor and of the Romans". Béla III kept his word: as long as Manuel lived, he made no attempt to retrieve his Croatian inheritance, which he only afterwards reincorporated into Hungary.

Manuel Komnenos attempted to draw the Russian principalities into his net of diplomacy directed against Hungary, and to a lesser extent Norman Sicily. This polarised the Russian princes into pro- and anti-Byzantine camps. In the late 1140s three princes were competing for primacy in Russia: prince Iziaslav II of Kiev was related to Géza II of Hungary and was hostile to Byzantium; Prince Yuri Dolgoruki of Suzdal was Manuel's ally (symmachos), and Vladimirko of Galicia (Principality of Halych) is described as Manuel's vassal (hypospondos). Galicia bordered Hungary and was therefore of great strategic importance. Following the deaths of both Iziaslav and Vladimirko, the situation became reversed; when Yuri of Suzdal, Manuel's ally, took over Kiev and Yaroslav, he instead adopted a pro-Hungarian stance. In 1164–65 Manuel's cousin Andronikos, the future emperor, escaped from captivity in Byzantium and fled to the court of Yaroslav in Galicia. Alarmed by the prospect of Andronikos' ousting Manuel with Galicia and Hungary, Manuel pardoned and persuaded him to return to Constantinople in 1165. A mission to Kiev, then ruled by Prince Rostislav, resulted in a favourable treaty and a pledge to supply the Empire with auxiliary troops; Yaroslav of Galicia was also persuaded to renounce his Hungarian connections and return fully into the imperial fold.

The restoration of relations with Galicia had an immediate benefit for Manuel when, in 1166, he dispatched two armies to attack the eastern provinces of Hungary in a vast pincer movement. One army crossed the Wallachian Plain and entered Hungary through the Transylvanian Alps (Southern Carpathians), while the other army made a wide circuit to Galicia and, with Galician aid, crossed the Carpathian Mountains. Since the Hungarians had most of their forces concentrated on the Sirmium and Belgrade frontier, they were caught off guard by the Byzantine invasion; this resulted in the Hungarian province of Transylvania being thoroughly ravaged by the Byzantine armies.

== Cyprus, Cilicia, Antioch ==
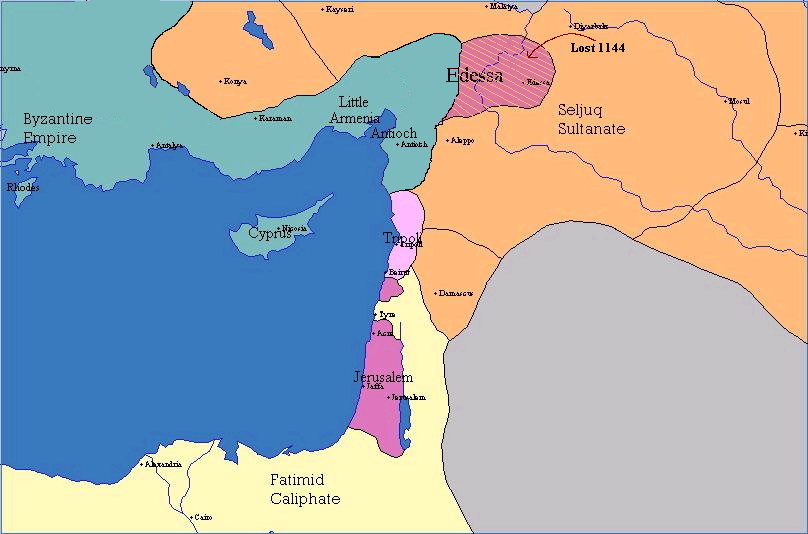
Antioch under Byzantine protection (1159–1180).

Manuel's attention was again drawn to Antioch in 1156, when Raynald of Châtillon, the new Prince of Antioch, claimed that the Byzantine emperor had reneged on his promise to pay him a sum of money and attacked the Byzantine province of Cyprus. Raynald arrested the governor of the island, John Komnenos, who was a nephew of Manuel, and the general Michael Branas. Having ransacked the island and plundered all its wealth, Raynald's army mutilated the survivors before forcing them to buy back their flocks at exorbitant prices with what little they had left, and they returned to Antioch wealthy. Raynald sent some of the mutilated hostages to Constantinople to demonstrate his disobedience and contempt for the Byzantine emperor. The Latin historian William of Tyre deplored this act of war against fellow Christians and described the atrocities committed by Raynald's men in considerable detail.

Manuel responded to this outrage in a characteristically energetic way. In the winter of 1158–59, he marched to Cilicia at the head of a huge army; the speed of his advance (Manuel had hurried on ahead of the main army with 500 cavalry) was such that he managed to surprise the Armenian Thoros of Cilicia, who had participated in the attack on Cyprus. Thoros fled into the mountains, and Cilicia swiftly fell to Manuel. Manuel also likely used this campaign to re-assert Roman hegemony in Isauria along the way, something that his father had established on his eastern campaigns in 1137-38 and 1142-43.

Meanwhile, news of the advance of the Byzantine army soon reached Antioch. Raynald knew that he had no hope of defeating the emperor, and in addition knew that he could not expect any aid from King Baldwin III of Jerusalem. Baldwin did not approve of Raynald's attack on Cyprus, and in any case had already made an agreement with Manuel. Thus isolated and abandoned by his allies, Raynald decided that abject submission was his only hope. He appeared dressed in a sack with a rope tied around his neck, and begged for forgiveness. Manuel at first ignored the prostrate Raynald, chatting with his courtiers; William of Tyre commented that this ignominious scene continued for so long that all present were "disgusted" by it. Eventually, Manuel forgave Raynald on condition that he would become a vassal of the Empire, effectively surrendering the independence of Antioch to Byzantium. Coming before Manuel as a supplicant Raynald limited the emperor's options for punishment, and by submitting to Byzantium, the increasing pressure on Antioch from Baldwin III was relieved.

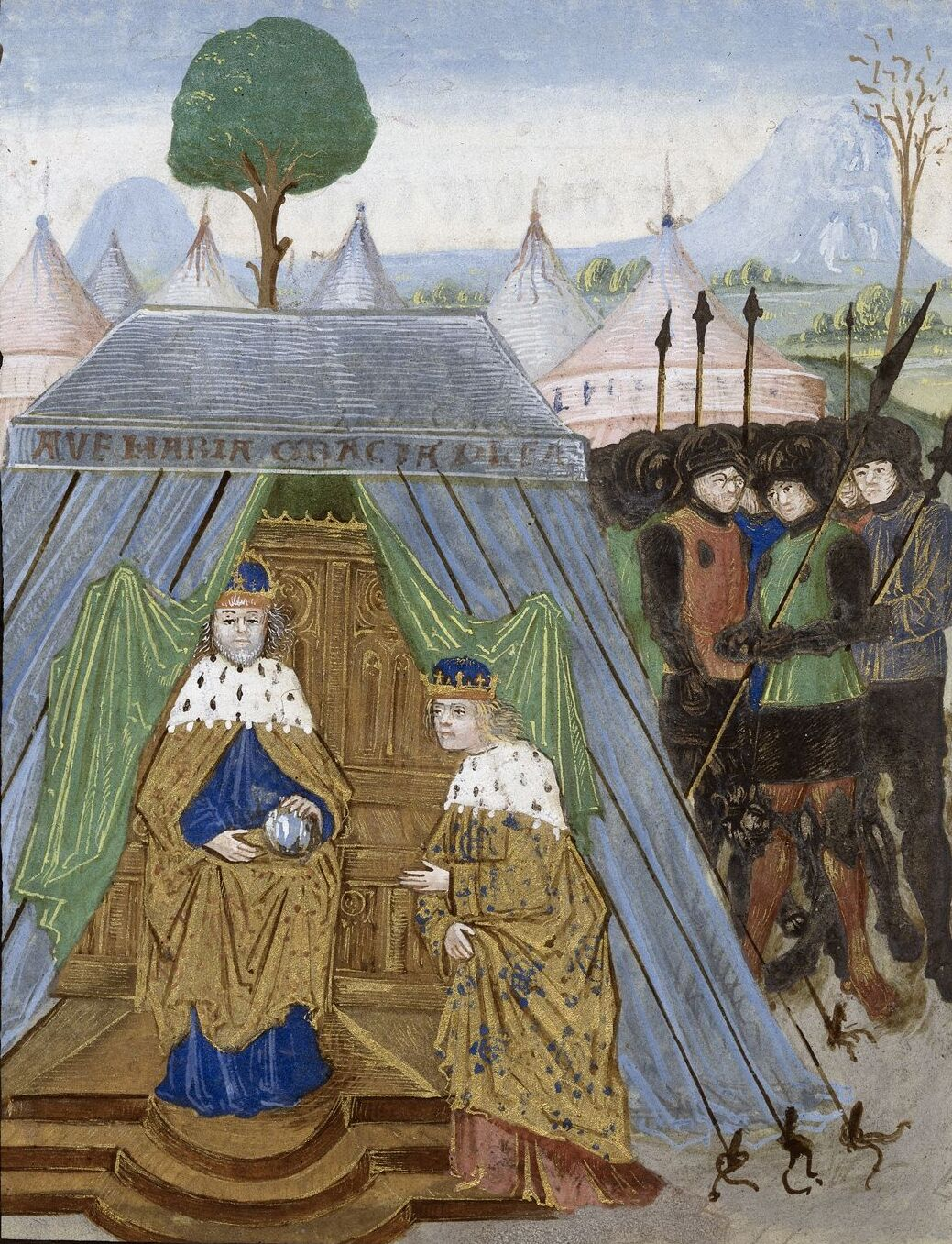
Miniature of Baldwin III visiting Manuel Komnenos

Peace having been restored, a grand ceremonial procession was staged on 12 April 1159 for the triumphant entry of the Byzantine army into the city, with Manuel riding through the streets on horseback, while the Prince of Antioch and the King of Jerusalem followed on foot. Manuel dispensed justice to the citizens and presided over games and tournaments for the crowd. In May, at the head of a united Christian army, he started on the road to Edessa, but he abandoned the campaign when he secured the release by Nur ad-Din, the ruler of Syria, of 6,000 Christian prisoners captured in various battles since the second Crusade. Despite the glorious end of the expedition, modern scholars argue that Manuel ultimately achieved much less than he had desired in terms of imperial restoration.

Upon hearing rumours of conspiracies, Manuel headed back to Constantinople at a rush. He attempted to negotiate passage through the Sultanate of Rum but this was denied by Kilij Arslan II. Manuel proceeded anyway and when the army was nearly back in Byzantine territory near Kotyaion, the army was attacked by Seljuk forces. Manuel's passage through Seljuk territory started the 1159-1160 Seljuk-Byzantine war, and may have been intended to force the relatively new sultan into a client relationship with the empire.

== Jerusalem and Egypt ==
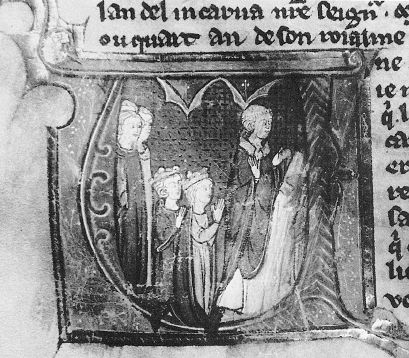
The marriage of Amalric I of Jerusalem and Maria Comnena at Tyre in 1167 (from a manuscript of William of Tyre's Historia, painted in Paris c. 1295 – 1300, Bibliothèque Municipale, Épinal).

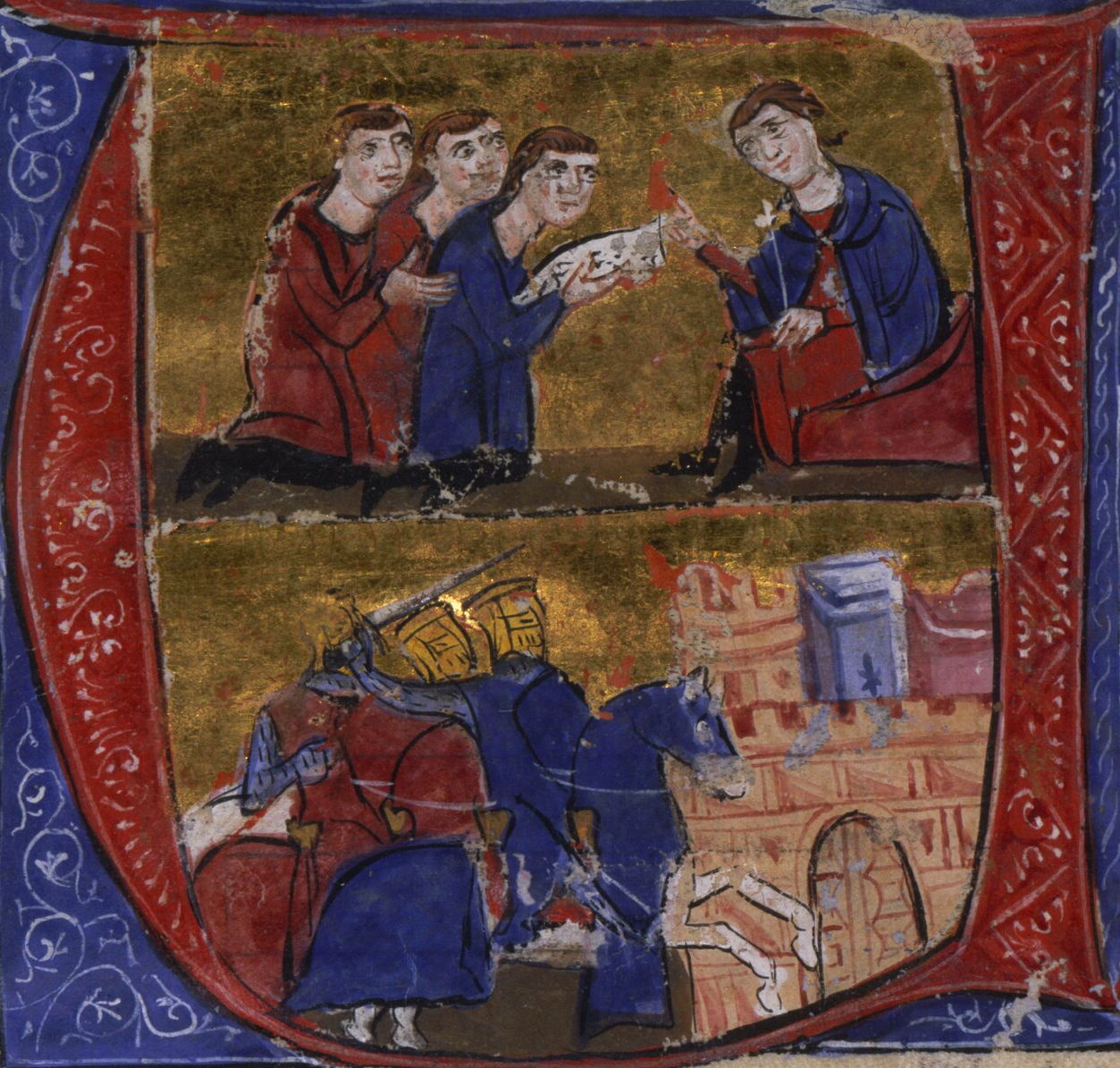
Manuel and the envoys of Amalric – arrival of the crusaders in Pelusium (from the Manuscript of William of Tyre's Historia and Old French Continuation, painted in Acre, 13th century, Bibliothèque nationale de France).

Control of Egypt was a decades-old dream of the crusader Kingdom of Jerusalem, and its king Amalric I needed all the military and financial support he could get for his planned campaign. Amalric also realised that if he were to pursue his ambitions in Egypt, he might have to leave Antioch to the hegemony of Manuel, who had paid 100,000 dinars for the release of Bohemond III. In 1165, he sent envoys to the Byzantine court to negotiate a marriage alliance (Manuel had already married Amalric's cousin Maria of Antioch in 1161). After a long interval of two years, Amalric married Manuel's grandniece Maria Komnene in 1167, and "swore all that his brother Baldwin had sworn before", this probably meant that Amalric repeated Baldwin's assurances regarding the status of Antioch as an imperial fief. A formal alliance was negotiated in 1168, whereby the two rulers arranged for a conquest and partition of Egypt, with Manuel taking the coastal area, and Amalric the interior. In the autumn of 1169 Manuel sent a joint expedition with Amalric to Egypt: a Byzantine army and a naval force of 20 large warships, 150 galleys, and 60 transports, under the command of the megas doux Andronikos Kontostephanos, joined forces with Amalric at Ascalon. William of Tyre, who negotiated the alliance, was impressed in particular by the large transport ships that were used to transport the cavalry forces of the army.

Although such a long-range attack on a state far from the centre of the Empire may seem extraordinary (the last time the Empire had attempted anything on this scale was the failed invasion of Sicily over one hundred and twenty years earlier), it can be explained in terms of Manuel's foreign policy, which was to use the Latins to ensure the survival of the Empire. This focus on the bigger picture of the eastern Mediterranean and even further afield thus led Manuel to intervene in Egypt: it was believed that in the context of the wider struggle between the crusader states and the Islamic powers of the east, control of Egypt would be the deciding factor. It had become clear that the ailing Fatimid Caliphate of Egypt held the key to the fate of the crusader states. If Egypt came out of its isolation and joined forces with the Muslims under Nur ad-Din, the crusader cause was in trouble.

A successful invasion of Egypt would have several further advantages for the Byzantine Empire. Egypt was a rich province, and in the days of the Roman Empire it had supplied much of the grain for Constantinople before it was lost to the Arabs in the 7th century. The revenues that the Empire could have expected to gain from the conquest of Egypt would have been considerable, even if these would have to be shared with the Crusaders. Furthermore, Manuel may have wanted to encourage Amalric's plans, not only to deflect the ambitions of the Latins away from Antioch, but also to create new opportunities for joint military ventures that would keep the King of Jerusalem in his debt, and would also allow the Empire to share in territorial gains.

The joined forces of Manuel and Amalric laid siege to Damietta on 27 October 1169, but the siege was unsuccessful due to the failure of the Crusaders and the Byzantines to co-operate fully. According to Byzantine forces, Amalric, not wanting to share the profits of victory, dragged out the operation until the emperor's men ran short of provisions and were particularly affected by famine; Amalric then launched an assault, which he promptly aborted by negotiating a truce with the defenders. On the other hand, William of Tyre remarked that the Greeks were not entirely blameless. Whatever the truth of the allegations of both sides, when the rains came, both the Latin army and the Byzantine fleet returned home, although half of the Byzantine fleet was lost in a sudden storm.

Despite the bad feelings generated at Damietta, Amalric still refused to abandon his dream of conquering Egypt, and he continued to seek good relations with the Byzantines in the hopes of another joined attack, which never took place. In 1171 Amalric came to Constantinople in person, after Egypt had fallen to Saladin. Manuel was thus able to organise a grand ceremonial reception which both honoured Amalric and underlined his dependence: for the rest of Amalric's reign, Jerusalem was a Byzantine satellite, and Manuel was able to act as a protector of the Holy Places, exerting a growing influence in the Kingdom of Jerusalem. In 1177, a fleet of 150 ships was sent by Manuel I to invade Egypt, but returned home after appearing off Acre due to the refusal of Count Philip of Flanders and many important nobles of the Kingdom of Jerusalem to help.

== Seljuk Turks ==
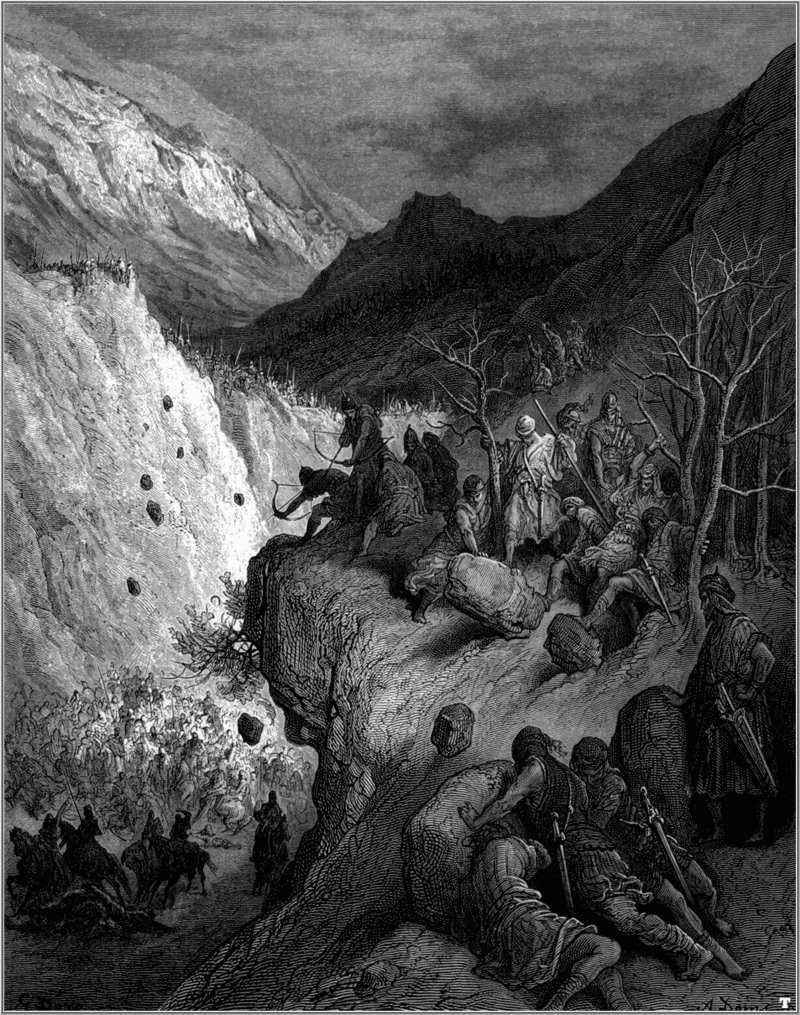
This image by Gustave Doré shows the Turkish ambush at the pass of Myriokephalon. This ambush destroyed Manuel's hope of capturing Konya

Manuel's father John II Komnenos had kept the Sultanate of Rum in check and within the Byzantine orbit, although the sultan Mas'ud had become increasingly assertive in the second half of the 1130s. Manuel had engaged in a punitive expedition against Konya in 1146 to secure his position as John's successor among the aristocrats and army. The accession of Kilij Arslan II to the sultanate in 1156 did not technically change the state of Seljuk submission to the empire, although in practice the new sultan was untried and had yet to come to any agreement with Manuel. In spring 1159, news of conspiracies in the capital reached the emperor and he decided he had to return from Antioch, seeking to take the fastest route through Turk territory but Arslan denied it. Manuel's army made the march anyway, intending to accomplish two goals at once: re-assert nominal lordship over the sultanate, and return to Constantinople via the faster, easier route. The Turks were taken by surprise, but by the time the army reached the border area around Kotyaion, they were prepared and attacked Manuel's column. The scale of the attack is impossible to determine, but it was at least significant enough that Manuel felt the need to avenge it. Kilij Arslan dispatched ambassadors to make peace but Manuel rebuffed them and personally led two raids against the Sultanate. The sultan then escalated the conflict by sacking Laodikeia, a key communications hub in the upper Meander valley. Manuel prepared a major campaign to take Seljuk capital Ikonion (Konya), and John Kontostephanos was dispatched to raise troops from Cilicia and a nominal contingent from the crusader states. Kontostephanos led these troops against the Sultanate from the south and won a victory. Preferring to leave a compliant Sultanate on the plateau rather than administer it directly, Manuel called off the campaign against Ikonion and in either 1160 or 1161 Arslan came to Constantinople to pay homage and secure peace.

Kilij Arslan II used the peace with Byzantium and the power vacuum caused by the death in 1174 of Nur ad-Din Zangi, the ruler of Syria, to expel the Danishmends from Anatolia. When Arslan refused to cede some of the conquered Danishmend territory to the Byzantines, as obliged per treaty, Manuel decided to destroy the Seljuk Turks, marching against Ikonion. Manuel's army of 35,000 men was large and unwieldy—according to a letter that Manuel sent to King Henry II of England, the advancing column was ten miles (16 km) long. Just outside Myriokephalon, Manuel was offered generous peace by Turk ambassadors, which most of his generals and experienced courtiers supported, except the younger and more aggressive court members who urged Manuel to attack. He took the latter's advice and continued the advance. He failed to properly scout the route, and this caused his army to fall into an ambush, hemmed in by the narrowness of the pass, which allowed the Seljuks to concentrate their attacks on part of the Byzantine army, especially the baggage and siege train, without the rest being able to intervene. The army's siege equipment was quickly destroyed, and Manuel was forced to withdraw—without siege engines, the conquest of Ikonion was impossible. According to Byzantine sources, Manuel lost his nerve both during and after the battle, fluctuating between extremes of self-delusion and self-abasement; according to William of Tyre, he was never the same again. The defeat at Myriokephalon has often been depicted as a catastrophe in which the entire Byzantine army was destroyed. Manuel himself compared the defeat to Manzikert; it seemed to him that the Byzantine defeat at Myriokephalon complemented the destruction at Manzikert. In reality, although a defeat, it was not particularly costly and did not significantly diminish the fighting ability of the Byzantine army. Most of the casualties were borne by the right wing largely composed of allied troops commanded by Baldwin of Antioch, and the baggage train, which was the main target of the ambush.

The terms by which Kilij Arslan II allowed Manuel and his army to leave were that he should remove his frontier forts and garrisons at Dorylaeum and Sublaeum. Since the Sultan had already failed to keep his side of the earlier treaty of 1162, however, Manuel only ordered the fortifications of Sublaeum to be dismantled, but not the fortifications of Dorylaeum. Nevertheless, defeat at Myriokephalon was an embarrassment for both Manuel personally and also for his empire. The Komnenian emperors had worked hard since the Battle of Manzikert, over a century earlier, to restore the reputation of the empire. Yet because of his overconfidence, Manuel had demonstrated to the world that Byzantium still could not decisively defeat the Seljuks, despite the advances made during the past century. In Western opinion, Myriokephalon cut Manuel down to a humbler size: not that of Emperor of the Romans but that of King of the Greeks.

The limited losses inflicted on native Byzantine troops were quickly recovered, and in the following year Manuel's forces defeated a force of "picked Turks". John Komnenos Vatatzes, who was sent by the Emperor to repel the Turk invasion, not only brought troops from the capital but also was able to gather an army along the way. Vatatzes caught the Turks in an ambush as they were crossing the Meander River; the subsequent Battle of Hyelion and Leimocheir effectively destroyed them as a fighting force. This is an indication that the Byzantine army remained strong and that the defensive program of western Asia Minor was still successful. After the victory on the Meander, Manuel himself advanced with a small army to drive the Turks from Panasium, south of Cotyaeum.

In 1178, however, a Byzantine army retreated after encountering a Turk force at Charax, allowing the Turks to capture many livestock. The city of Claudiopolis in Bithynia was besieged by the Turks in 1179, forcing Manuel to lead a small cavalry force to save the city, and then, even as late as 1180, the Byzantines succeeded in scoring a victory over the Turks.

The continuous warfare had a serious effect upon Manuel's vitality; he declined in health and in 1180 succumbed to a slow fever. Furthermore, like Manzikert, the balance between the two powers began to gradually shift—Manuel never again attacked the Turks, and after his death they began to move further west, deeper into Byzantine territory.

== Family ==
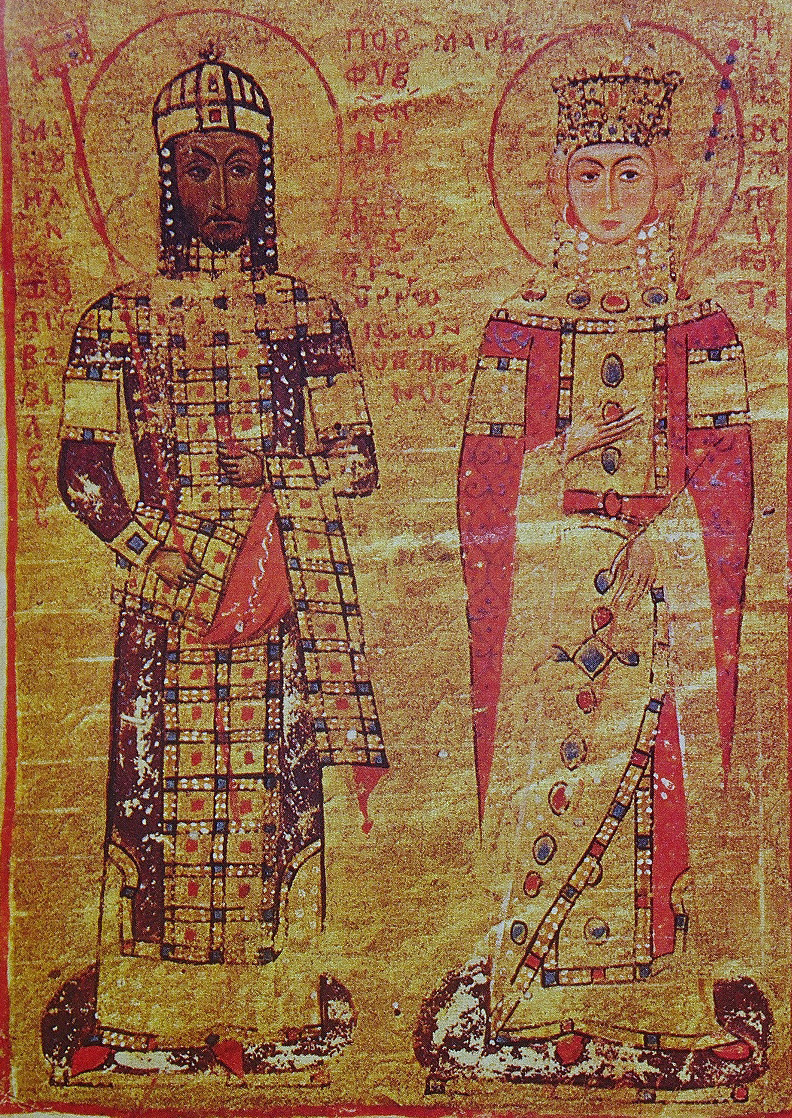
Manuscript miniature of Maria of Antioch with Manuel I Komnenos, Vatican Library, Rome

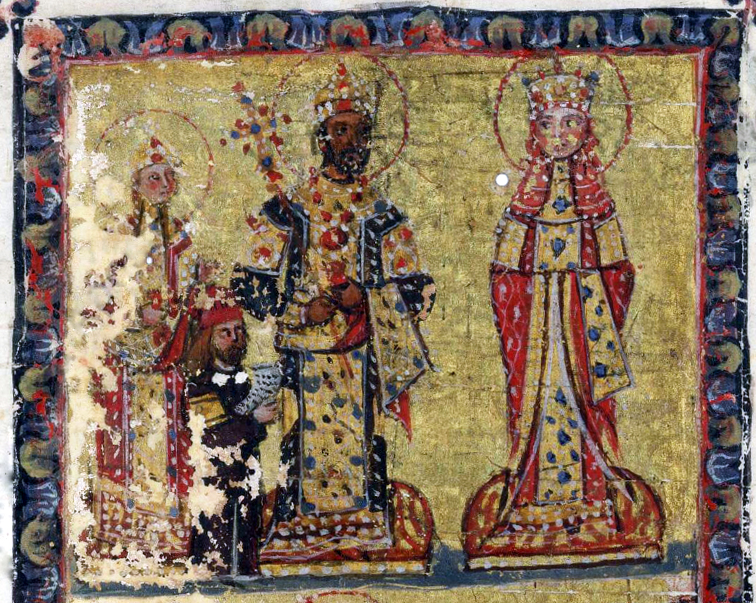
Illuminated manuscript possibly depicting Manuel I Komnenos with Maria of Antioch and their son Alexios II with Agnes of France, ca. 1179

Manuel had two wives. His first marriage, in 1146, was to Bertha of Sulzbach, a sister-in-law of Conrad III of Germany. She died in 1160. They had two daughters:

- Maria Komnene (1152–1182), wife of Renier of Montferrat.
- Anna Komnene (1154–1158).

Manuel's second marriage was to Maria of Antioch (nicknamed Xene), a daughter of Raymond and Constance of Antioch, in 1161 or 1162. By this marriage, Manuel had one son:

- Alexios II Komnenos, who succeeded as emperor in 1180.

Manuel had several illegitimate children:

By Theodora Vatatzina:

- Alexios Komnenos (fl. 1160s–1191), was recognised as the emperor's son and received the sebastokrator title. He was briefly married to Eirene Komnene, illegitimate daughter of Andronikos I Komnenos. He was involved in a conspiracy in October 1183, whereafter he was blinded and imprisoned and Eirene became a nun.

By Maria Taronitissa, the wife of John Doukas Komnenos:

- Alexios Komnenos, a pinkernes ("cupbearer"), who fled Constantinople in 1184 and was a figurehead of the Norman invasion and the siege of Thessalonica in 1185.

By other lovers:

- A daughter whose name is unknown. She was born around 1150 and married Theodore Maurozomes before 1170. Her son was Manuel Maurozomes, whose daughter married Kaykhusraw I, the Seljuk Sultanate of Rûm, and her descendants ruled the sultanate from 1220 to 1246.
- A daughter whose name is unknown, born around 1155. She was the maternal grandmother of the author Demetrios Tornikes.

== Assessments ==
=== Foreign and military affairs ===
As a young man, Manuel had been determined to restore by force of arms the predominance of the Byzantine Empire in the Mediterranean countries. By the time he died in 1180, 37 years had passed since that momentous day in 1143 when, amid the wilds of Cilicia, his father had proclaimed him emperor. These years had seen Manuel involved in conflict with his neighbours on all sides. Manuel's father and grandfather before him had worked patiently to undo the damage done by the battle of Manzikert and its aftermath. Thanks to their efforts, the empire Manuel inherited was stronger and better organised than at any time for a century. While it is clear that Manuel used these assets to the full, it is not so clear how much he added to them, and there is room for doubt as to whether he used them to best effect.

The most singular feature in the character of Manuel is the contrast and vicissitude of labour and sloth, of hardiness and effeminacy. In war he seemed ignorant of peace, in peace he appeared incapable of war.

— Edward Gibbon

Manuel had proven himself to be an energetic emperor who saw possibilities everywhere, and whose optimistic outlook had shaped his approach to foreign policy. However, in spite of his military prowess Manuel achieved but a slight degree of his object of restoring the Byzantine Empire. Retrospectively, some commentators have criticised some of Manuel's aims as unrealistic, in particular citing the expeditions he sent to Egypt as proof of dreams of grandeur on an unattainable scale. His greatest military campaign, his grand expedition against the Turkish Sultanate of Iconium, ended in humiliating defeat, and his greatest diplomatic effort apparently collapsed, when Pope Alexander III became reconciled to the German emperor Frederick Barbarossa at the Peace of Venice. Historian Mark C. Bartusis argues that Manuel (and his father as well) tried to rebuild a national army, but his reforms were adequate for neither his ambitions nor his needs; the defeat at Myriokephalon underscored the fundamental weakness of his policies. According to Edward Gibbon, Manuel's victories were not productive of any permanent or useful conquest. His short-term alliances outside the Balkans were made possible through his "immense sum of money".

His advisors on western church affairs included the Pisan scholar Hugh Eteriano.

=== Internal affairs ===
Choniates criticised Manuel for raising citizen taxes and then excessively spending it. Whether one reads the Greek encomiastic sources, or the Latin and oriental sources, the impression is consistent with Choniates' picture of an emperor who spent lavishly in all available ways, rarely economising in one sector in order to develop another. Manuel spared no expense on the army, the navy, diplomacy, ceremonial, palace-building, the Komnenian family, and other seekers of patronage. A significant amount of this expenditure was pure financial loss to the Empire, like the subsidies poured into Italy and the crusader states, and the sums spent on the failed expeditions of 1155–1156, 1169 and 1176.

The problems this created were counterbalanced to some extent by his successes, particularly in the Balkans; Manuel extended the frontiers of his Empire in the Balkan region, ensuring security for the whole of Greece and Bulgaria. Had he been more successful in all his ventures, he would have controlled not only the most productive farmland around the Eastern Mediterranean and Adriatic seas, but also the entire trading facilities of the area. Even if he did not achieve his ambitious goals, his wars against Hungary brought him control of the Dalmatian coast, the rich agricultural region of Sirmium, and the Danube trade route from Hungary to the Black Sea. His Balkan expeditions are said to have taken great booty in slaves and livestock.

This allowed the Western provinces to flourish in an economic revival that had begun in the time of his grandfather Alexios I and continued till the close of the century. Indeed, it has been argued that Byzantium in the 12th century was richer and more prosperous than at any time since the Persian invasion during the reign of Heraclius, some five hundred years earlier. There is good evidence from this period of new construction and new churches, even in remote areas, strongly suggesting that wealth was widespread. Trade was also flourishing; it has been estimated that the population of Constantinople, the biggest commercial centre of the Empire, was between half a million and one million during Manuel's reign, making it by far the largest city in Europe. A major source of Manuel's wealth was the kommerkion, a customs duty levied at Constantinople on all imports and exports. The kommerkion was stated to have collected 20,000 hyperpyra each day.

Furthermore, Constantinople was undergoing expansion. The cosmopolitan character of the city was being reinforced by the arrival of Italian merchants and Crusaders en route to the Holy Land. The Venetians, the Genoese, and others opened up the ports of the Aegean to commerce, shipping goods from the Crusader kingdoms (Outremer) and Fatimid Egypt to the west and trading with Byzantium via Constantinople. These maritime traders stimulated demand in the towns and cities of Greece, Macedonia, and the Greek Islands, generating new sources of wealth in a predominantly agrarian economy. Thessalonica, the second city of the Empire, hosted a famous summer fair that attracted traders from across the Balkans and further to its bustling market. In Corinth, silk production fuelled a thriving economy. All this is a testament to the success of the Komnenian emperors in securing a Pax Byzantina in these heartland territories.

=== Religious affairs ===
There were three major theological controversies in the Byzantine empire in the second half of the 12th century, during Manuel's reign. The first regarded the question whether Christ had not only given, but received the sacrifice enacted in the Eucharist. A synod was held in January 1156, which concluded that all of the Holy Trinity received sacrifice, but the originator of the affair, Nikephoros Basilakes, found an ally in Patriarch of Antioch-elect Soterichos Panteugenos and continued the opposition to this. Panteugenos demanded to defend the view before Manuel, the Council of Blachernae in May 1157 again concluded the same outcome, and when Panteugenos stubbornly defended the oppositve view before Manuel, he was subsequently dismissed from office as demanded by the senior prelates present.

Ten years later, a controversy arose as to whether the saying of Christ, "My Father is greater than I", referred to his divine nature, to his human nature, or to the union of the two. Demetrius of Lampe, a Byzantine diplomat recently returned from the West, ridiculed the way the verse was interpreted there, that Christ was inferior to his father in his humanity but equal in his divinity. Manuel, on the other hand, perhaps with an eye on the project for Church union, found that the formula made sense, and prevailed over a majority in a synod convened on 2 March 1166 to decide the issue, where he had the support of the patriarch Luke Chrysoberges and later Patriarch Michael III. Those who refused to submit to the synod's decisions had their property confiscated or were exiled. According to Michael Angold, after the controversy of 1166 Manuel took his responsibilities very seriously, and tightened his grip over the church. 1166 was also the year in which Manuel first referred in his legislation to his role as the disciplinarian of the church (epistemonarkhes). The political dimensions of this controversy are apparent from the fact that a leading dissenter from the Emperor's doctrine was his nephew Alexios Kontostephanos.

A third controversy sprung up in 1180, when Manuel objected to the formula of solemn abjuration, which was exacted from Muslim converts. One of the more striking anathemas of this abjuration was that directed against the deity worshipped by Muhammad and his followers: "And before all, I anathematize the God of Muhammad about whom he [Muhammad] says, "He is God alone, God made of solid, hammer-beaten metal; He begets not and is not begotten, nor is there like unto Him any one." The emperor ordered the deletion of this anathema from the Church's catechetical texts, a measure that provoked vehement opposition from both the patriarch and bishops.

=== Legacy ===
Map of the Byzantine Empire under Manuel, c. 1180.

Manuel is representative of a new kind of Byzantine ruler who was influenced by his contact with western Crusaders. He arranged jousting matches, even participating in them, an unusual and discomforting sight for the Byzantines. Endowed with a fine physique, Manuel has been the subject of exaggeration in the Byzantine sources of his era, where he is presented as a man of great personal courage. According to the story of his exploits, which appear as a model or a copy of the romances of chivalry, such was his strength and exercise in arms that Raymond of Antioch was incapable of wielding his lance and buckler. In a famous tournament, he is said to have entered the lists on a fiery courser, and to have overturned two of the stoutest Italian knights. In one day, he is said to have slain forty Turks with his own hand, and in a battle against the Hungarians he allegedly snatched a banner, and was the first, almost alone, who passed a bridge that separated his army from the enemy. On another occasion, he is said to have cut his way through a squadron of five hundred Turks, without receiving a wound; he had previously posted an ambuscade in a wood and was accompanied only by his brother and Axouch.

To the rhetors of his court, Manuel was the "divine emperor". A generation after his death, Choniates referred to him as "the most blessed among emperors", and a century later John Stavrakios described him as "great in fine deeds". John Phokas, a soldier who fought in Manuel's army, characterised him some years later as the "world saving" and glorious emperor. Manuel would be remembered in France, Italy, and the Crusader states as the most powerful sovereign in the world. A Genoese analyst noted that with the passing of "Lord Manuel of divine memory, the most blessed emperor of Constantinople ... all Christendom incurred great ruin and detriment." William of Tyre called Manuel "a wise and discreet prince of great magnificence, worthy of praise in every respect", "a great-souled man of incomparable energy", whose "memory will ever be held in benediction." Manuel was further extolled by Robert of Clari as "a right worthy man, [...] and richest of all the Christians who ever were, and the most bountiful."

A telling reminder of the influence that Manuel held in the Crusader states in particular can still be seen in the church of the Holy Nativity in Bethlehem. In the 1160s the nave was redecorated with mosaics showing the councils of the church. Manuel was one of the patrons of the work. On the south wall, an inscription in Greek reads: "the present work was finished by Ephraim the monk, painter and mosaicist, in the reign of the great emperor Manuel Porphyrogennetos Komnenos and in the time of the great king of Jerusalem, Amalric." That Manuel's name was placed first was a symbolic, public recognition of Manuel's overlordship as leader of the Christian world. Manuel's role as protector of the Orthodox Christians and Christian holy places in general is also evident in his successful attempts to secure rights over the Holy Land. Manuel participated in the building and decorating of many of the basilicas and Greek monasteries in the Holy Land, including the church of the Holy Sepulchre in Jerusalem, where thanks to his efforts the Byzantine clergy were allowed to perform the Greek liturgy each day. All this reinforced his position as overlord of the Crusader states, with his hegemony over Antioch and Jerusalem secured by agreement with Raynald, Prince of Antioch, and Amalric, King of Jerusalem respectively. Manuel was also the last Byzantine emperor who, thanks to his military and diplomatic success in the Balkans, could call himself "ruler of Dalmatia, Bosnia, Croatia, Serbia, Bulgaria and Hungary".

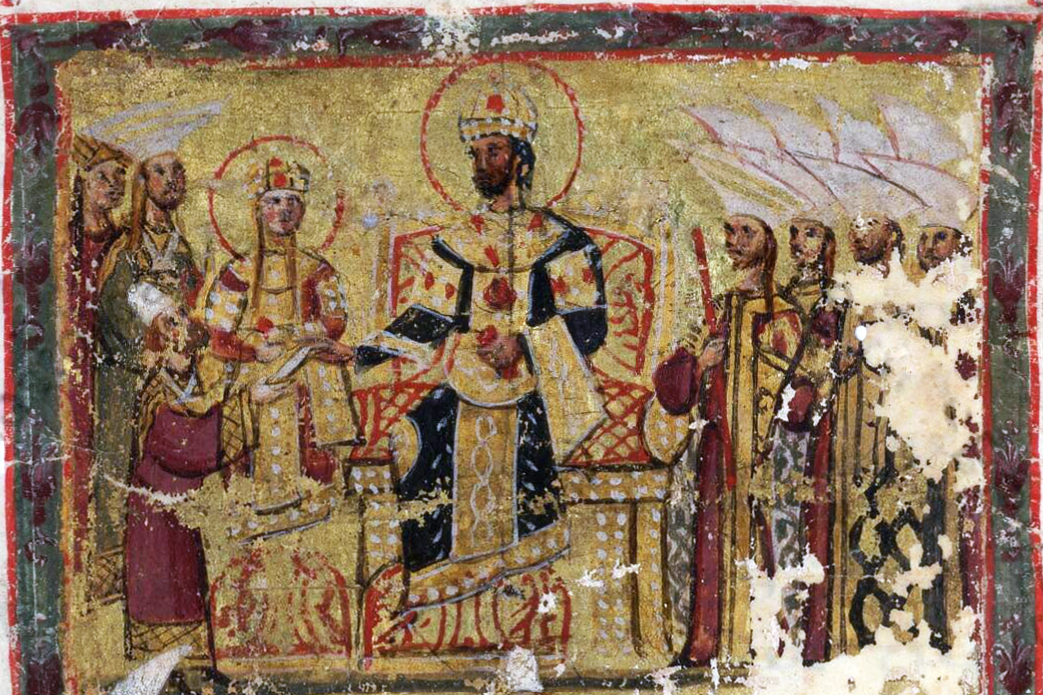
Manuel I Komnenos sitting next to his son Alexios II.

Manuel died on 24 September 1180, having just celebrated the betrothal of his son Alexios II to the daughter of the king of France. He was laid to rest alongside his father in the Pantokrator Monastery in Constantinople. Thanks to the diplomacy and campaigning of Alexios, John and Manuel, the empire was a great power, economically prosperous, and secure on its frontiers; but there were serious problems as well. Internally, the Byzantine court required a strong leader to hold it together, and after Manuel's death stability was seriously endangered from within. Some of the foreign enemies of the Empire were lurking on the flanks, waiting for a chance to attack, in particular the Turks in Anatolia, whom Manuel had ultimately failed to defeat, and the Normans in Sicily, who had already tried but failed to invade the Empire on several occasions. Even Venice, the single most important western ally of Byzantium, was on bad terms with the empire at Manuel's death. Given this situation, it would have taken a strong emperor to secure the Empire against the foreign threats it now faced, and to rebuild the depleted imperial treasury. But Manuel's son was a minor, and his unpopular regency government was overthrown in a violent coup d'état. This troubled succession weakened the dynastic continuity and solidarity on which the strength of the Byzantine state had come to rely.

== Genealogy ==
Manuel's paternal ancestors and collateral family (selective genealogy)

John Komnenos	Anna Dalassene
Alexios I Komnenos	Irene Doukaina
Anna Komnene	John II Komnenos	Irene of Hungary	Isaac Komnenos
Alexios Komnenos	Andronikos	Isaac Komnenos	Eudokia Komnene	Manuel I Komnenos	Andronikos I Komnenos
Maria Komnene m. Alexios Axouch	Theodora Komnene m. Baldwin III of Jerusalem	Theodora Komnene

== Notes ==
a: Magdalino underscores that, whereas John had removed the Rupenid princes from power in Cilicia twenty years earlier, Manuel allowed Toros to hold most of his strongholds he had taken, and effectively restored only the coastal area to imperial rule. From Raynald, Manuel secured recognition of imperial suzerainty over Antioch, with the promise to hand over the citadel, to instal a patriarch sent from Constantinople (not actually implemented until 1165–66), and to provide troops for the emperor's service, but nothing seems to have been said about the reversion of Antioch to direct imperial rule. According to Magdalino, this suggests that Manuel had dropped this demand on which both his grandfather and father insisted. For his part, historian Zachary Nugent Brooke believes that the victory of Christianity against Nur ad-Din was made impossible, since both Greeks and Latins were concerned primarily with their own interests. He characterises the policy of Manuel as "short-sighted", because "he lost a splendid opportunity of recovering the former possessions of the Empire, and by his departure threw away most of the actual fruits of his expedition". According to Piers Paul Read, Manuel's deal with Nur ad-Din was for the Latins another expression of Greeks' perfidy.

== Sources ==
=== Primary sources ===
- Choniates, Nicetas (1984). O City of Byzantium, Annals of Niketas Choniatēs. Translated by Harry J. Magoulias. Detroit: Wayne State University Press. ISBN 0-8143-1764-2.
- Kinnamos, John (1976). Deeds of John and Manuel Comnenus. Translated by Brand, Charles M. Columbia University Press – via Archive.org.
- Komnene, Anna (1969) [c. 1148]. The Alexiad of Anna Comnena. Translated by Sewter, E. R. A. Penguin Classics. ISBN 9780141904542.
- Robert of Clari (1939) [1208]. Stone, Edward N. (ed.). Robert of Clari's account of the Fourth Crusade (republication of Three Old French Chronicles of the Crusades, ed. Edward N. Stone ed.).
- William of Tyre (1943), Historia Rerum in Partibus Transmarinis Gestarum [A History of Deeds Done Beyond the Sea], translated by E. A. Babock and A. C. Krey, Columbia University Press, original text

=== Secondary sources ===
- Angold, Michael (1997). The Byzantine Empire, 1025–1204: A Political History (Second ed.). London and New York: Longman. ISBN 0-582-29468-1.
- Angold, Michael (1995). "Church and Politics under Manuel I Komnenos". Church and Society in Byzantium Under the Comneni, 1081–1261. Cambridge University Press. ISBN 0-521-26432-4.
- Birkenmeier, John W. (2002). "The Campaigns of Manuel I Komnenos". The Development of the Komnenian Army: 1081–1180. Brill. ISBN 90-04-11710-5.
- Buck, Andrew (2015). "Between Byzantium and Jerusalem? The principality of Antioch, Renaud of Châtillon, and the penance of Mamistra in 1158". Mediterranean Historical Review. 30 (2): 107–124. doi:10.1080/09518967.2015.1117203.
- Day, Gerald. W. (June 1977). "Manuel and the Genoese: A Reappraisal of Byzantine Commercial Policy in the Late Twelfth Century". The Journal of Economic History. 37 (2): 289–301. doi:10.1017/S0022050700096947. S2CID 155065665.
- Gibbon, Edward (1995). "XLVIII: The Decline and Fall". The History of the Decline and Fall of the Roman Empire (Volume III). Penguin Classics. ISBN 0-14-043395-3.
- Harris, Jonathan (2014). Byzantium and the Crusades (2nd ed.). Bloomsbury. ISBN 978-1-78093-767-0.
- Lau, Maximilian C. G. (2023). Emperor John II Komnenos: Rebuilding New Rome 1118-1143. Oxford: Oxford University Press. pp. 92–98, 127–34, 177–86, 248–55.
- Madden, Thomas F. (2005). "The Decline of the Latin Kingdom of Jerusalem and the Third Crusade". The New Concise History of the Crusades. Rowman & Littlefield. ISBN 0-7425-3822-2.
- Magdalino, Paul (2002) [1993]. The Empire of Manuel I Komnenos, 1143–1180. Cambridge: Cambridge University Press. ISBN 0-521-52653-1.
- McMahon, Lucas (2025). "Manuel I Komnenos' policy towards the Sultanate of Rum and John Kontostephanos' embassies to Jerusalem, 1159–61". Crusades. 24 (1): 47–66. doi:10.1080/14765276.2024.2405810.
- McMahon, Lucas (2026). "Avoiding Konya: How to go to the Holy Land in the Twelfth Century". Journal of Medieval History. 52 (1): 1–36. doi:10.1080/03044181.2025.2568481.
- Norwich, John J. (1995). Byzantium: The Decline and Fall. Alfred A. Knopf, Inc. ISBN 0-679-41650-1.
- Paparrigopoulos, Constantine; Karolidis, Pavlos (1925). History of the Hellenic Nation (in Greek). Vol. Db. Athens: Eleftheroudakis.
- Treadgold, Warren (1997). A History of the Byzantine State and Society. Stanford, California: Stanford University Press. ISBN 0-8047-2630-2.
- Sedlar, Jean W. (1994). "Foreign Affairs". East Central Europe in the Middle Ages, 1000–1500. University of Washington Press. ISBN 0-295-97290-4.
- Varzos, Konstantinos (1984). Η Γενεαλογία των Κομνηνών [The Genealogy of the Komnenoi] (PDF) (in Greek). Vol. A1. Thessaloniki: Centre for Byzantine Studies, University of Thessaloniki.
- Varzos, Konstantinos (1984). Η Γενεαλογία των Κομνηνών [The Genealogy of the Komnenoi] (PDF) (in Greek). Vol. B. Thessaloniki: Centre for Byzantine Studies, University of Thessaloniki.
- Vasiliev, Alexander Alexandrovich (1928–1935). "Byzantium and the Crusades". History of the Byzantine Empire. University of Wisconsin Press. ISBN 0-299-80925-0.

Manuel I Komnenos Komnenian dynasty Born: 28 November 1118 Died: 24 September 1180
Regnal titles
Preceded by John II Komnenos	Byzantine emperor 1143–1180	Succeeded by Alexios II Komnenos
