= Philip of France (1116–1131) =

King of the Franks from 1129 to 1131

Philip
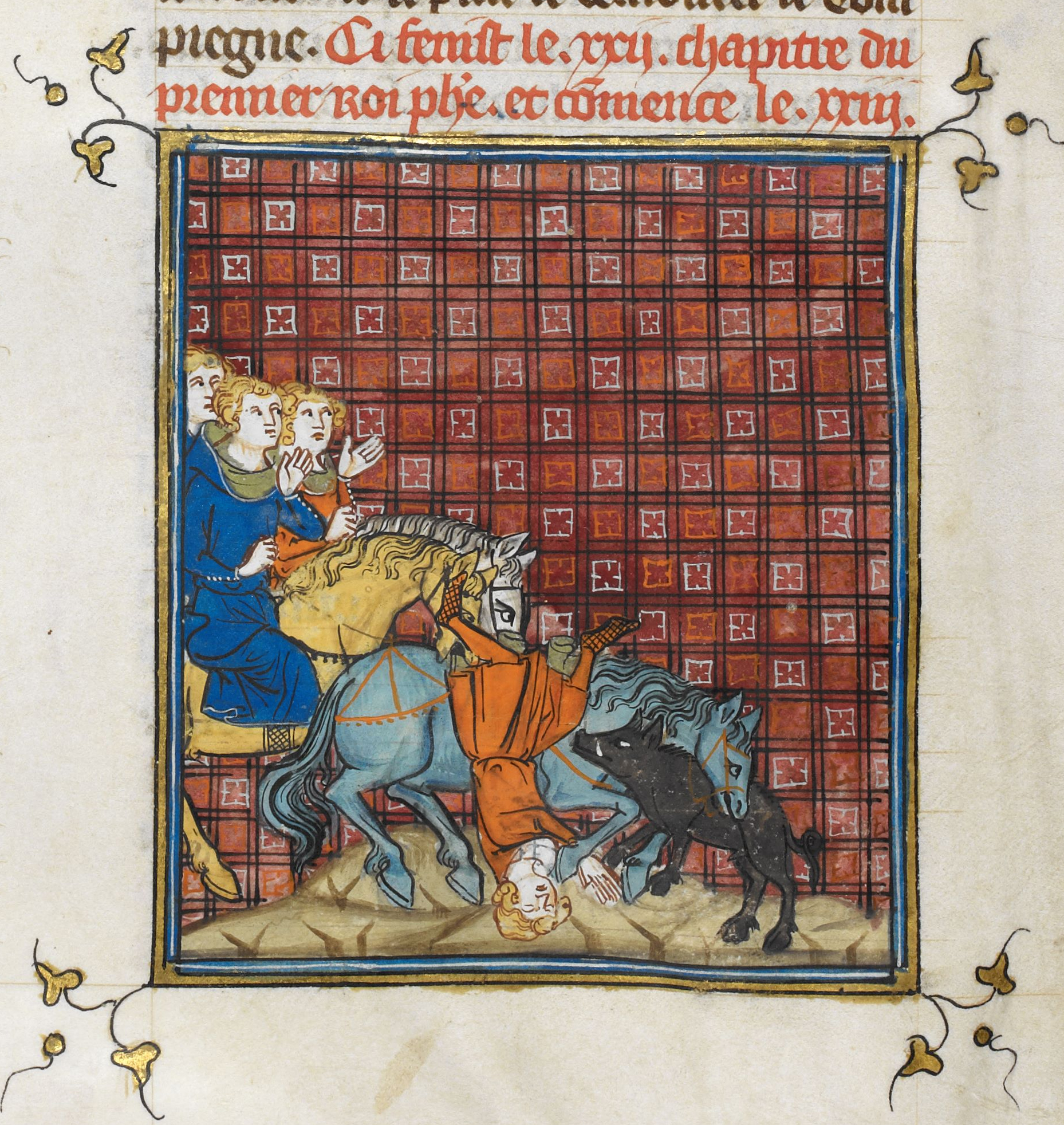
- Philip's accidental death aged 15, illustration from a copy of the Grandes Chroniques de France, c. 1332–1350

King of the Franks
- Co-reign: 14 April 1129 – 13 October 1131
- Coronation: 14 April 1129
- Born: 29 August 1116
- Died: 13 October 1131 (aged 15); Paris
- Burial: Basilica of Saint-Denis
- House: Capet
- Father: Louis VI of France
- Mother: Adélaide of Maurienne

Philip (29 August 1116 – 13 October 1131) was King of France from 1129 to 1131, co-ruling with his father, Louis VI. As he predeceased his father and never reigned as sole king, he is not known by an ordinal or included in the traditional lists of French monarchs.

== Coronation ==
Philip was the eldest son of King Louis VI of France and Adelaide of Maurienne. Following the custom of naming eldest sons after their paternal grandfathers, Philip was named after Louis VI's father, Philip I. He appears to have been the favourite son of his father as a child and, once again following established practice of his family, the Capetians, was enthroned alongside his father as co-king in 1129. The young king gave his father little joy after that, refusing to pay attention to the old king or to follow the high standards that Louis himself followed. He became disobedient, refusing to heed scoldings or warnings; Walter Map said that he "strayed from the paths of conduct traveled by his father and, by his overweening pride and tyrannical arrogance, made himself a burden to all."

== Death ==
Philip's brief period as co-king was ended two years after his coronation. Riding with a group of companions near the Seine - according to Map, along the strand named the Greve -, his running horse was tripped by a black pig which darted out of a dung heap on the quay. The horse fell forwards, and the young king was catapulted over its head. The fall "so dreadfully fractured his limbs that he died on the day following" without regaining consciousness. The royal family was completely devastated by Philip's tragic death, as the historian Suger wrote that "Even Homer himself would not have been able adequately to express the extent and depth of grief and sadness that swept over his father and mother and the magnates of the kingdom." Philip was buried at the Basilica of Saint-Denis. Abbot Suger, who was a close friend of Louis VI, advised the grief-stricken king to "crown his son Louis (the future Louis VII), a very fine child, have him anointed with the sacred oil, and make him king with him, in order to prevent any disturbance from his rivals."

== Legacy ==
If Philip had been little other than a problem to his family and kingdom whilst he had lived, his legacy proved greater trouble still. Whilst he had lived, he had nurtured a dream of visiting Jerusalem and the tomb of Jesus; when Philip died, his bereaved brother Louis vowed to go in his place. This vow would provide Louis VII with a reason to join the disastrous Second Crusade in 1147 and an excuse to abandon Antioch in favour of Jerusalem. The Crusade led to many deaths on both sides, and the abandonment of Antioch proved to be a strategic failure and a partial cause for the dissolution of Louis VII's marriage to his first wife, Eleanor of Aquitaine.

Because Philip was a co-king rather than a king in his own right, he is not generally given a number in the succession of kings of France.

== Sources ==
- Montaubin, Pascal (2016). "Innocent II and Capetian France". In Doran, John; Smith, Damian J. (eds.). Pope Innocent II (1130-43): The World vs the City. Routledge.

Philip of France (1116–1131) House of Capet Born: 29 August 1116 Died: 13 October 1131
Regnal titles
Preceded by Louis VI as sole king	King of the Franks; 1129 – 1131 with Louis VI	Succeeded by Louis VI as sole king
