= Éon de l'Étoile =

Breton religious leader

Éon de l'Étoile (died 1150), from the Latin Eudo de Stella, was a Breton religious leader and "messiah". He opposed the Roman Catholic Church to the point of pillaging abbeys and monasteries and accumulating a large treasure during a period of eight years (1140–48). He was considered little more than an "illiterate idiot" by the Church authorities.

== Life ==
Born near Loudéac to a noble family, Eudon, as he was originally called, was briefly an Augustinian friar taking up a hermit's life in the Brocéliande (Brécheliant). Around 1140, during the reign of Conan III of Brittany, Éon took up residence in the abandoned priory of Moinet, but he did not remain there long. According to his own story, one day while attending the mass, he heard the priest say Per eum qui venturus est judicare vivos et mortuos ("by him whose it is to judge the living and the dead") and interpreted this as applying to himself, hearing his name in the eum of the liturgy. He thereafter went by the name Éon. Considering himself a prophet and messiah, he soon gathered about himself a body of faithful who met at his priory.

He became renowned for his magic, the glow which supposedly surrounded him, his ability to be in many places at once, and the sumptuous feasts to which he treated his guests. He secured the loyalty of the poor by granting them great riches, stolen from castles and monasteries. As an article of faith, the established Church was worldly, its wealth, its sacraments, and its offices worthless and ineffectual. Éon's band of followers attacked the rich and redistributed their wealth amongst themselves, eventually dressing themselves in the highest finery and eating lavishly. Members were ranked as "angels", "apostles", etc. Their principal message was of the Parousia. Éon and his followers spread their message throughout northern Brittany and as far as Gascony.

Éon's epithet, de l’Étoile ("of the star"), derives from a comet which appeared in 1148. Generally considered bad omens in the Middle Ages, a comet often signified the downfall of an illustrious person. Under Pope Eugene III, the Council of Reims in 1148 condemned Éon's movement as heresy (hérésie éoniste). The prelates ordered him arrested and brought before an ecclesiastical tribunal, though the first men sent to arrest him were themselves converted by his extravagant lifestyle. When Éon was first brought before the council he carried with him a forked branch, which he said would point heavenward if God were to have two thirds of the world and he a third and earthwards if their shares were to be reversed. The council is said to have burst into laughter upon hearing this. He was tortured into confessing his messiahship and condemned to life imprisonment. He was handed over to the custody of Archbishop Samson of Reims and sent to the Abbey of Saint-Denis, where he died in 1150. His followers (with names like Wisdom, Knowledge, and Judgement) were hunted down, with difficulty, and burnt at the stake, for none would disavow their master.

== Sources ==
- Avril, Jean-Loup. Mille Bretons, dictionnaire biographique. Saint-Jacques-de-la-Lande: Les Portes du Large, 2002. ISBN 2-914612-10-9.
- Cohn, Norman. The Pursuit of the Millennium: Revolutionary Millenarism and Mystical Anarchists of the Middle Ages. Secker & Warburg 1957.
- Salmon-Legagneur, Emmanuel. Les noms qui ont fait l'Histoire de Bretagne. Coop Breizh/Institut Culturel de Bretagne, 1997. ISBN 2-84346-032-8.
- Zacour, Norman P. "The Children's Crusade." The Later Crusades, 1189–1311, ed. H. W. Hazard and R. L. Wolff, volume II of A History of the Crusades, series ed. K. M. Setton. Madison: University of Wisconsin Press, 1969.
