= Henry of France (archbishop of Reims) =

French archbishop of Reims from 1161 to 1175

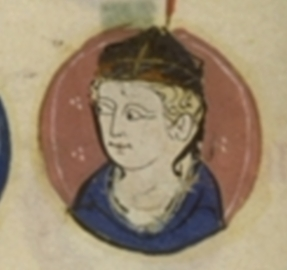
- Henry from a 14th-century miniature

Archbishop of Reims
- Reign: 1161–1175
- Predecessor: Samson of Mauvoisin
- Successor: William of the White Hands
- Born: circa 1121
- Died: 13 November 1175
- House: Capet
- Father: Louis VI of France
- Mother: Adelaide of Maurienne

Henry of France (circa 1121 – 13 November 1175), bishop of Beauvais (1149–1161), then archbishop of Reims (1161–1175), was the third son of King Louis VI of France and Adelaide of Maurienne.

As the third son of the king (and, on his mother's side, the great-nephew of Pope Calixtus II) Henry was destined for a place in the church from an early age, tonsured at the age of thirteen and ordained two years later. He advanced by stages through the church hierarchy (becoming abbot of several royal monasteries, holding various dignities which were in the King's gift), probably with a view to preparing him for a position of the highest rank, befitting the son of a king. In 1146, however, he was converted from his life as a very wealthy "secular" cleric by St. Bernard of Clairvaux and entered Clairvaux Abbey as an ordinary monk. Pope Eugenius III, himself a former Cistercian monk, speaks of Henry in 1147 as humbly washing dishes at Clairvaux. His position as abbot of the collegiate churches was bestowed upon his younger brother Philip.

In 1149, on the death of Bishop Odo III of Beauvais, the cathedral chapter, persuaded by Bernard of Clairvaux, elected Henry as their bishop. Henry was ill-prepared for the political responsibilities of his new office, and came into conflict with the burghers of the city. King Louis backed the town, while Henry was supported by his younger brother Robert, Count of Dreux. The conflict was finally settled by Pope Eugenius III in 1151.

In 1161 Henry became Archbishop of Reims, succeeded at Beauvais by Bartholomew of Montcornet. Henry organised an important church council at Reims in 1164. He again found himself in conflict with the populace of his city, but was supported by his brother Louis. The revolt was suppressed and Archbishop Henry devoted himself to beautifying and fortifying Reims, which included building the castles of Septsaulx and Cormicy.

== Notes ==
Catholic Church titles
Preceded by Samson de Mauvoisin	Archbishop of Reims; 1162–1175	Succeeded by William White Hands
