= Marie de Breuillet =

French royal mistress (1080–1119)

- Born: 1080 near Longpont, Aisne
- Died: 1119 (aged 38–39); Orléans, France
- Spouse: Thévin d'Orsay
- Partner: Louis VI of France
- Children: Isabelle de France (1105–1175); Aimon d'Orsay; Nantier d'Orsay
- Father: Renaud de Breuillet de Dourdan

Marie de Breuillet de Dourdan (Note: (French: [maʁi də bʁøjɛ də duʁdɑ̃])) (c. 1080 – c. 1119) was a French noblewoman and the royal mistress of Prince Louis of France (later King Louis VI of France) until 1104.

== Biography ==
=== Birth and background ===
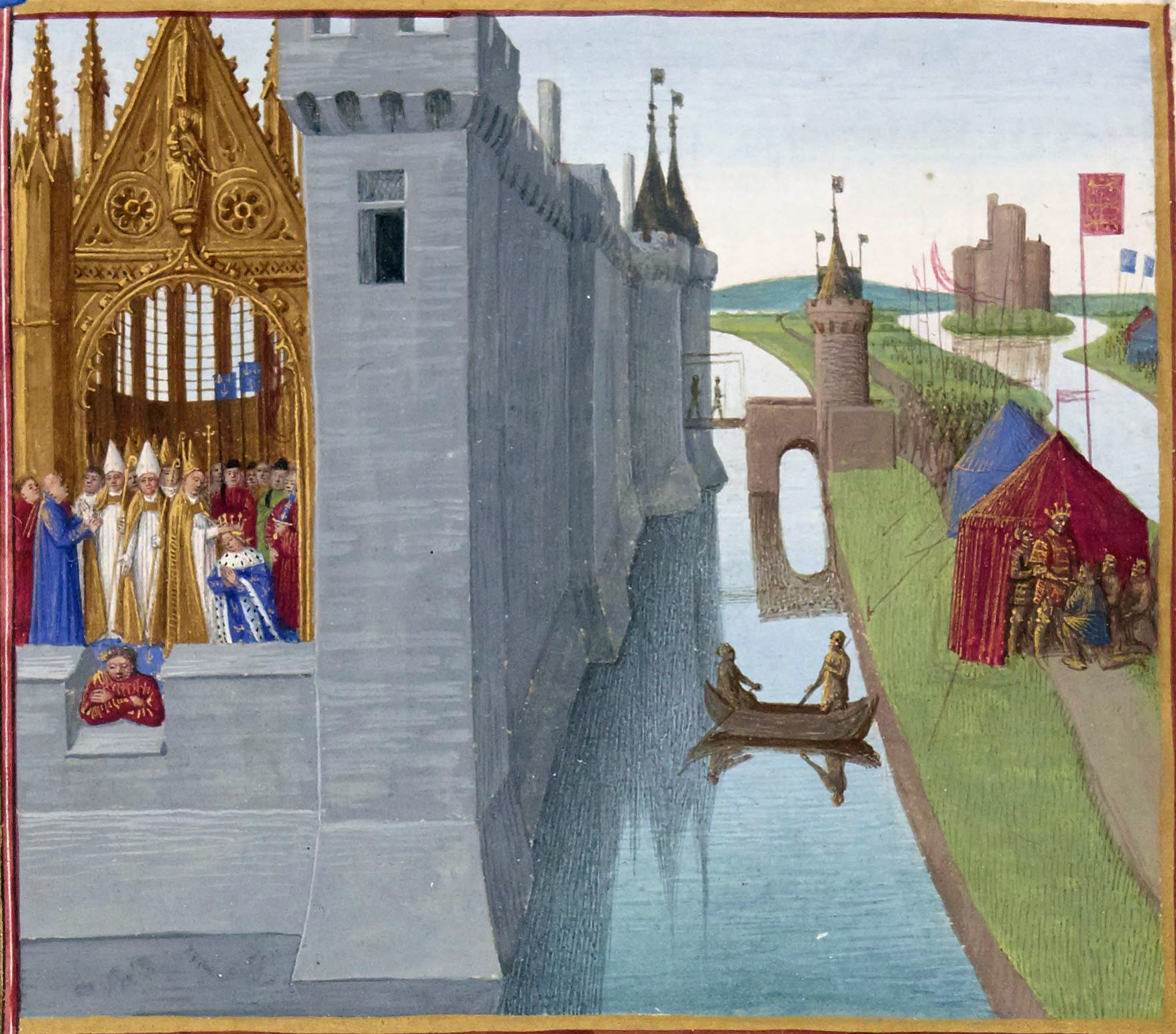
Coronation of Louis VI of France, called the Fat (French: le Gros).

Marie was born around 1080, perhaps near Longpont, she was the daughter of a knight, Renaud de Breuillet de Dourdan (died before 1115) and a woman named Florie. She had three brothers, two of whom, Renaud II de Brueillet and Godefroy de Breuillet became monks of the Longpont Abbey.

=== At court ===
Marie met Louis VI of France (Note: Marie was the mistress of Louis before his accession as King of the Franks on 29 July 1108.) during his stay in his castle located in Dourdan, cradle of the Capetians.

She became a mistress of Louis until 1104, when she left for a Parisian convent. In 1105, Marie gave birth to a daughter, Isabelle de France (1105–1175); married William of Vermandois, seigneur of Chaumont in 1117.

=== Marriage and children ===
Marie married Thévin d'Orsay, the son of Galeran Payen dit Châtel and Béatrix, they had two sons, Aimon and Nantier d'Orsay.

== Bibliography ==
- Dufour, Jean (1986). "Un Faux de Louis VI Relatif a Liancourt (Oise)" [A forgery of Louis VI relating to Liancourt (Oise)]. Bibliothèque de l'École des Chartes (in French). 144 (1): 39–67. doi:10.3406/bec.1986.450405.
- Pontoise (France). Saint-Martin (Benedictine abbey); Depoin, Joseph; Blottière, Jean Ernest (1904) [1895]. Cartulaire de l'abbaye de Saint-Martin de Pontoise [Cartulary of the Abbey of Saint-Martin de Pontoise] (in French). Vol. 4. Société historique du Vexin.
- Naus, James (2014). Bull, Marcus; Kempf, Damen (eds.). Writing the Early Crusades: Text, Transmission and Memory. Boydell & Brewer Ltd. ISBN 9781843839200.
- Adams, Tracy; Adams, Christine (16 March 2020). The Creation of the French Royal Mistress: From Agnès Sorel to Madame Du Barry. Penn State University Press. ISBN 9780271086446.
- Fawtier, Robert (1960). The Capetian Kings of France: Monarchy & Nation, 987-1328. Macmillan. ISBN 9780333087213.
