= Philip of France (archdeacon of Paris) =

Capetian prince and archdeacon of Paris (c.1132–1160)

- Born: c. 1132
- Died: 1160
- Burial: Basilica of St Denis
- House: Capet
- Father: Louis VI of France
- Mother: Adelaide of Maurienne

Philip of France (c. 1132 -1160) was a Capetian prince and archdeacon of Paris.

== Ecclesiastical career ==
Born c.1132, Philip was the youngest son of King Louis VI of France and his second wife, Adelaide de Maurienne. From birth he was destined for an ecclesiastical career. By 1147, Philip had succeeded his brother Henry as abbot of the collegiate churches of Notre-Dame of Étampes, Notre-Dame of Corbeil, Notre-Dame of Mantes, Notre-Dame of Poissy and Saint Melon of Pontoise. There are charters indicating Philip became abbot of these collegiate churches in 1138, but scholars are unsure of their authenticity. In the four extant charters concerning Philip, his status as a brother or son of the king was mentioned.

Philip held many ecclesiastical positions: treasurer of Saint Corneille of Compiegne, dean at Orleans and archdeacon by 1155, canon at Notre-Dame at Paris and dean of St Martin of Tours. He declined the election for Bishop of Paris, supporting the election of Peter of Lombardy instead.

=== Disputes ===
During the 1140s, Philip refused to pay homage to the bishop of Meaux, after the latter seized grain as rent for Saint Corneille of Compiegne.

In a display of royal hubris, Philip and an armed group of canons and laymen occupied Saint Corneille of Compiegne and seized the treasury, in 1149, to keep the monastery from being transferred to the Abbot of St Denis. This action was against the decision of his brother King Louis VII and Pope Eugene III. The situation was resolved when a group of townspeople forced Philip's canons from the monastery. Neither Philip nor his armed group were harmed, since the townspeople feared such action would be considered as an insult to the King. Despite this, years later Philip refused to relinquish the monastery's treasury to the new abbot, causing Pope Adrian IV to ask Henry of Beauvais to intervene.

In 1150, Philip complained to Eugene that canons from Orleans had seized a church within his deanery. Yet in contrast, in 1152, Louis VII had to intervene between Philip and the canons of Notre-Dame of Mantes. Philip believed that as abbot, he had the power to summon the canons to court at his whim. The canons believed they were only answerable to their own chapter. Supported by the Archbishop of Reims, Louis VII ruled in favour of the canons.

Pope Anastasius IV, in 1155, wrote to Louis VII asking that he and Philip not take insult to complaints from the canons of Orleans, which were delivered to him.

== Death ==
Philip died in 1160. The incorrect inscription on his tomb, in the Basilica of St Denis, states 1161.

== Sources ==
- Lewis, Andrew W. (1995). "The Career of Philip the Cleric, Younger Brother of Louis VII: Apropos of an Unpublished Charter". Traditio. 50. Cambridge University Press: 111–127. doi:10.1017/S0362152900013192. JSTOR 27831913. S2CID 161370401.
- Suger (Abbot of Saint Denis) (1992). The Deeds of Louis the Fat. Translated by Cusimano, Richard; Moorhead, John. The Catholic University of America Press.
