= Adelaide of Maurienne =

Queen of the Franks from 1115 to 1137

Queen consort of the Franks
- Tenure: 1115 – 1 August 1137
- Born: 1092; Saint-Jean-de-Maurienne, France
- Died: 18 November 1154 (aged 61–62); Montmartre Abbey, Paris, France
- Burial: Saint-Pierre de Montmartre
- Spouses: Louis VI of France (m. 1115; died 1137) Matthieu I of Montmorency (m. 1141)
- Issue: Philip of France; Louis VII of France; Henry, Archbishop of Reims; Robert I of Dreux; Constance, Countess of Toulouse; Philip, Archdeacon of Paris; Peter of Courtenay
- House: Savoy
- Father: Humbert II of Savoy
- Mother: Gisela of Burgundy

Adelaide de Maurienne, also called Adelaide de Savoye, Alix, or Adele (1092 – 18 November 1154), was Queen of France as the second wife of King Louis VI (1115–1137).

== Family ==
Adelaide was the daughter of Count Humbert II of Savoy and Gisela of Burgundy. Adelaide's older brother Amadeus III succeeded their father as count of Savoy in 1103. Adelaide had the same name as her paternal great-grandmother Adelaide of Susa, ruler of the March of Turin, and her second cousin, Adelaide del Vasto, queen of Jerusalem. Through her father, Adelaide was also related to Emperor Henry V. On her mother's side, Adelaide's relatives included her uncle Pope Callixtus II, who visited Adelaide at court in France, and her first cousin King Alfonso VII of León and Castile.

== Queen Consort ==
Adelaide became the second wife of King Louis VI of France, whom she married on 3 August 1115 in Paris, France. They had nine children, the second of whom became Louis VII of France.

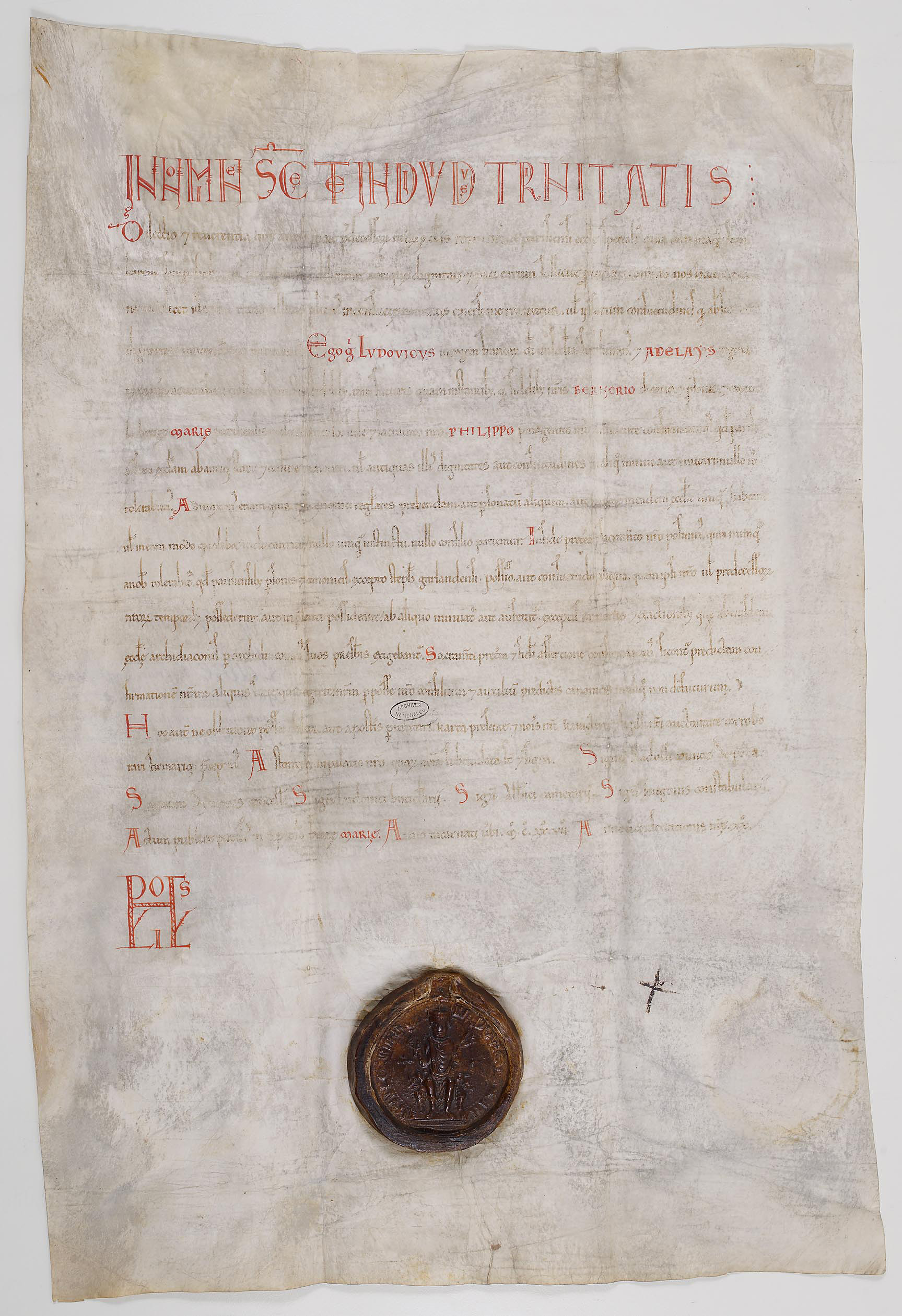
Diploma issued by King Louis VI and Queen Adelaide for the canons of the cathedral chapter of Paris (1127)

Adelaide was one of the most politically active of all France's medieval queens. Her name appears on 45 royal charters from the reign of Louis VI. During her tenure as queen, royal charters were dated with both her regnal year and that of the king. Among many other religious benefactions, at her instigation and request she and Louis VI founded the Abbey of Saint-Pierre de Montmartre, in the northern suburbs of Paris.

After Louis VI's death, Adelaide did not immediately retire to conventual life, as did most widowed queens of the time. Instead, she married Mathieu I de Montmorency. It is thought by some that she had one child with Mathieu, although there is insufficient documentation to know for certain. She remained active in the French court and religious activities.

== Death ==
In 1153 she retired to Montmartre Abbey, which she had founded with Louis VII. She died there on 18 November 1154. She was buried in the cemetery of the Church of St. Pierre at Montmartre. The abbey was destroyed during the French Revolution, but Adelaide's tomb is still visible in the church of St Pierre.

== Legend ==
Adelaide is one of two queens in a legend related in the seventeenth century by William Dugdale. As the story goes, Queen Adélaide of France became enamored of a young knight, William d'Albini, at a joust. However, he was already engaged to Adeliza of Louvain and refused to become her lover. The jealous Adélaide lured him into the clutches of a hungry lion, but William ripped out the beast's tongue with his bare hands and thus killed it. This story is almost without a doubt, apocryphal.

== Issue ==
Adelaide and Louis had:

1. Philip of France (1116–1131)
2. Louis VII (1120 – 18 November 1180), King of France
3. Henry (1121–1175), Archbishop of Reims
4. Hugues (b. c. 1122)
5. Robert (c. 1123 – 11 October 1188), Count of Dreux
6. Constance (c. 1124–16 August 1176), married first Eustace IV, Count of Boulogne and then Raymond V of Toulouse
7. Philip (1125–1161), Bishop of Paris.
8. Peter (c. 1126 – 1183), married Elizabeth, Lady of Courtenay
9. a daughter, whose name is not known, who died in infancy and was interred at the Abbey of Saint-Victor, Paris

Adelaide and Matthieu had:

- Adèle (or Aelis or Alix) of Montmorency

== Sources ==
- Dupuy, Micheline (1968). Francaises, reines d'Angleterre (in French). Perrin.
- Facinger, Marion F. (1968). "A Study of Medieval Queenship: Capetian France, 987–1237". Studies in Medieval and Renaissance History. 5: 3–48.
- Hanley, Catherine (2022). Two Houses, Two Kingdoms: A History of France and England, 1100-1300. Yale University Press.
- Henneman, John Bell Jr. (1995). "Adelaide of Savoy". In Kibler, William W.; Zinn, Grover A. (eds.). Medieval France: An Encyclopedia. Routledge.
- Huneycutt, Lois L. (2004). "The Creation of a Crone: The Historical Reputation of Adelaide of Maurienne". In Nolan, Kathleen (ed.). Capetian Women. Palgrave Macmillan. pp. 27–43.
- Montaubin, Pascal (2016). "Innocent II and Capetian France". In Doran, John; Smith, Damian J. (eds.). Pope Innocent II (1130-43): The World vs the City. Routledge.
- Nolan, Kathleen (2003). "The Tomb of Adelaide of Maurienne and the Visual Imagery of Capetian Queenship". In Nolan, Kathleen (ed.). Capetian Women. Palgrave Macmillan.
- Previte-Orton, C. W. (1912). The Early History of the House of Savoy. Cambridge University Press.
- Stroll, Mary (2004). Calixtus the Second, 1119-1124. Brill.

Adelaide of Maurienne House of Savoy Born: 1097 Died: 18 November 1154
French royalty
| Preceded by Bertrade de Montfort | Queen consort of France; 1115–1137 | Succeeded by Eleanor of Aquitaine |
