= Lycée Suger =

Coordinates: 48.9292°N 2.3663°E

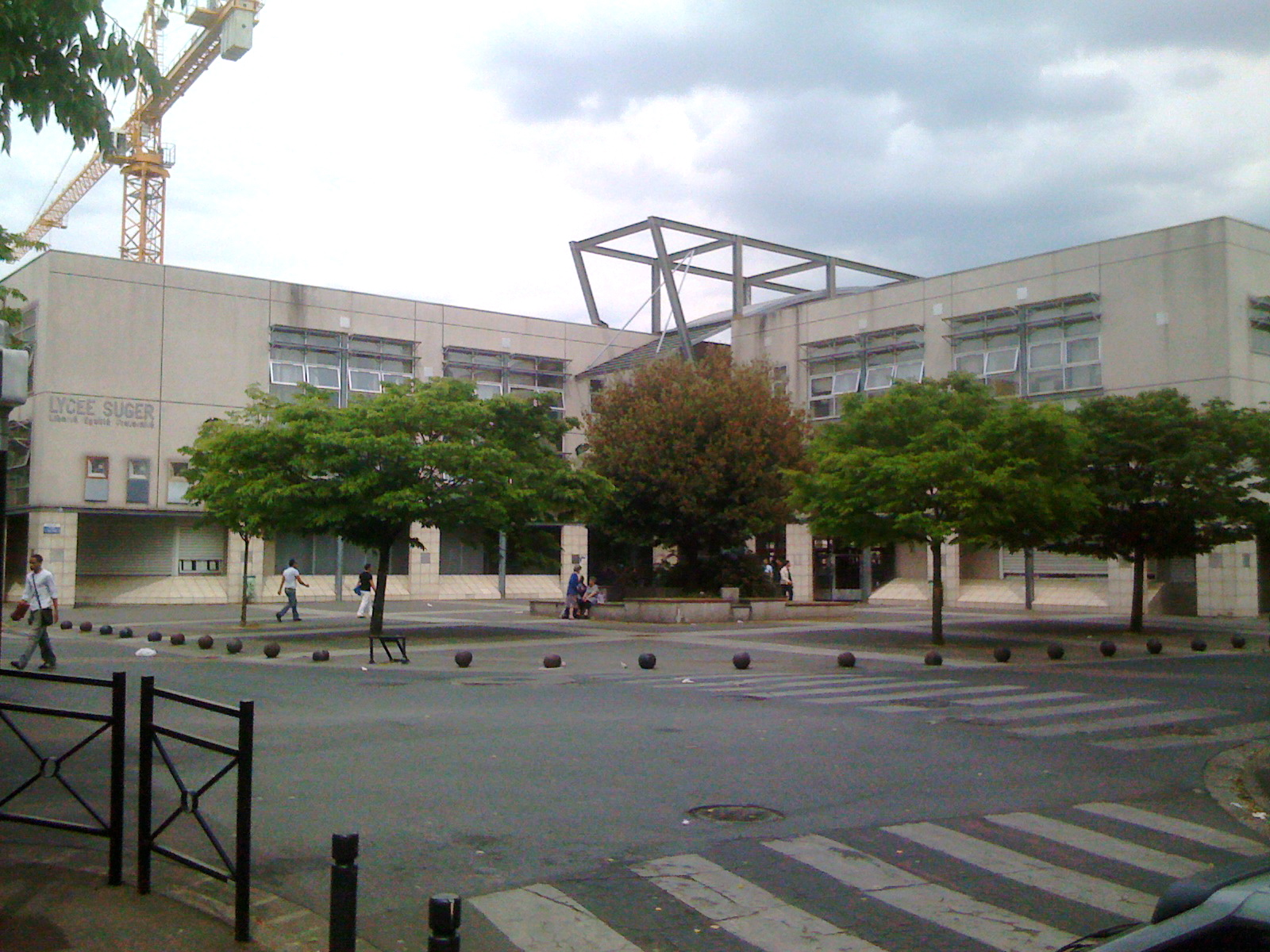

Information
- Type: Public high school

Lycée Suger is a senior high school/sixth-form college in the Le Franc-Moisin area of Saint-Denis, Seine-Saint-Denis, France, within the Paris metropolitan area. The school opened in 1994.

The teachers went on strike in September 2016.
