= Louis VI of France =

King of the Franks from 1108 to 1137

Louis VI
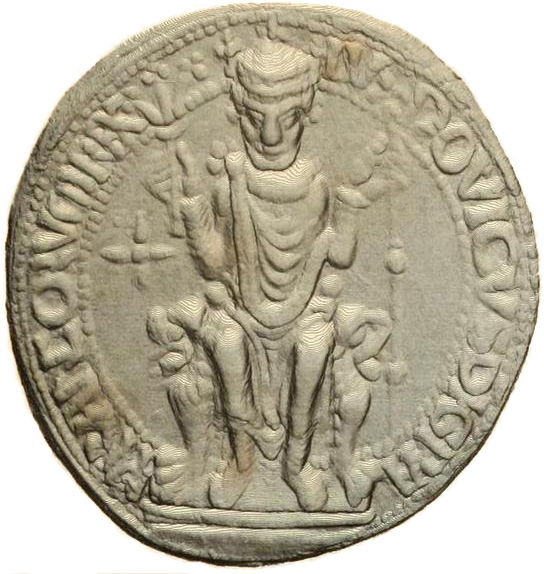
- Louis VI's seal

King of the Franks
- Reign: 29 July 1108 – 1 August 1137
- Coronation: 3 August 1108, Orléans
- Predecessor: Philip I
- Successor: Louis VII
- Co-king: Philip (1129–1131)
- Born: 1 December 1081; Paris, France
- Died: 1 August 1137 (aged 55); Béthisy-Saint-Pierre, France
- Burial: Saint Denis Basilica, Paris, France
- Spouses: Lucienne of Rochefort (m. 1104; ann. 1107) Adelaide of Maurienne (m. 1115)
- Issue: Philip of France; Louis VII of France; Henry, Archbishop of Reims; Robert I, Count of Dreux; Constance, Countess of Toulouse; Philip, Archdeacon of Paris; Peter I, Lord of Courtenay
- House: Capet
- Father: Philip I of France
- Mother: Bertha of Holland

Louis VI (1 December 1081 – 1 August 1137), called the Fat (French: le Gros) or the Fighter (French: le Batailleur), reigned as King of the Franks from 1108 to 1137. Like his father Philip I, Louis made a lasting contribution to centralizing the institutions of royal power. He spent much of his twenty-nine-year reign fighting – either against the "robber barons" who plagued the Île-de-France, or against Henry I of England for the English continental possessions in Normandy. Nonetheless, Louis VI managed to reinforce his influence considerably, often resorting to force to bring lawless knights to justice, and was the first member of the House of Capet to issue ordonnances applying to the whole of the kingdom of France.

Louis was a warrior-king, but by his forties his weight had become so great that it was increasingly difficult for him to lead in the field (hence the epithet "le Gros"). Details about his life and person are preserved in the Vita Ludovici Grossi Regis ("The Life of King Louis the Fat"), a panegyric composed by his loyal advisor, Suger, abbot of Saint Denis.

== Early life ==
Louis was born around 1081 in Paris, the son of Philip I of France and Bertha of Holland. (Note: "Probably in 1072, Philip married Bertha, daughter of the late count of Holland, Florent I, and stepdaughter of Robert of Frisia, count of Flanders. [...] For some years Philip and Bertha were troubled by their failure to have a son. The birth of the future Louis VI in 1081 was striking enough for a miracle story to grow up around the event [...].")

Abbot Suger of Saint Denis, who wrote a biography of Louis VI, tells us: "In his youth, growing courage matured his spirit with youthful vigour, making him bored with hunting and the boyish games with which others of his age used to enjoy themselves and forget the pursuit of arms." And "How valiant he was in youth, and with what energy he repelled the king of the English, William Rufus, when he attacked Louis' inherited kingdom."

In 1098, Louis was knighted by Guy I of Ponthieu. On Christmas Day 1100 he attended the royal court of Henry I of England in London, where according to Symeon of Durham, Louis appeared as "king elect of the Franks". By 1103 his father Philip I had already associated him with the government of the kingdom.

Louis married Lucienne de Rochefort, the daughter of his father's seneschal, in 1104, but repudiated her three years later. They had no children. On 3 August 1115 Louis married Adelaide of Maurienne, daughter of Humbert II of Savoy and of Gisela of Burgundy, and niece of Pope Callixtus II. They had eight children. Adelaide was one of the most politically active of all France's medieval queens. Her name appears on 45 royal charters from the reign of Louis VI. During her time as queen (1115–1137), royal charters were dated with both her regnal year and that of the king.

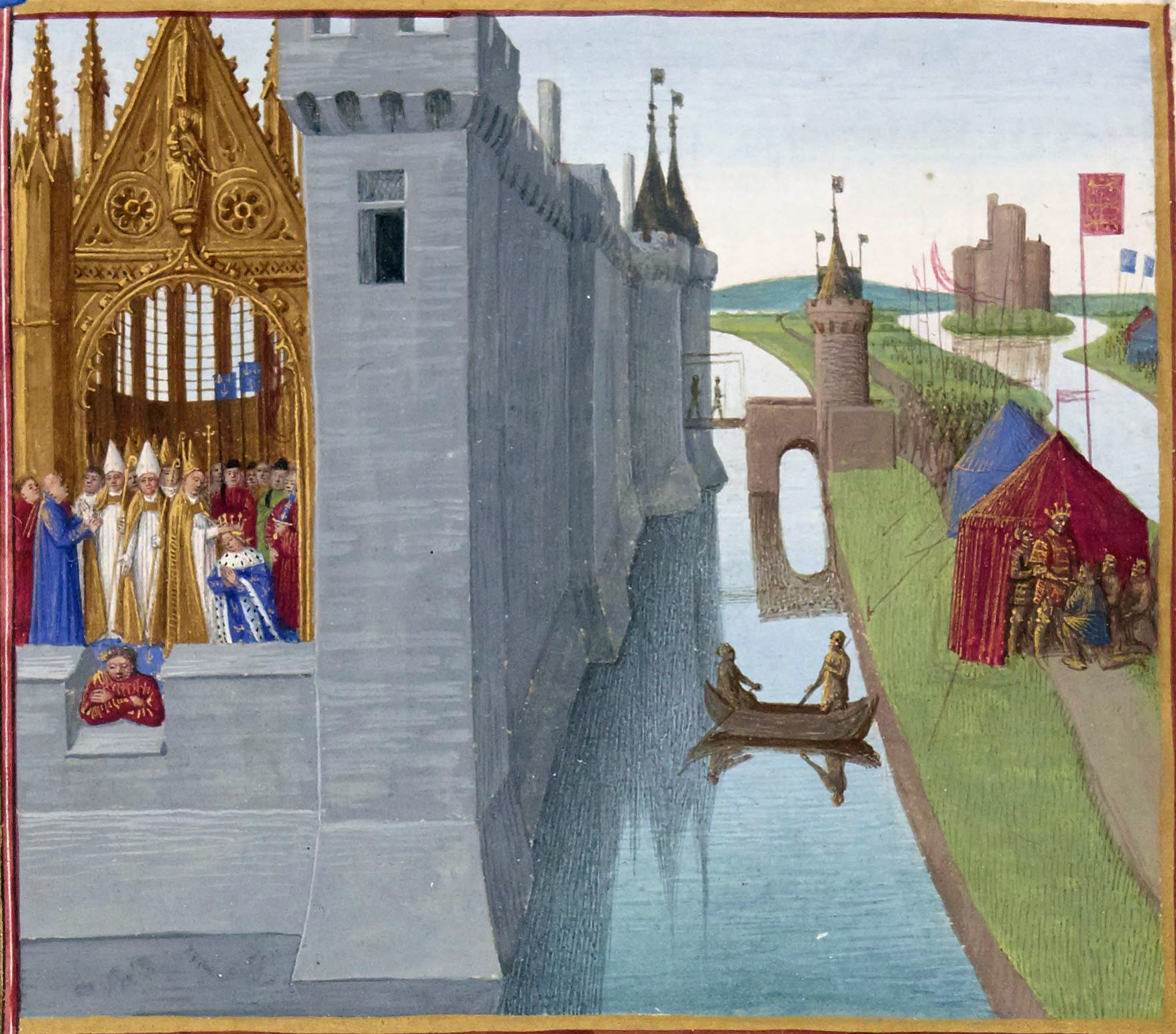
The crowning of Louis VI in Orléans.

Suger became Louis's adviser even before he succeeded his father as king at the age of 26 on 29 July 1108. Louis's half-brother prevented him from reaching Rheims, and so Daimbert, Archbishop of Sens, crowned him in the cathedral of Orléans on 3 August. Raoul le Vert (Ralph the Green), Archbishop of Rheims, sent envoys to challenge the validity of the coronation and anointing, but to no avail.

== Challenges to royal authority ==
When Louis ascended the throne, the Kingdom of France was a collection of feudal principalities. Beyond the Isle de France the French kings had limited authority over the great duke and counts of the realm but slowly Louis began to change this and assert Capetian power. This process would take two centuries to complete but began in the reign of Louis VI and his father Philip I.

The second great challenge facing Louis was to counter the rising power of the Anglo-Normans under their capable new king, Henry I of England.

== Struggles with the robber barons ==
From early in his reign (and previously during his father's reign) Louis faced the problem of the robber barons who resisted the King's authority and engaged in brigandry, making the area around Paris unsafe. From their castles, such as Le Puiset, Châteaufort, and Montlhéry, these robber barons would charge tolls, waylay merchants and pilgrims, terrorize the peasantry and loot churches and abbeys. The latter deeds drew the most ire of the writers of the day, who were mostly clerics.

In 1108, soon after he ascended the throne, Louis engaged in war with Hugh of Crécy, who was plaguing the countryside and had captured Eudes, Count of Corbeil, and imprisoned him at La Ferté-Alais. Louis besieged that fortress to free Eudes.

Also in 1108, a seigneur named Aymon Vaire-Vache seized the lordship of Bourbon from his nephew, Archambaud, a minor. Louis demanded the boy be restored to his rights but Aymon refused the summons. Louis raised his army and besieged Aymon at his castle at Germigny-l'Exempt, forcing its surrender.

In early 1109, Louis besieged his half-brother, Philip, the son of Bertrade de Montfort, who was involved in brigandry and conspiracies against the King, at Mantes-la-Jolie. Philip's plots included the lords of Montfort-l'Amaury. Amaury III de Montfort held many castles which, when linked together, formed a continuous barrier between Louis and vast swathes of his domains, threatening all communication south of Paris.

In 1121, Louis established the marchands de l'eau, to regulate trade along the Seine.

In 1122, Aimeri, Bishop of Clermont, appealed to Louis after William VI, Count of Auvergne, had driven him from his episcopal town. When William refused Louis' summons, Louis raised an army at Bourges, and marched into Auvergne, supported by some of his leading vassals, such as the Counts of Anjou, Brittany, and Nevers. Louis seized the fortress of Pont-du-Chateau on the Allier, then attacked Clermont, which William was forced to abandon. Aimeri was restored. Four years later William rebelled again and Louis, though his increasing weight made campaigning difficult, marched again. He burned Montferrand and seized Clermont a second time, captured William, and brought him before the court at Orléans to answer for his crimes.

Some of the outlaws became notorious for their cruelty, the most notable being Thomas, Lord of Coucy, who was reputed to indulge in torture of his victims, including hanging men by their testicles, cutting out eyes, and chopping off feet. Guibert of Nogent noted of him, "No one can imagine the number of those who perished in his dungeons, from starvation, from torture, from filth."

Another notable brigand was Hugh, Lord of Le Puiset, who was ravaging the lands around Chartres. In March 1111, Louis heard charges against Hugh at his court at Melun from Theobald II, Count of Champagne, the Archbishop of Sens, and also from bishops and abbots. Louis commanded Hugh to appear before him to answer these charges, but Hugh evaded the summons. Louis stripped him of his lands and titles and laid siege to Le Puiset. After a fierce struggle, Louis took the castle and burned it to the ground, taking Hugh prisoner.

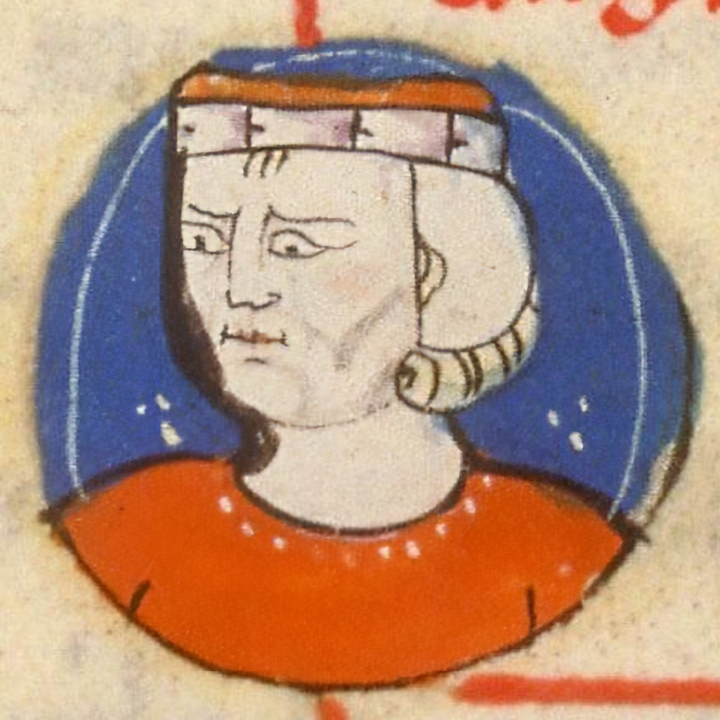
Theobald II of Champagne

Rashly, Louis released Hugh, and while Louis was engaged in war with Henry I of England and Theobald, Hugh raised another band of brigands and began ravaging the country again. When Louis returned his attention to Hugh, he found Le Puiset rebuilt and Hugh receiving aid from Theobald. Hugh held out against the King until Theobald abandoned him. Once again Louis razed Le Puiset and Hugh, who had sworn never to return to his brigandage, rebuilt the castle and resumed terrorizing his neighbours. At the third attempt, Louis finally defeated Hugh and stripped him of his possessions for the last time. Hugh later died on an expiatory pilgrimage to the Holy Land.

These were just some of the recalcitrant nobles Louis contended with. There were many more, and Louis was in constant motion against them, leading his army from castle to castle, bringing law and order to his domains. The result was increased recognition of the King's authority and the Crown's ability to impose its will, so that all sectors of French society began to see the King as their protector.

== War with Henry I over Gisors ==
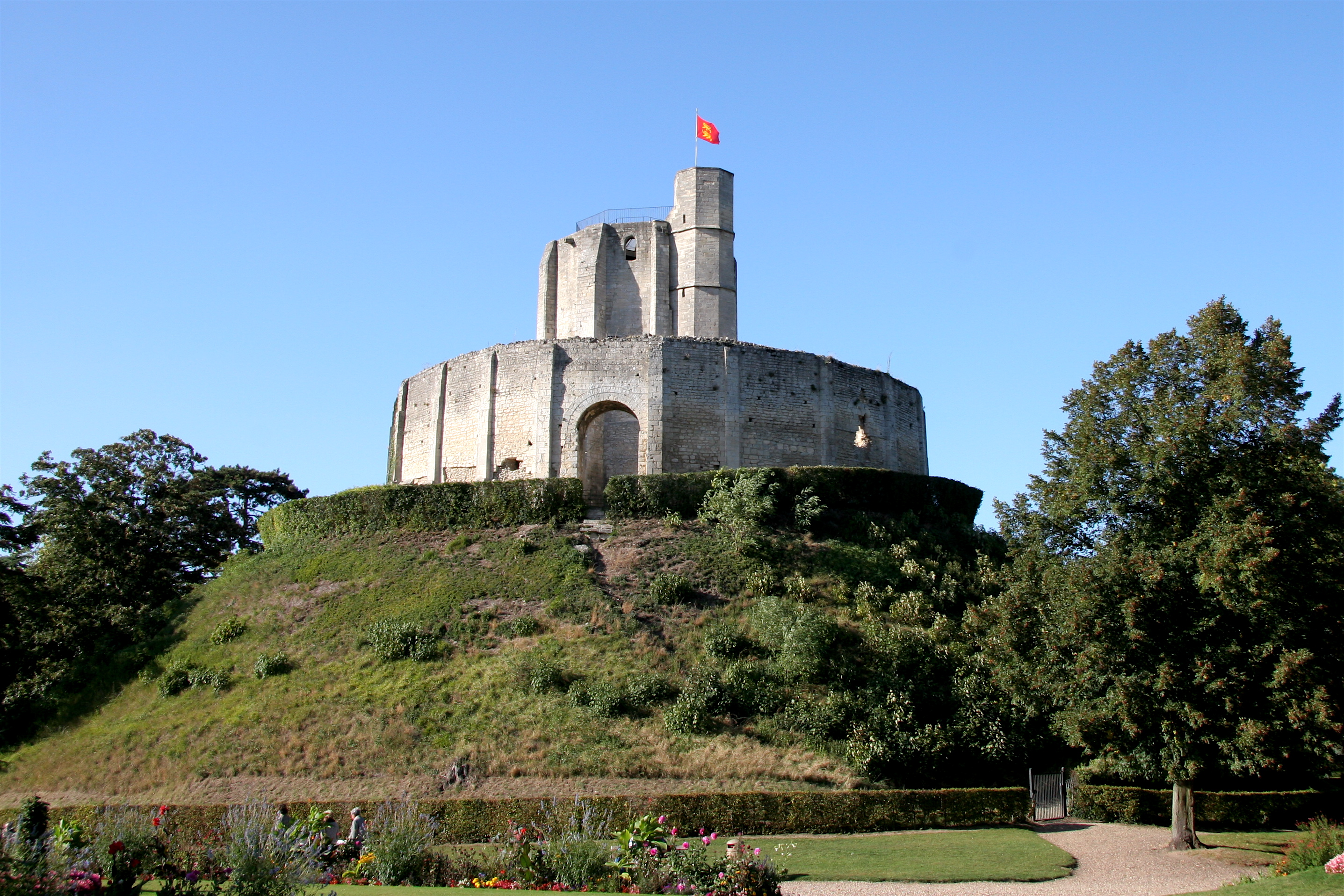
Motte and castle at Gisors.

After seizing the English Crown, Henry I of England deprived his brother, Robert Curthose, of the Duchy of Normandy and quickly took possession of the castle at Gisors, a fortress of strategic importance on the right bank of the Epte, commanding the road between Rouen and Paris. This violated an earlier agreement between Henry and the French King that Gisors should remain in the hands of a neutral castellan, or else be demolished.

This move threatened the Capetian domain and Louis was outraged, demanding Henry, as his vassal, appear before him to account for his actions. The two kings met, in force, in March 1109 at the borders of their respective territories at the bridge of Neauphle on the Epte. Henry refused to relinquish Gisors. Louis challenged the English King to single combat to settle the issue. When Henry refused, war was inevitable, a war which would last, on and off, for twenty years.

The first years of the war went well for Louis until the influential Theobald II, Count of Champagne, switched to Henry's side. By early 1112 Theobald had succeeded in bringing together a coalition of barons with grievances against Louis: Lancelin of Bulles, Ralph of Beaugency, Milo of Bray-sur-Seine, Hugh of Crecy, Guy of Rochfort, Hugh of Le Puiset and Hugh, Count of Troyes.

In response Louis formed an alliance with Fulk V of Anjou and several Norman lords, including Amaury III de Montfort, Guillaume Crinspin and Robert of Bellême. Louis defeated Theobald's coalition but the additional effort meant he could not defeat the English monarch as well or force him to abandon Gisors, and in March 1113 Louis was forced to sign a treaty recognizing Henry I as suzerain of Brittany and Maine. Peace of sorts lasted three years until April 1116 when hostilities renewed in the French and Norman Vexins, with each king making gains from his rival.

By 1119, buoyed by several successes and the capture (through treachery) of Les Andelys, Louis felt ready for a final encounter to end the war. In the fierce Battle of Bremule, in August 1119, Louis's troops broke and were routed, abandoning the royal banner and sweeping the King along with them in retreat to Les Andelys. A counterattack through Évreux to seize Breteuil failed, and Louis, his health failing, looked for peace.

He appealed to Pope Calixtus II, who agreed to help and met with Henry at Gisors in November 1120. The terms of the peace included Henry's heir, William Adelin, doing homage to Louis for Normandy, a return of all territories captured by both kings with the painful exception of Gisors itself, which Louis was forced to concede to Henry.

== Intervention in Flanders ==
On 2 March 1127, the count of Flanders, Charles the Good, was assassinated in St. Donatian's Cathedral at Bruges. It was a scandal in itself but made worse because it precipitated a succession crisis. Soon a number of relatives raised claims, including William of Ypres, popularly thought to be complicit in the murder; Thierry of Alsace; and Arnold of Denmark, nephew of Charles who seized Saint-Omer; Baldwin, Count of Hainault, who seized Oudenarde, and Godfrey I, Count of Louvain and Duke of Brabant.

Louis then moved decisively to secure Flanders, apprehending the murderers of Charles the Good and ousting the rival claimants. On 2 April he took Ghent, on 5 April Bruges, on 26 April he took Ypres, capturing William of Ypres and imprisoning him at Lille. He then quickly took Aire, Cassel and all the towns still loyal to William of Ypres. Louis's final act before leaving for France was to witness the execution of Charles the Good's murderers. They were hurled from the roof of the church of Saint Donatian where they had committed their crime.

Louis had his own candidate in mind and marched into Flanders with an army and urged the barons to elect William Clito, son of Robert Curthose, who had been disinherited of Normandy by his uncle Henry I of England, as their new Count. He had no better claim to Flanders than being the King's candidate but on 23 March 1127 he was elected Count by the Flemings. It was a triumph for Louis and demonstrated how far the Crown had come under his leadership, but it was a brief triumph. The new young Count fared badly, opposition was growing in the towns as a result of Clito's increasingly incompetent treatment of Flemish burghers. William's knights ran amok and the Flemings rebelled against Louis's candidate. Ghent and Bruge appealed to Thierry, Count of Flanders to Arnold of Denmark. Louis attempted to intervene again but the moment was gone. The people of Bruge rejected him and recognized Thierry of Alsace as their Count, and he quickly moved to enforce his claim. Louis called a great assembly at Arras, whereby the archbishop of Reims excommunicated Thierry and laid an interdict over the city of Lille. Louis abandoned William of Clito, who died during a siege at Alost on 27 July 1128, and after the whole country finally submitted to Thierry, Louis was obliged to confirm his claim.

== Invasion of Henry V ==
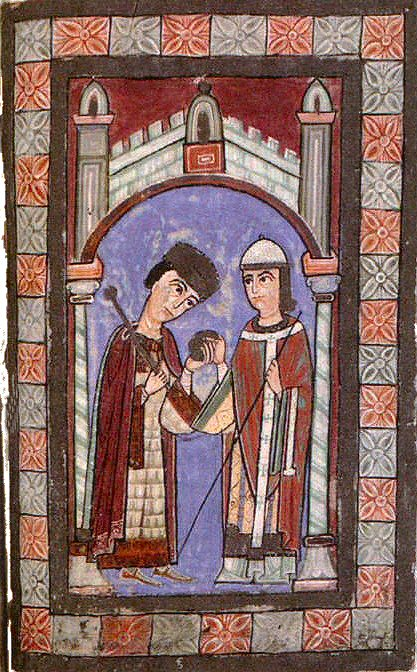
Henry V, Holy Roman Emperor, with Ruthard, Archbishop of Mainz. Paint on vellum. Parker Library, Corpus Christi College, Cambridge.

On 25 November 1120, Louis' fortunes against Henry I of England were raised when Henry's heir, William Ætheling, drunkenly perished aboard the White Ship en route from Normandy to England, putting the future of Henry's dynasty and his position in doubt.

By 1123 Louis was involved with a coalition of Norman and French seigneurs opposed to Henry. The plan was to drive the English King from Normandy and replace him with William Clito. Henry, however, easily defeated this coalition then instigated his son-in-law, Henry V, Holy Roman Emperor, to invade France.

Henry V had married the Empress Matilda, the English King's daughter and the future mother of Henry II of England, 9 years earlier, in hopes of creating an Anglo-German empire, though the couple remained childless. Like Louis, Henry V had designs on the Low Countries and an invasion of Northern France would enable him to strengthen his ambitions in Flanders, as well as support his father-in-law.

Thus in 1124, Henry V assembled an army to march on Rheims. It never arrived. In testament to how far Louis had risen as national protector, all of France rose to his appeal against the threat. Henry V was unwilling to see the French barons united behind their King, who now identified himself as the vassal of St. Denis, the patron saint of Paris, whose banner he now carried and the proposed invasion was abandoned.

Henry V died a year after the aborted campaign.

== Alliance of the Anglo-Normans and Anjou ==
In 1128 Henry I married his sole surviving legitimate child, the dowager Empress Matilda, to Geoffrey Plantagenet, Count of Anjou. This would prove to be a dangerous alliance for the French monarchy during the reign of his successor, Louis VII of France.

The marriage made Geoffrey the ancestor of the Plantagenet kings of England, and after Henry I’s death in 1135 he claimed the duchy of Normandy, which he conquered in 1144.

== Final years ==
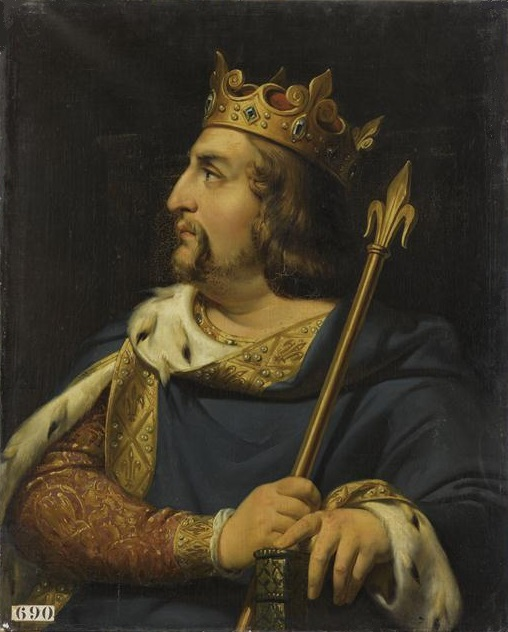
Posthumous painting by Merry-Joseph Blondel, 1837

As Louis VI approached his end, there seemed to be reasons for optimism. Henry I of England had died on 1 December 1135 and Stephen of Blois had seized the English crown, reneging on the oath he had sworn to Henry I to support Matilda. Stephen was thus in no position to bring the combined Anglo-Norman might against the French crown.

Louis had also made great strides in exercising his royal authority over his barons, and even Theobald II had finally rallied to the Capetian cause.

Finally, on 9 April 1137, a dying William X, Duke of Aquitaine appointed Louis VI guardian of his daughter and heiress, Eleanor of Aquitaine. Eleanor was suddenly the most eligible heiress in Europe, and Louis wasted no time in marrying her to his own heir, the future Louis VII, at the Cathedral of Saint-André in Bordeaux on 25 July 1137. At a stroke Louis had added one of the most powerful duchies in France to the Capetian domains.

Louis died of dysentery 7 days later, on 1 August 1137. Despite his achievements, it would be the growing power of the soon to be Angevin Empire that would come to overshadow his successor, its seeds sown in the marriage between the Empress Matilda and Geoffrey Plantagenet and realised through their son, Henry II of England. Philip II of France, his grandson, would eventually bring the Angevin Empire to an end and seize the Duchy of Normandy from John, King of England

Louis VI was interred in the Basilica of St Denis in Paris.

== Marriages and children ==
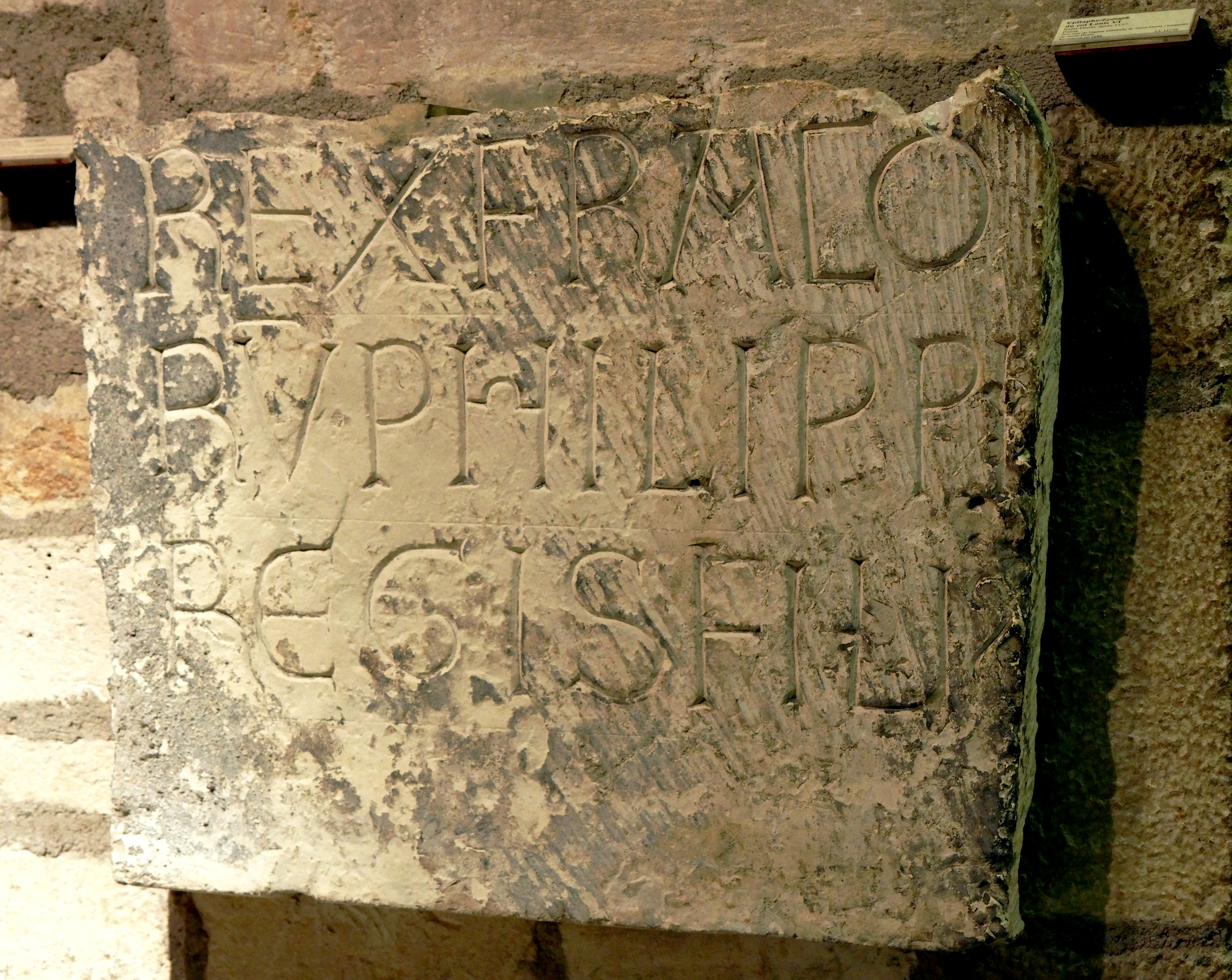
Ledger stone of Louis VI from the Basilica of St Denis, now at Cluny Museum

He married in 1104: 1) Lucienne de Rochefort — the marriage was annulled on 23 May 1107 at the Council of Troyes by Pope Paschal II.

Louis married in 1115: 2) Adélaide de Maurienne (1092–1154)

- Their children:
  1. Philip (29 August 1116 – 13 October 1131), King of the Franks (1129–31); died due to falling from a horse; not to be confused with his younger brother of the same name.
  2. Louis VII (1120 – 18 September 1180), King of the Franks
  3. Henry (1121 – 13 November 1175), Archbishop of Reims
  4. Hugh (ca 1122 – died young).
  5. Robert (ca 1123 – 11 October 1188), count of Dreux
  6. Peter (September 1126 – 10 April 1183), married Elizabeth, Lady of Courtenay
  7. Constance (ca 1128 – 16 August 1176), married first Eustace IV, count of Boulogne, elder son of King Stephan of England, and then Raymond V of Toulouse
  8. Philip (c.1132 -1160), Archdeacon of Paris

With Marie de Breuillet, daughter of Renaud de Breuillet de Dourdan, Louis VI was the father of a daughter:

- Isabelle (ca 1105 – before 1175), (Note: Jean Dufour theorizes that Marie de Breuillet may have been the mother of Isabelle.) (Note: Sara McDougall states Louis took a mistress, likely the daughter of a lesser noble from the de Breuillet family, and they had a daughter named Isabelle.) married (ca. 1119) William of Chaumont in 1117

== Sources ==
- Bouchard, Constance Brittain (2004), "The Kingdom of the Frank to 1108", in David Luscombe; Jonathan Riley-Smith (eds.), The New Cambridge Medieval History, vol. 4, Cambridge University Press, ISBN 9781139054034
- Bradbury, Jim (2007). The Capetians: Kings of France, 987-1328. Hambledon Continuum. ISBN 9781852855284.
- Cantor, Norman F. (1993), The Civilization of the Middle Ages, Harper Collins, ISBN 978-0060925536
- Devailly, Guy (1973), Le Berry du Xe siècle au milieu du XIIIe, Mouton, p. 399, ISBN 9783111631066
- Diffie, Bailey W. (2000) [1960], Prelude to Empire: Portugal Overseas before Henry the Navigator (Reissue ed.), The University of Nebraska Press, ISBN 9780803250499, OCLC 1183835482
- Dufour, Jean (January–June 1986), "Un Faux de Louis VI Relatif a Liancourt (Oise)", Bibliothèque de l'École des Chartes (in French), 144 (1): 39–67, doi:10.3406/bec.1986.450405.
- Fawtier, Robert (1989), The Capetian Kings of France, translated by Lionel Butler; R.J. Adam, Macmillan, ISBN 9780333087213
- Gilbert of Mons (2005), Chronicle of Hainaut, translated by Laura Napran, The Boydell Press, ISBN 9781843831204
- Halphen, Louis (1926), "France: Louis VI and Louis VII (1108–1180)", in J.R. Tanner; C.W. Previté-Orton; Z.N. Brooke (eds.), The Cambridge Medieval History: Contest of Empire and Papacy, vol. V, Macmillan, pp. 592–623
- Hollister, C. Warren (2003), Henry I, Yale University Press
- Legeard, Emmanuel (September 2021), "Le Siège de Germigny en Bourbonnais", Bulletin de la Société d'Emulation du Bourbonnais (in French), 80 (3): 388–404, doi:10.5281/zenodo.5482303
- Lewis, Andrew W. (1985), "Fourteen Charters of Robert I of Dreux (1152–1188)", Traditio, 41: 145–179, doi:10.1017/S0362152900006887, S2CID 152130766
- Lewis, Andrew W. (1995), "The Career of Philip the Cleric, younger Brother of Louis VII: Apropos of an Unpublished Charter", Traditio, 50, Cambridge University Press: 111–127, doi:10.1017/S0362152900013192, S2CID 161370401
- Luchaire, Achille (1890), Louis VI le Gros: annales de sa vie et de son règne (1081-1137) (in French), Paris: Libraire des Archives Nationales et de la Société de l'École des Chartes
- McDougall, Sara (2017), Royal Bastards: The Birth of Illegitimacy, 800-1230, Oxford University Press
- Naus, James (2014), "The Historia Iherosolimitana of Robert the Monk and the Coronation of Louis VI", in Marcus Bull; Damien Kempf (eds.), Writing the Early Crusades: Text, Transmission and Memory, Boydell Press, pp. 105–115, ISBN 9781843839200
- Rasmussen, Ann Marie (1997), Mothers and Daughters in Medieval German Literature, Syracuse University Press, ISBN 0815603894
- Suger (1999), The Deeds of Louis the Fat, translated by Jean Dunbabin
- Vincent, Nicholas (1999), "Isabella of Angouleme: John's Jezebel", in S. D. Church (ed.), King John: New Interpretations, The Boydell Press, ISBN 9780851157368
- van Caenegem, Raoul (1988), "Government, law and society", in J. H. Burns (ed.), The Cambridge History of Medieval Political Thought C.350-c.1450, Cambridge University Press, pp. 174–210, doi:10.1017/CHOL9780521243247.011, ISBN 9781139055390

Louis VI of France House of Capet Born: 1 December 1081 Died: 1 August 1137
Regnal titles
Preceded by Philip I	King of the Franks; 1108–1137 with Philip as junior king (1129–1131); Louis VII as junior king (1131–1137)	Succeeded by Louis VII
