= Suger =

12th-century French abbot, statesman and historian

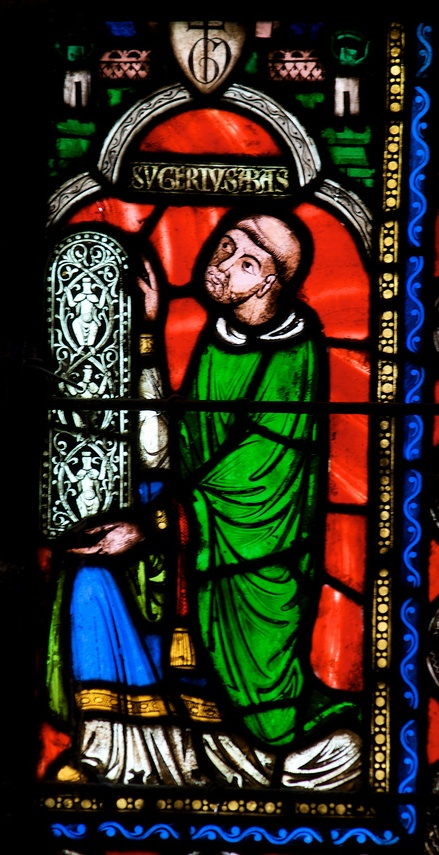
- Suger in the Tree of Jesse window at St-Denis

Personal life
- Born: c. 1081, likely in Chennevières-lès-Louvres
- Died: 13 January 1151 (aged ~70) Saint-Denis
- Resting place: Basilica of Saint-Denis

Religious life
- Religion: Christianity

Suger (/suːˈʒɛər/; French: [syʒɛʁ]; Latin: Sugerius; c. 1081 – 13 January 1151) was a French abbot and statesman. He was a key advisor to King Louis VI and his son Louis VII, acting as the latter's regent during the Second Crusade. His writings are seminal texts for early 12th-century Capetian history, and his reconstruction of the Basilica of Saint-Denis, where he was abbot, was instrumental in creating the Gothic architecture style.

== Early life ==
Suger was born into a family of minor knights c. 1081 (or 1080), landholders at Chennevières-lès-Louvres, a small village surrounding Saint-Denis in northern Paris. Suger was given as an oblate to the abbey of Saint-Denis at age ten in 1091. He claimed humble origins, but may have come from a family of some substance. He trained at the priory of Saint-Denis de L'Estrée for about a decade, where he would have first met the future king Louis VI of France. (Note: Their friendship may have been shortlived for Louis had left the abbey's schooling in 1092: whilst it is not certain that the two were friends yet, it is not unlikely given the cozy number of students present. In 1124, Louis refers to Suger as a "faithful and familiar" companion (Jules Tardif, Monuments historiques, no. 391).) Suger took up the oblate life relatively easily and showed strong ability including in Latin and a firm grasp of legal matters. This ability led to him being chosen to work in the abbey archives to find documents that could protect the abbey from usurpation by Bouchard II of Montmorency, where historians speculate of his involvement in the appearance of a forged charter—if this was Suger's work, then it is certainly a fitting reflection and early example of his close admiration of the abbey. (Note: Lindy Grant, Abbot Suger of St-Denis: Church and State in Early Twelfth-Century France (Essex: Addison Wesley Longman, 1998) p. 80, fn. 30.)

Suger began a successful career in monastic administration as he went on several missions for his abbey, which held land at several vantage points across the country. Finding favour with Abbot Adam of Saint-Denis, Suger became his secretary in 1106, which helped develop Suger's political career. (Note: Suger has a tendency to downplay Abbot Adam's achievements: these are explored in Rolf Große, "L'abbé Adam, Prédécesseur De Suger," in Rolf Große, ed. Suger en question (Munich: Oldenbourg Wissenschaftsverlag, 2004) pp. 31–43. [in French]) As a result, he was involved in significant events: in the same year, he was at the synod at Poitiers; in the spring of 1107 to attend Pope Paschal II; in 1109, where he met Louis VI again as he sat a dispute between the king and Henry I of England, and; in 1112 at Rome for the second Lateran council. During this time, he held administrative roles that required him to be first at Berneval in Normandy in 1108 as provost, then from mid-1109 to 1111 provost to the more important priory of Toury. The area was suffering as a result of Hugh III of Le Puiset's exploitation of revenues, and a series of disputes and failing alliances gave Suger experience on the battlefield. He appeared to take up this new challenge well and was successful, though would go on to heavily regret his involvement in warfare by his sixties. There is a gap in sources on Suger's whereabouts after he left Toury in 1112, though he was likely advancing his monastic position alongside working on further negotiations.

It is from 1118 when the sources start again, where Suger is deeply entrenched in royal affairs. He is chosen as the royal envoy to welcome the fleeing Pope Gelasius II (John of Gaetani) to France and arrange a meeting with Louis VI. (Note: Pope Paschal II dies January 1118; John of Gaetani is made the new pope, becoming Gelasius II; Henry V marched on Rome and appointed Gregory (VIII) as an antipope; Gelasius fled to France to the protection of Louis VI.) Suger was sent to live at the court of Gelasius at Maguelonne, and later at his successor Pope Calixtus II's court in Italy in 1121. It was on his return from in March 1122 that Suger, aged 41, learned of Abbot Adam's death and that the others at the abbey had elected him to be the new abbot. Suger took pride in the fact that this happened in his absence and without his knowledge—whilst Louis was initially enraged at the fact that the decision was made without him being consulted first, he was clearly content with Suger assuming the role, as the two enjoyed a strong working relationship.

== Court life and influence ==
Suger served as the friend and counsellor to both Louis VI and Louis VII. Until 1127, he occupied himself at court mainly with the temporal affairs of the kingdom, while during the following decade he devoted himself to the reorganization and reform of St-Denis. In 1137 he accompanied the future Louis VII into Aquitaine for marriage to Eleanor of Aquitaine. He bitterly opposed the later divorce, having advised the marriage.

Though Suger was openly against Louis VII's intention announced in 1145 to lead a Second Crusade to rescue the Kingdom of Jerusalem, a council in February 1147 elected Suger to be a regent. (Note: Initially, Suger and William, count of Nevers were chosen in an election dominated by St Bernard, with the rationale as "twin swords—the ecclesiastical and securar—[to] protect the realm." William's imminent retirement as a monk meant that Ralph of Vermandois and, to a lesser degree, Archbishop Samson of Reims, to be co-regents with Suger. Grant, Church and State, 157.) One of the reasons Suger was opposed to the crusade were the issues present in France at the time: Louis VII wrote shortly after setting out to ensure protection of Gisors, and only six weeks after his expedition, asking for money, asking Suger to use some from his own resources if necessary. (Note: "sive de nostro seu de vestro pecuniam sumptam nobis mittatis," [whether you send us money taken from us or from you,] in Recueil des Historiensdes Des Gaules et de la France, ed. Martin Bouquet et al. (Paris, 1869–1904) vol 15, p. 487.) He urged the king to destroy the feudal bandits, he was responsible for the royal tactics in dealing with the communal movements, and he endeavoured to regularize the administration of justice. He left his abbey, which possessed considerable property, enriched and embellished by the construction of a new church built in the nascent Gothic style. Suger wrote extensively on the construction of the abbey in Liber de Rebus in Administratione sua Gestis, Libellus Alter de Consecratione Ecclesiae Sancti Dionysii, and Ordinatio.

After the regency, Louis VII and his contemporaries still consulted Suger on matters ecclesiastical and political, and he was asked to defend cases at court. At this point, Suger was also being assigned cases to work on lone which would otherwise be given to an episcopal commission to deal with lone. Louis VII gave Suger the task of resolving two episcopal elections, at which point Suger practically continued to hold the same level of control over the church of France as he would have had as regent.

Following the failure of the Second Crusade and letters from the Jerusalem and Pope Eugenius, Suger proposed a new crusade at a convention in Laon in 1150, with the support of Louis and St Bernard. The aim was to have a crusade led by Suger and run by the French church to do what the secular powers failed to do. Support for this fell apart from many churchmen, including the pope losing belief in the pursuit and advising the king to remain in France to settle local issues. The matter troubled Suger to his final year of his life, at which point he nominated an unnamed nobleman to take his stead in battle, though it ultimately did not materialise as the idea was likely shelved by that point.

Suger's final year continued to be busy for him, as he was instructed by the pope to reform Saint Corneille at Compiègne. Odo of Deuil's appointment as abbot had the backing of Louis VII and Suger, though after the two left, it was met with violent resistance by the canons (as was the case at Sainte-Geneviève).

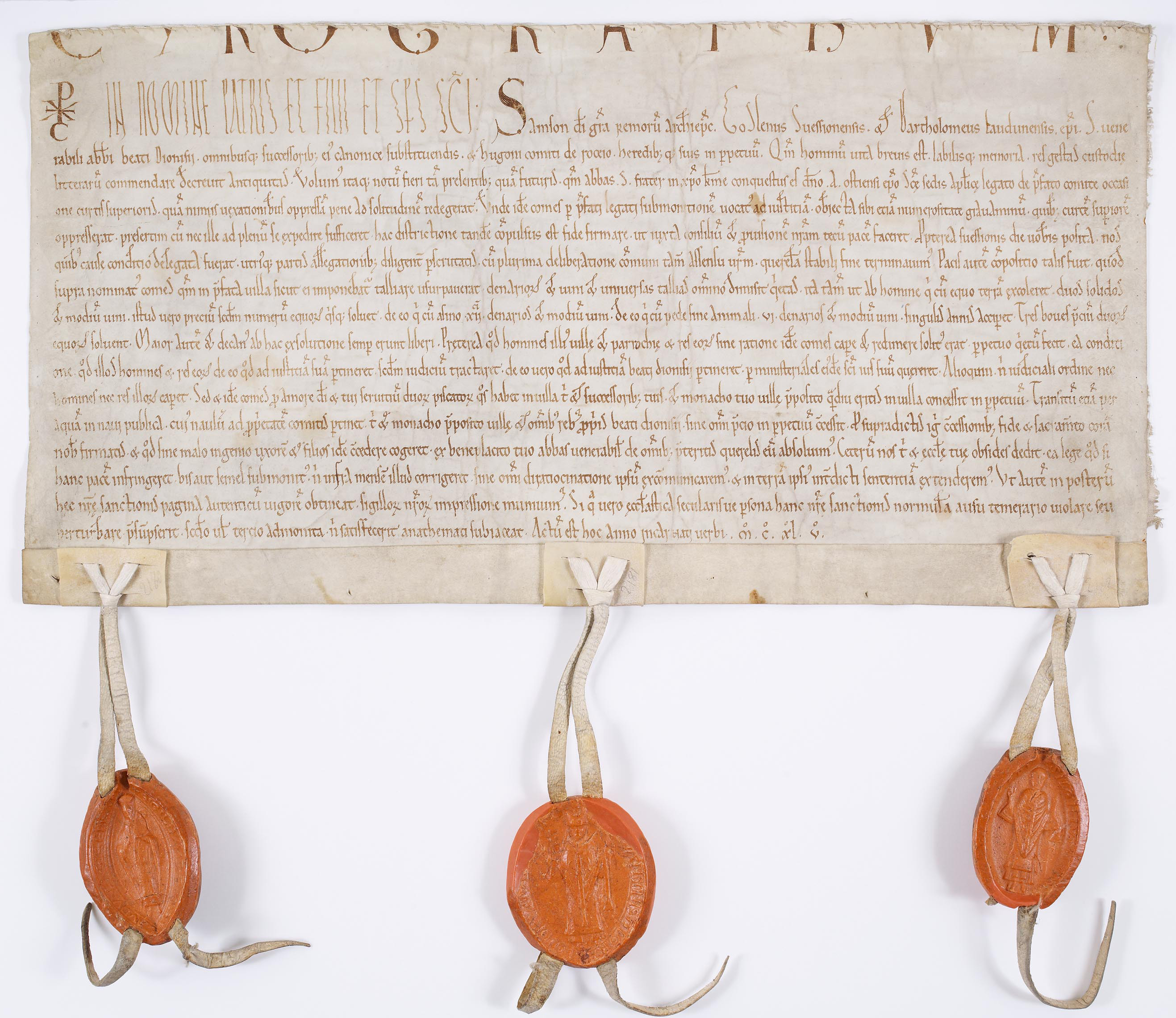
Agreement between Suger and the count of Roucy

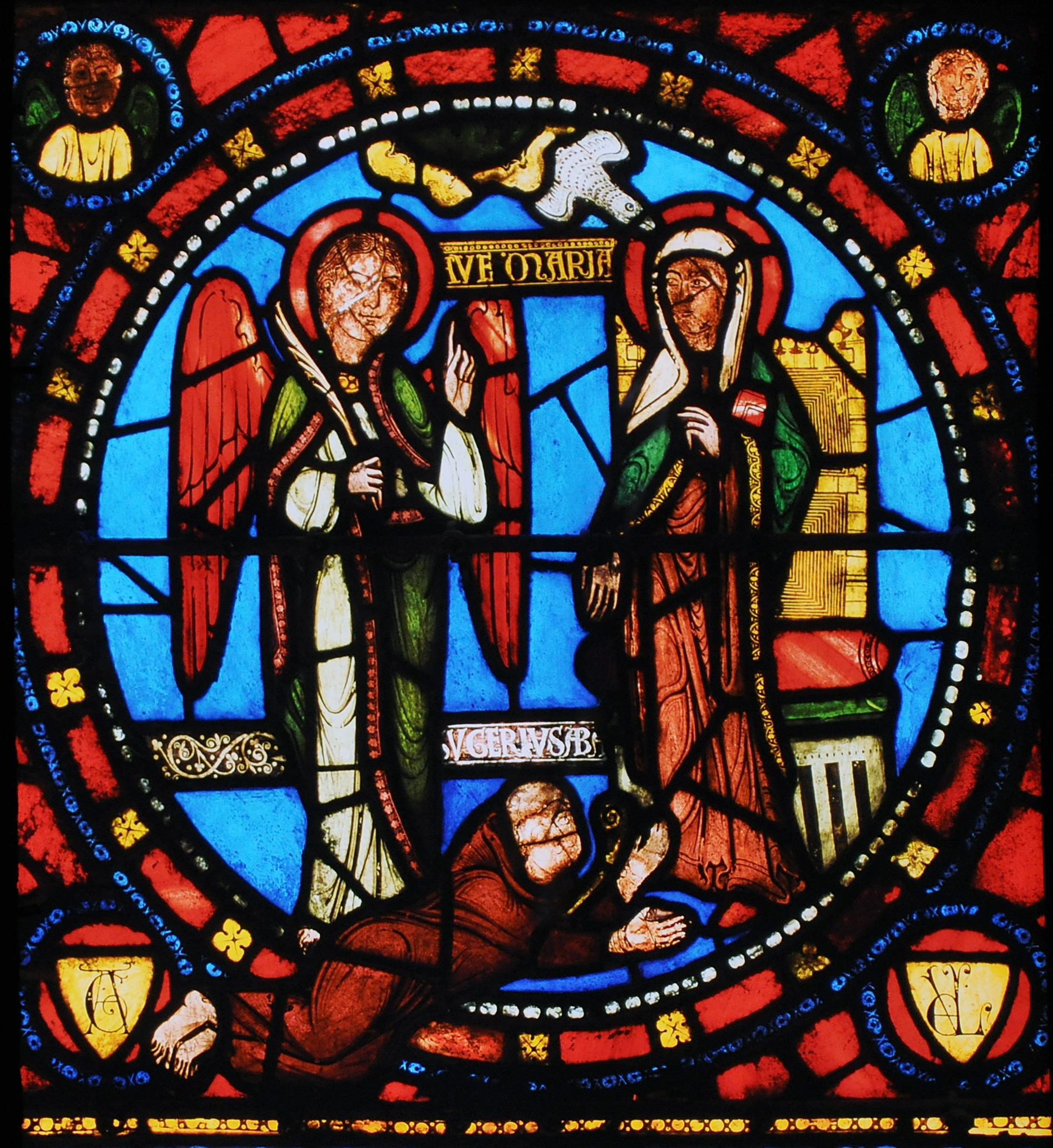
The Annunciation pane of the Infancy Window, showing Suger, the patron, at the feet of Mary.

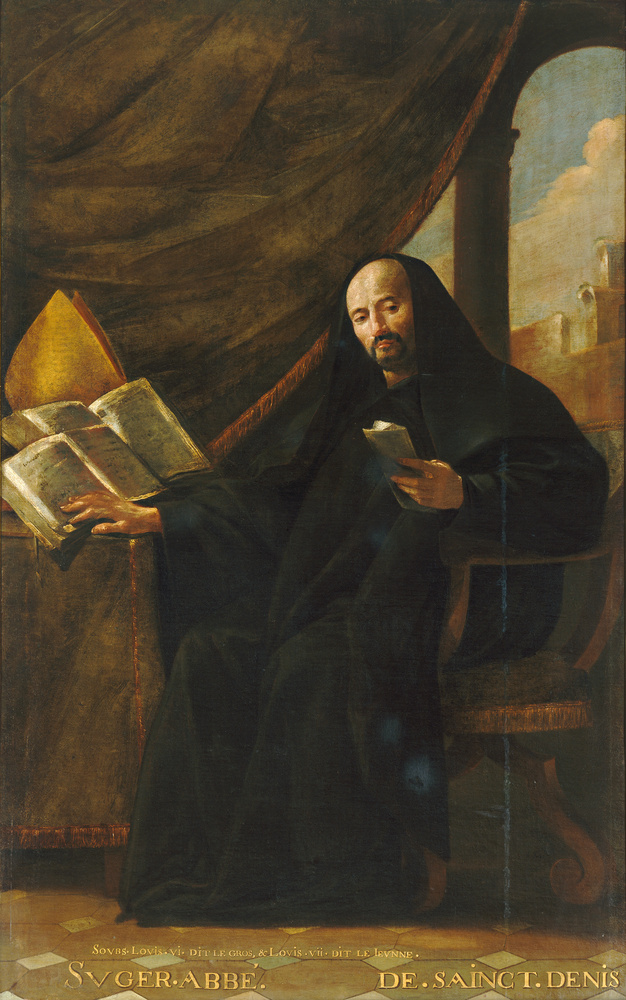
A painting by Simon Vouet of Suger (1633), held at the Musée d'Arts de Nantes.

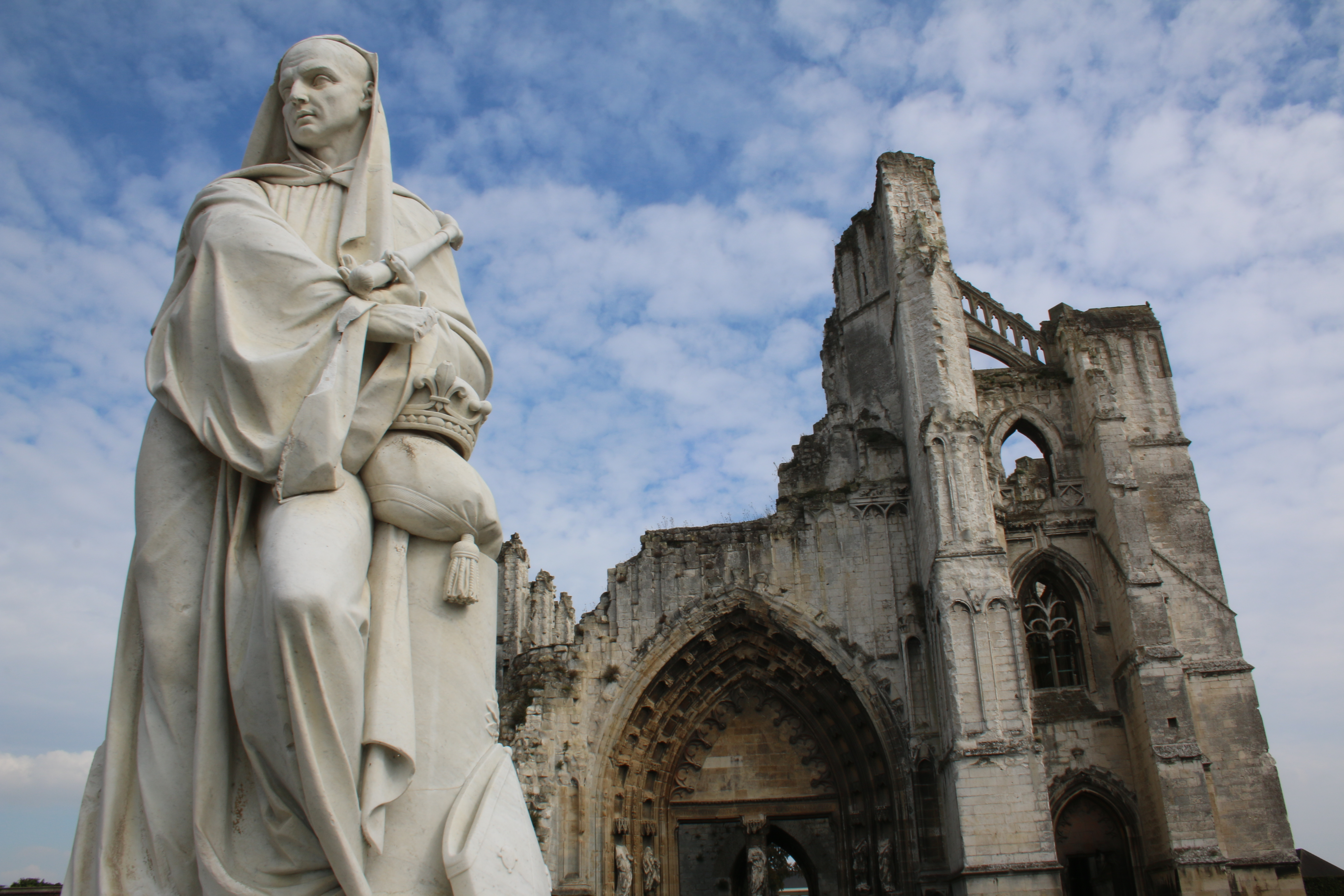
A marble statue by Jean-Baptiste Stouf (1836). Today, it stands in front of the ruins of Saint-Bertin Abbey, Saint-Omer.

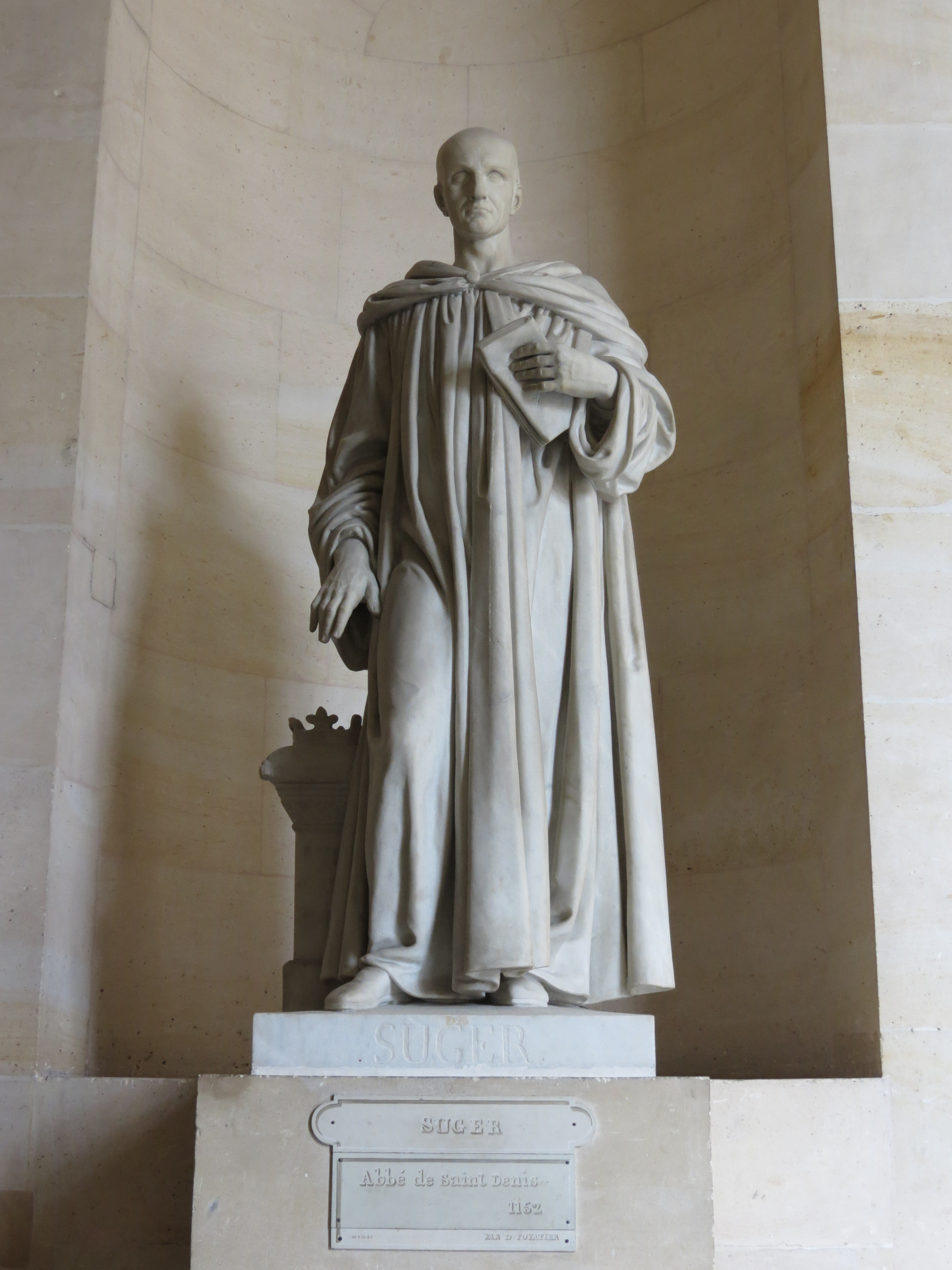
A neoclassical sculpture by Denis Foyatier (1835) in the Palace of Versailles.

Today, a French street is named after Suger, and two schools bear his name (Lycée Suger in Saint-Denis, and École secondaire Suger in Vaucresson).

== Contribution to the arts ==
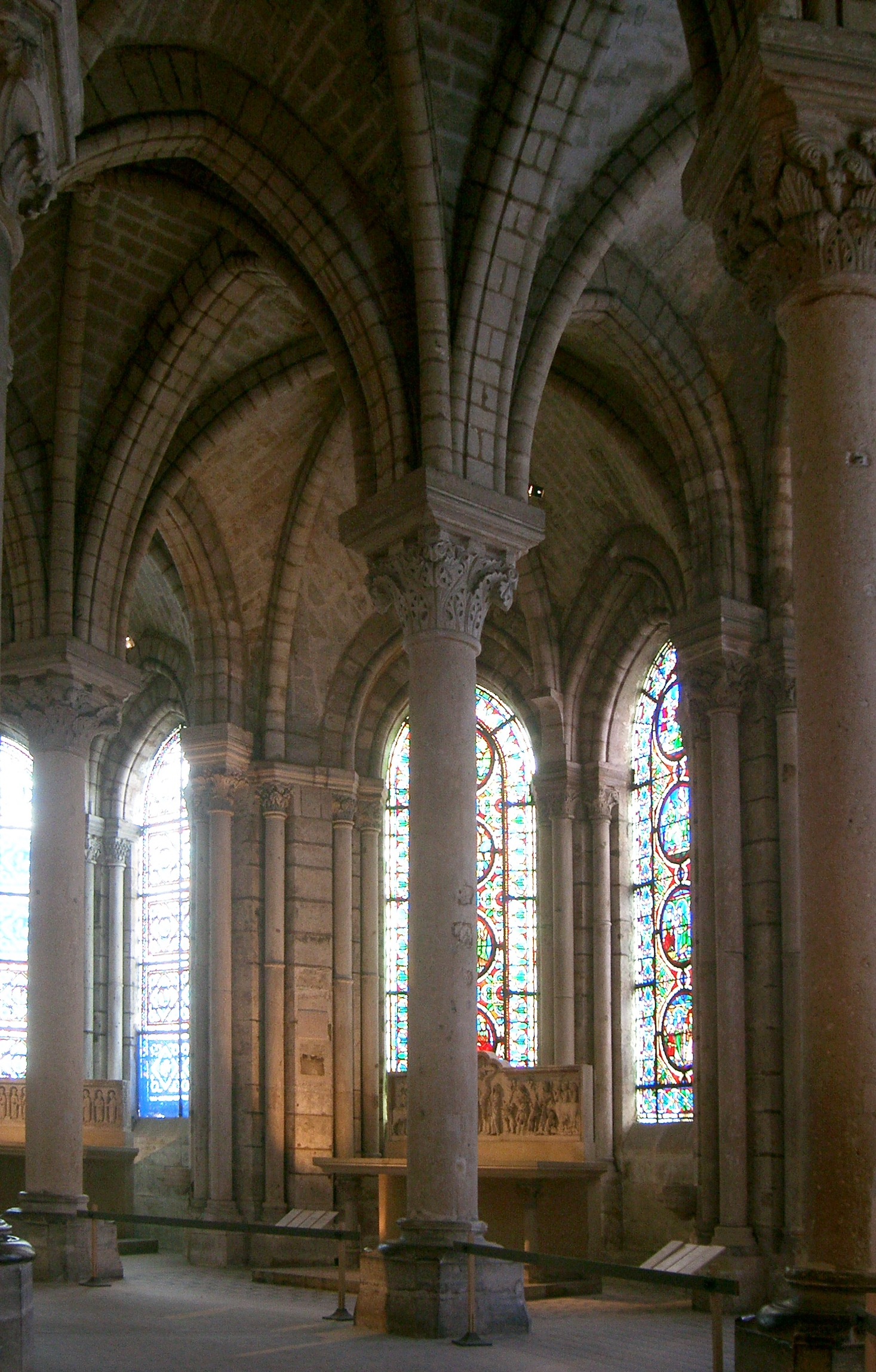
Gothic ambulatory at Saint-Denis

=== Abbey of Saint-Denis ===
Prior to Suger's abbacy, the Abbey of Saint-Denis was a significant site, with a long tradition of royal burials dating back to the 6th century. Thus, when Suger was appointed to be its abbot, the tie between monarchy and church became even closer. Ideas to renovate the small and aging abbey arose as early as 1124, when he began to take in funds for the project—but work on the full rebuild as did not begin until 1137. The idea of a full rebuild and what it should look like was a gradual development over time. Early ideas were sporadic and undeveloped, with Suger mostly preoccupied with state affairs. Ground was first broken in 1130 to rebuild the old nave, with ideas of importing in classical columns from Rome, though this was an act rendered moot by the eventual decision for a full rebuild. The rebuild was not something Suger could have given much of his time to until the and ascension of Louis VII, who wished to have his own set of advisors alongside his father's.

Suger began with the west front, reconstructing the original Carolingian façade with its single door. He designed the façade to be an echo of the Roman Arch of Constantine with its three-part division and three large portals to ease the problem of congestion. The rose window above the west portal is the earliest-known such example, although Romanesque circular windows preceded it in general form.

At the completion of the west front in 1140, Suger moved on to the reconstruction of the eastern end, leaving the Carolingian nave in use. He designed a choir (chancel) that would be suffused with light. (Note: When the new rear part is joined to that in front, The church shines, brightened in its middle. For bright is that which is brightly coupled with the bright And which the new light pervades, Bright is the noble work Enlarged in our time I, who was Suger, having been leader While it was accomplished. Abbot Suger: On What Was Done in His Administration c.1144–8, Chap XXVIII) (Note: Erwin Panofsky argued that Suger was inspired to create a physical representation of the Heavenly Jerusalem, however the extent to which Suger had any aims higher than aesthetic pleasure has been called into doubt by more recent art historians on the basis of Suger's own writings.) To achieve his aims, his masons drew on the several new features which evolved or had been introduced to Romanesque architecture, the pointed arch, the ribbed vault, the ambulatory with radiating chapels, the clustered columns supporting ribs springing in different directions and the flying buttresses which enabled the insertion of large clerestory windows.

The structure was finished and dedicated on 11 June 1144, in the presence of the king. The Abbey of Saint-Denis thus became the prototype for further building in the royal domain of northern France. It is often cited as the first building in the Gothic style. A hundred years later, the old nave of Saint-Denis was rebuilt in the Gothic style, gaining in its transepts two spectacular rose windows.

=== Collections ===
Suger was a patron of art. Among the liturgical vessels he commissioned are a gilt eagle, the King Roger decanter, a gold chalice and a sardonyx ewer. A chalice once owned by Suger is now in the collections of the National Gallery of Art in Washington, D.C., and the Eleanor of Aquitaine vase which he received that was subsequently offered to the saints at his abbey is now held in the Louvre in Paris, believed to be the only existing artefact of Eleanor's to exist today.

The vases de Suger series of commissioned vases

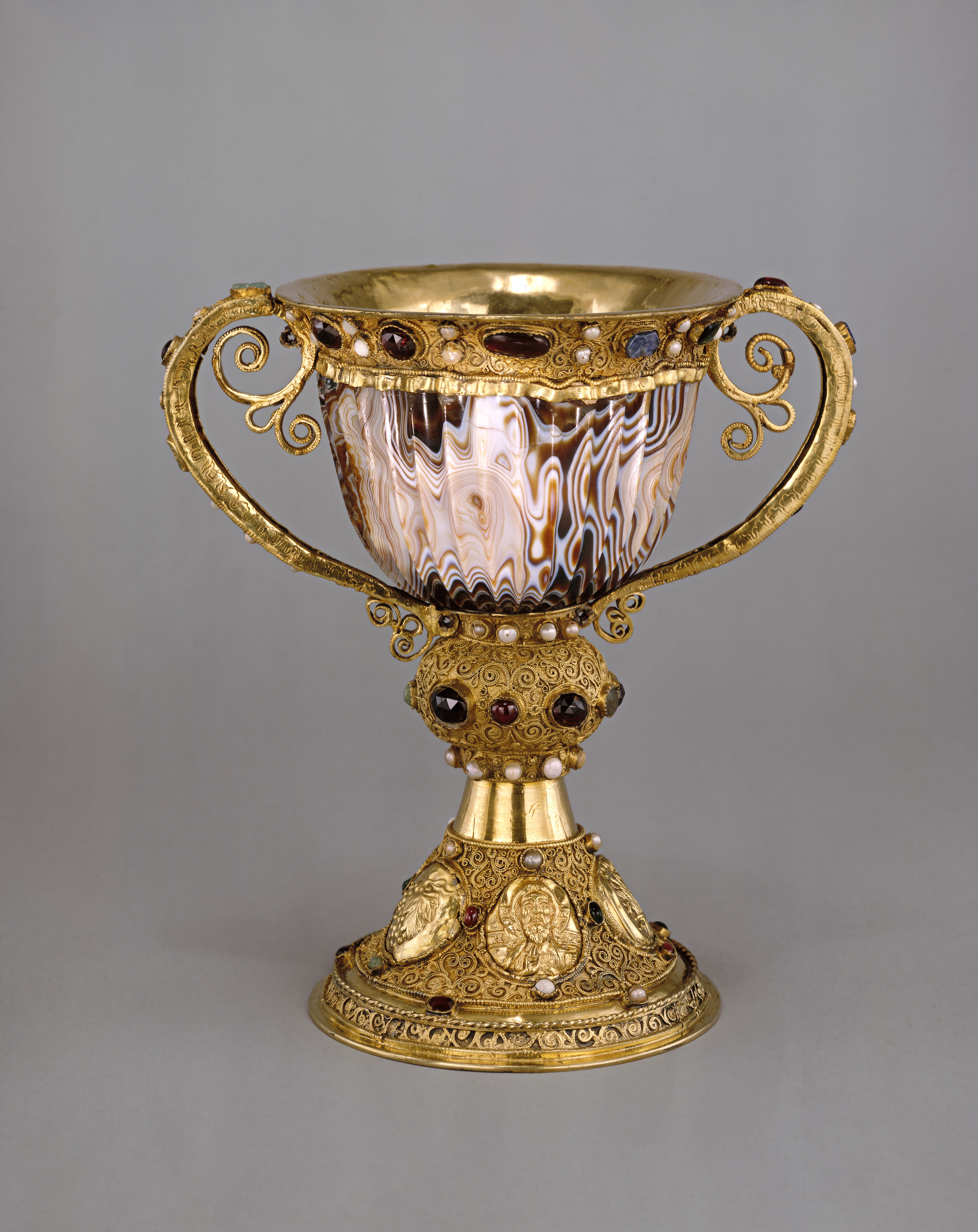
Chalice of Suger, with on onyx cup of the 2nd or 1st century BC.

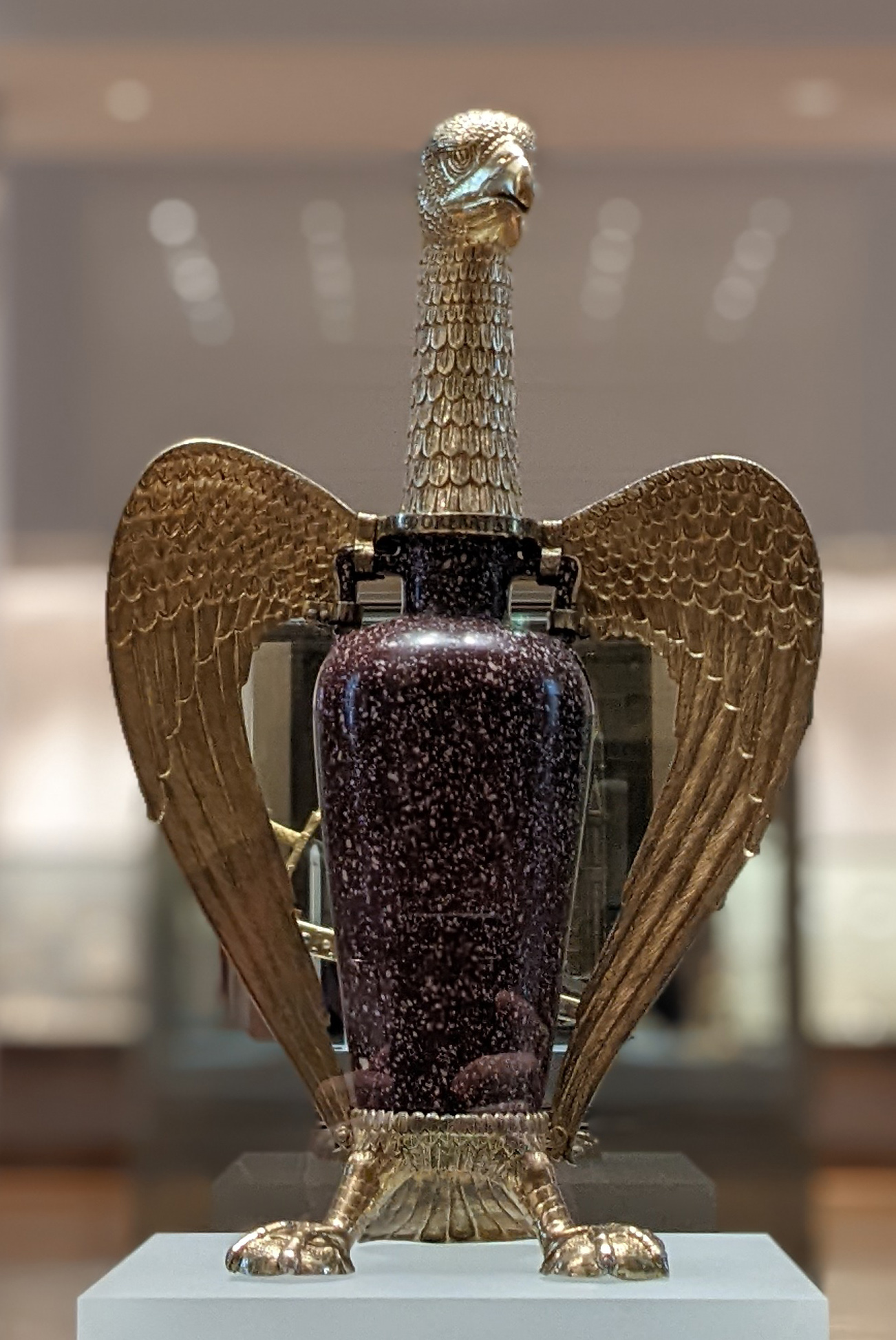
Suger's Eagle, with a 2nd-century porphyry vase.

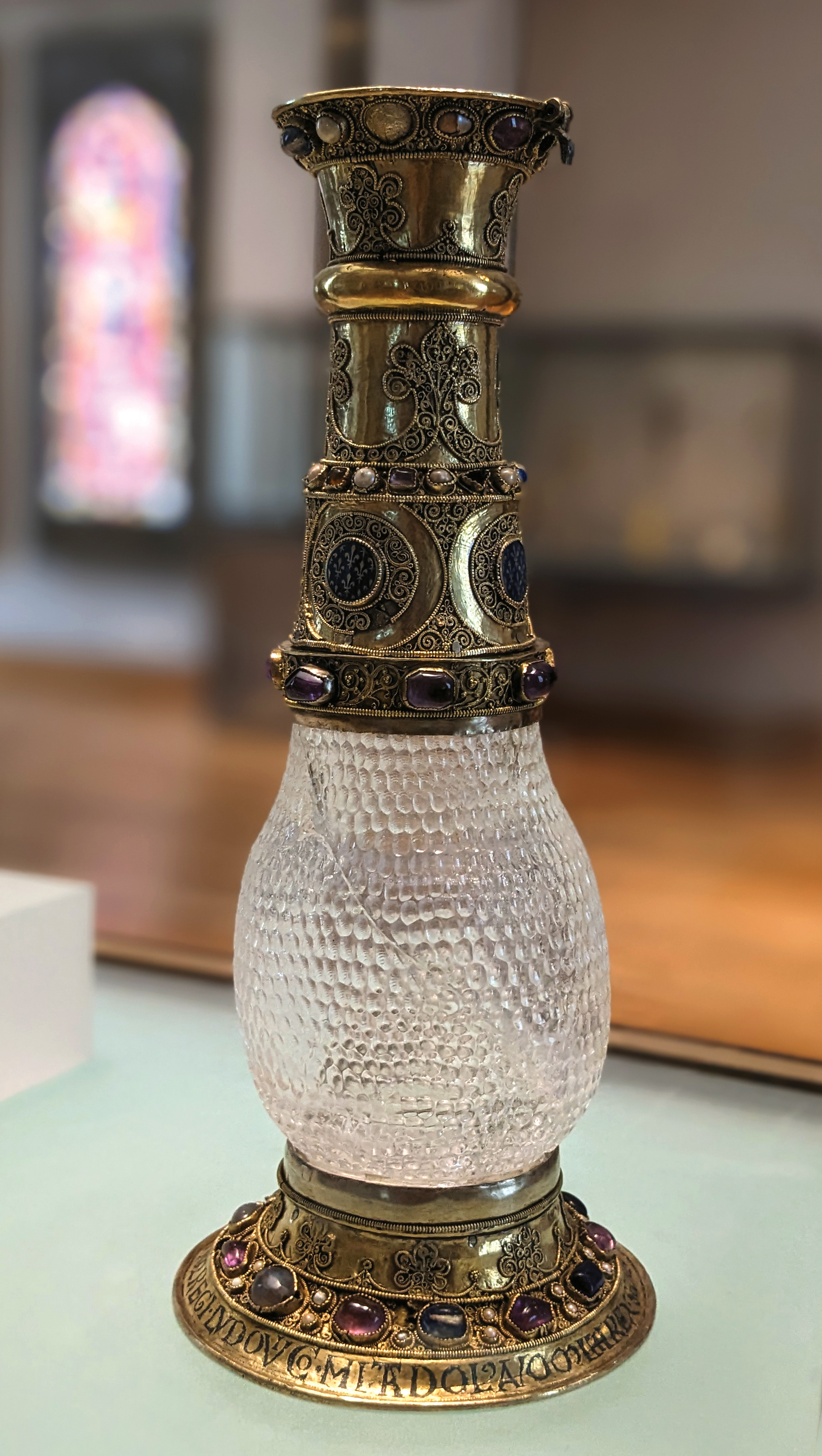
Eleanor of Aquitaine vase, a rock crystal vase from 6th- or 7th-century Persian vessel.

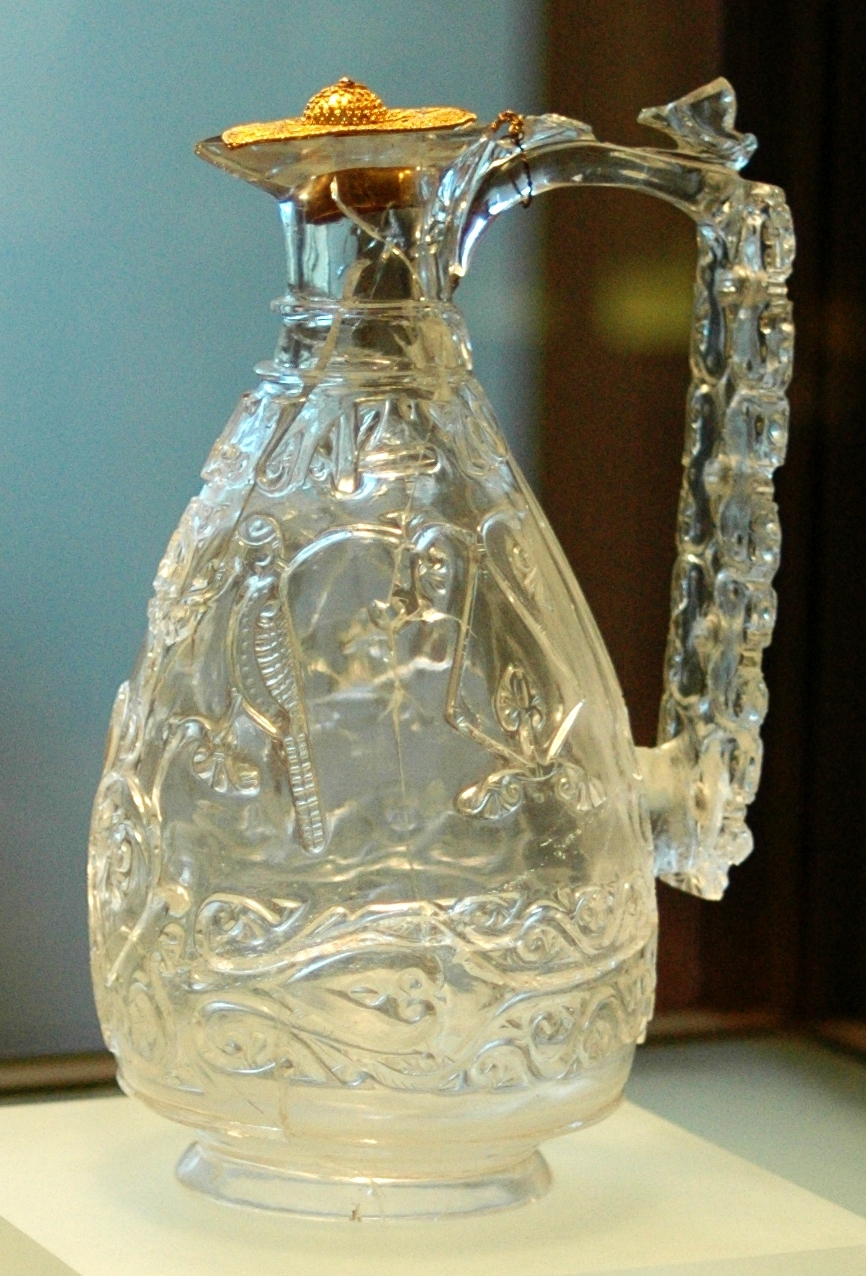
Aiguière aux oiseaux ("Ewer with birds") with a 10th- or 11th-century Egyptian rock-crystal vessel.

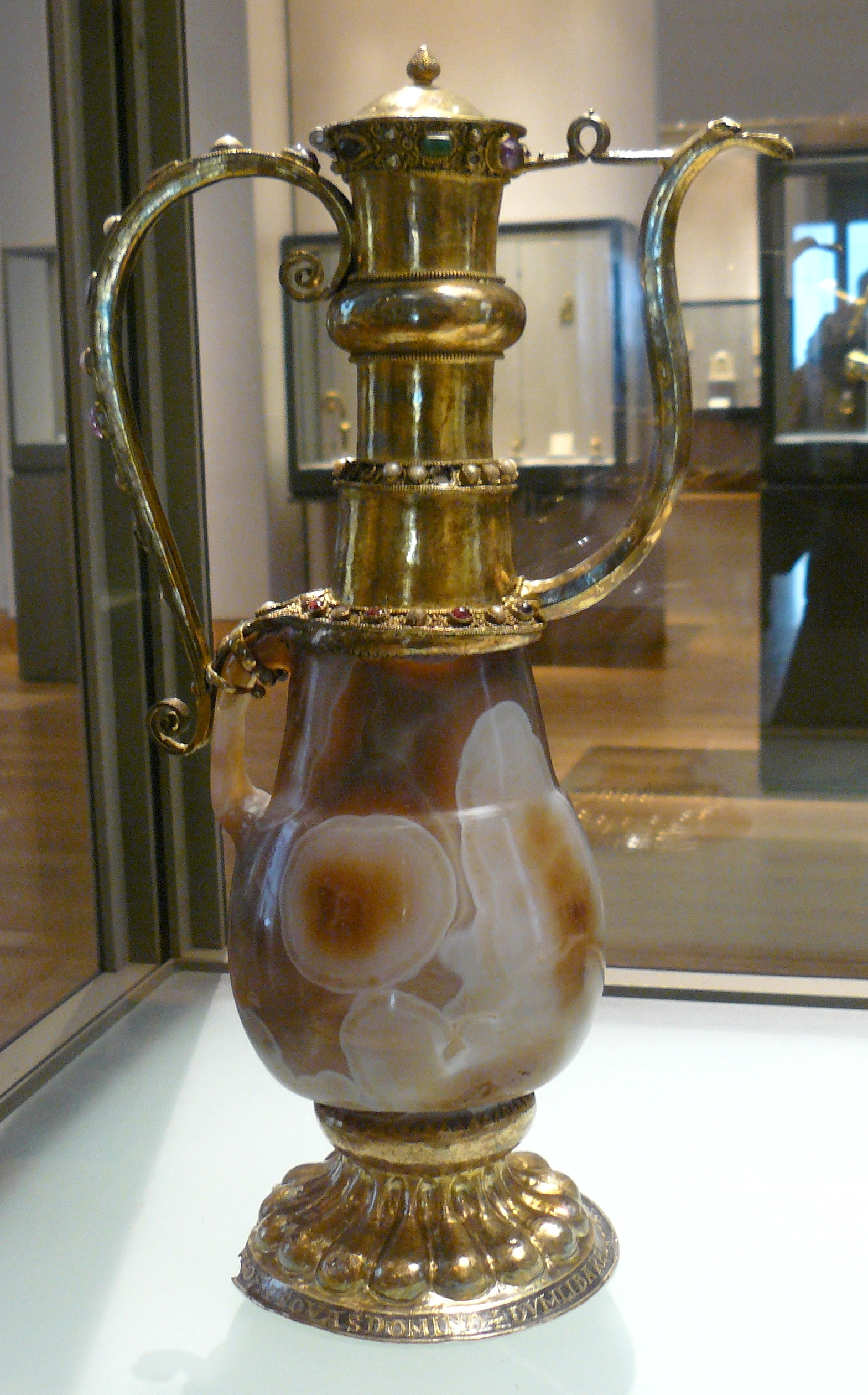
Sardonyx ewer (Aiguière en Sardoine), with a vase possibly from 7th-century Byzantium.

== Historiography ==
=== Works ===
Suger wrote several works, which are regarded for their accuracy and detail. Of these, two record his activities as abbot of St-Denis. The Libellus Alter de Consecratione Ecclesiae Sancti Dionysii (Other Little Book on the Consecration of Saint-Denis) is a short treatise on the building and consecration of the abbey church. The Liber De Rebus in Administratione sua Gestis (Book on Events under his Administration) is an unfinished account of his administration of the abbey, which he started on request of his monks in 1145. In these texts, he treats of the improvements he had made to Saint-Denis, describes the treasure of the church, and gives an account of the rebuilding. Unlike other medieval texts recording the deeds of religious figures, Suger's are written by him.

Of his histories, Vie de Louis le Gros (Life of Louis the Fat) is his most substantial and widely circulated. It is a panegyric chronological narrative of King Louis VI, primarily concerned with warfare but also his dependence on the abbey of Saint-Denis. Historia gloriosi regis Ludovici (The Illustrious King Louis) is the other demonstrably unfinished work of Suger, accounting for the first year of Louis VII's reign. Written in Suger's final years, it (like his other history) covers in great detail events where Suger was present or involved.

Suger's secretary William produced two works on Suger: the first, a letter shortly after his death announcing the death; the other a short biography (Sugerii Vita; The Life of Suger) authored between 1152 and 1154. (Note: After Suger’s death, William’s leading of a faction against the new abbot at Saint Denis, Odo of Deuil, meant he was exiled. It was during exile that he authored the life of Suger; it was thus intended to portray Suger in good light, implicitly criticising Odo. Grant, Church and State, 44.) A collection of Suger's letters exist in Saint-Denis, mostly from near the end of his life, though its provenance is unknown. Suger's works served to imbue the monks of Saint-Denis with a taste for history and called forth a long series of quasi-official chronicles.

=== Gothic tradition ===
Suger is considered the forerunner of (French) Gothic architecture; his work is placed in the Early Gothic (Gothique primitif) period concentrated in the Île-de-France region of France. This genre is seen as the progression of Romanesque architecture, though few of the key elements that define the Gothic tradition were particularly new as they were inspired by these very Romanesque elements, especially those of Normandy and Burgundy. The key element that sets aside Gothic architecture from its predecessor is "the novelty of the spiritual message that was to be conveyed" using its "novel and anti-Romanesque" elements.

Scholars tend to attribute Suger's influences on his ideas of symbolism and manner of symbolic thought to interpretations of Pseudo-Dionysius the Areopagite and the derivates of John Scotus Eriugena, as well as those from the school of Chartres. (Note: There are three Dionysiuses who have been confused and interchanged throughout history: Dionysius the Areopagite, an Athenian first century judge and saint; Pseudo-Dionysius the Areopagite, a Greek author of the fifth/sixth century who pseudepigraphically (falsely) identified as the former and wrote Christian theological and mystical works; and saint Dionysius of Paris, or Denis of Paris, after whom the abbey is named after.) Where 19th-century art historian Erwin Panofsky claims that the theology of Pseudo-Dionysius influenced the architectural style of the abbey of Saint-Denis, later scholars argue against such a simplistic link between philosophy and architectural form. (Note: For a summary of the 'arguments against' Panofsky's view, see Panofsky, Suger and St Denis, Peter Kidson, Journal of the Warburg and Courtauld Institutes, Vol. 50, (1987), pp. 1–17.) Though Suger did not leave any explicitly theological writings, his work on Saint-Denis was inspired by his own set of religious ideas influenced by a range of new or renewed theological themes in the wider context of 12th-century France. The influence of the cosmology of the Chartres school, which resulted from interpretations of Plato and the Bible, created a speculative system which emphasised mathematics, particularly geometry, and the aesthetic outcomes that arise from the convergence of the two. (Note: Further reading: Neoplatonism and Christianity#Middle_Ages, and von Simson, The Gothic Cathedral, pp. 25–39.)

Art historians paint Gothic architecture as Suger's own creation, though some question this. The assumption by 19th-century French authors that Suger was the "designer" of Saint-Denis (and hence the "inventor" of Gothic architecture) has been discounted by recent scholars. Instead he is generally seen as having been a bold and imaginative patron who encouraged the work of an innovative (but now unknown) master mason. It is difficult to contextualise Saint-Denis using other buildings of the time and place, because many churches in Capetian France between 1080 and 1160 were destroyed and/or rebuilt later, combined with the fact that no other building of this period enjoyed the level of precision and detail of Suger's accounts of Saint-Denis. Thus, the Gothic style can be seen as a multiplicity of trends in the architecture of this period, some occasionally intersecting with others: Jean Bony describes it as "a happy accident of history; it would have been infinitely more normal if the Gothic had never appeared."

== Citations ==
=== Bibliography ===
==== Contemporary works ====
- Suger. "Liber de Rebus in Administratione sua Gestis." In Abbot Suger, on the Abbey Church of St.-Denis and Its Art Treasures. Edited, translated, and annotated by Erwin Panofsky (and Gerda Panofsky-Soergel). Princeton: Princeton University Press, 1946, pp. 40–81.
- ———. "Libellus Alter de Consecratione Ecclesiae Sancti Dionysii." In Abbot Suger, on the Abbey Church of St.-Denis and Its Art Treasures. Edited, translated, and annotated by Erwin Panofsky (and Gerda Panofsky-Soergel). Princeton: Princeton University Press, 1946, pp. 82–121.
- ———. "Ordinatio AD. MCXL vel MCXLI confirmata." In Abbot Suger, on the Abbey Church of St.-Denis and its Art Treasures. Edited, translated, and annotated by Erwin Panofsky (and Gerda Panofsky-Soergel). Princeton: Princeton University Press, 1946, pp. 122–37.
- ———. The Deeds of Louis the Fat. [Vie de Louis le Gros] Translated by Richard C. Cusimano and John Moorhead. Washington D. C.: The Catholic University of America Press, 1992.

Selected Works of Abbot Suger of Saint-Denis. Translated by Richard Cusimano and Eric Whitmore. Washington D.C.: The Catholic University of America Press, 2018.

Selected Works of Abbot Sugar of Saint-Denis: Letters and Charters. Translated by Richard Cusimano, Eric Whitmore, and Michael Bardot. Washington D.C.: The Catholic University of America Press, 2026.

- William (Willelmus). "The Life of Suger." [Sugerii Vita] In [https://books.google.com/books?id=bJNFDwAAQBAJ&pg=PA184 Selected Works of Abbot Suger of Saint Denis. Translated by Richard C. Cusimano and Eric Whitmore. Washington D. C.: The Catholic University of America Press, 2018, pp. 184–216.
- Oeuvres complètes de Suger; recueillies, annotées et publiées d'après les manuscrits. [complete Latin manuscripts, available at Gallica BNF ]. Edited by Albert Lecoy de La Marche. Paris, 1867.

==== Books ====
- Aubert, Marcel. Suger. [in French] Paris: Fontenelle Collection (Figures monastiques), 1950. OCLC WorldCat 1746084 / 778897850.
- Cartellieri, Otto. Abt Suger von Saint-Denis. [in German] Berlin: Matthiesen Verlag, Lübeck/Kraus Reprint Ltd, 1898.
- Crosby, Sumner McKnight. The Royal Abbey of Saint-Denis, from its beginnings to the death of Suger, 475–1151. New Haven: Yale University Press, 1987. OCLC WorldCat 12805708.
- ———. The Royal Abbey of Saint-Denis, in the Time of Abbot Suger (1122–1151). [open access ] New York: The Metropolitan Museum of Art, 1981. OCLC WorldCat 7197399.
- Grant, Lindy. Abbot Suger of St-Denis: Church and State in Early Twelfth-Century France. Essex: Addison Wesley Longman, 1998. OCLC WorldCat 37509848.
- Gerson, Paula Lieber, ed. Abbot Suger and Saint-Denis: a Symposium. [available at Met OCLC ] New York: The Metropolitan Museum of Art, 1986.
- Große, Rolf, ed. Suger en question. [in French, available at De Gruyter ] Munich: Oldenbourg Wissenschaftsverlag, 2004.
- Rudolph, Conrad. Artistic Change at St-Denis: Abbot Suger's Program and the Early Twelfth-Century Controversy over Art. Princeton: Princeton University Press, 1990. OCLC WorldCat 614916294.
- von Simson, Otto. The Gothic Cathedral: Origins of Gothic Architecture and the Medieval Concept of Order. 3rd ed. Princeton: Princeton University Press, 1988. OCLC WorldCat 17476906.

==== Journal articles ====
- Hugenholtz, Frits, and Henk Teunis. "Suger's advice." Journal of Medieval History 12, no. 3 (1986), pp. 191–206. DOI: 10.1016/0304-4181(86)90031-X.
- Inglis, Erik. "Remembering and Forgetting Suger at Saint-Denis, 1151–1534: An Abbot's Reputation between Memory and History." Gesta 54, no. 2 (September 2015), pp. 219–43. JSTOR.
- Kidson, Peter. "Panofsky, Suger and St Denis." Journal of the Warburg and Courtauld Institutes 50 (1987), pp. 1–17. JSTOR.
- Rudolph, Conrad. "Inventing the Exegetical Stained-Glass Window: Suger, Hugh, and a New Elite Art." The Art Bulletin 93, no. 4 (December 2011), pp. 399–422. JSTOR.
