= Samson of Mauvoisin =

French archbishop

Samson of Mauvoisin or Reims (died 1161) was the French archbishop of Reims from 1140 to 1161.

He is a significant historical figure of his times. He undertook the capture of Eon d'Etoile, self-proclaimed Messiah. He was concerned about heresy spread by weavers.

He acted for Queen Eleanor in her divorce case from King Louis VII. He participated in the general declaration of peace made by Louis at Soissons, in 1155.

Catholic Church titles
Preceded by Rainaldus de Martigny	Archbishop of Reims; 1140–1161	Succeeded by Henry of France
