= Manfred (given name) =

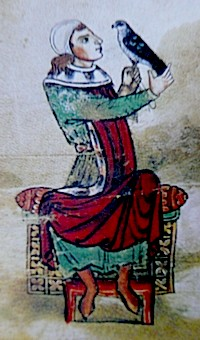
- Manfred of Sicily
- Gender: Masculine
- Language: Alemannic

Origin
- Origin: German
- Meaning: Man of peace or peaceful protector

Manfred is a given name of Alemannic origin, being derived from man ('man') and fridu ('peace, security'), meaning "man of peace".

People with the given name include:

- Manfred of Gallura, first Judge of Gallura, c.1020–c.1040
- Manfred of Pécs (died 1306), Hungarian bishop
- Manfred, King of Sicily (1232–1266), King of Sicily from 1258 to 1266
- Manfred I of Saluzzo (died 1175), Italian leader, first marquess of Saluzzo
- Manfred II of Saluzzo (1140–1215), Italian leader, second marquess of Saluzzo
- Manfred III of Saluzzo (died 1244), Italian leader, third marquess of Saluzzo
- Manfred IV of Saluzzo (died 1330), Italian leader, fifth marquess of Saluzzo
- Manfred, Duke of Athens (1306–1317), infante of Sicily
- Manfred V of Saluzzo Italian leader, marquess of Saluzzo 1330–1332, usurper 1341–1342
- Count Manfred Beckett Czernin (1913–1962), Austrian aviator
- Count Manfred von Clary-Aldringen (1852–1928), Austro-Hungarian nobleman and statesman
- Manfred Beer (born 1953), East German biathlete
- Manfred Binz (born 1965), German footballer
- Manfred Bischoff (born 1942), German businessman
- Manfred Böckl (1948–2026), German writer
- Manfred Burgsmüller (1949–2019), German footballer
- Manfred Dikkers (drummer)
- Manfred Donike (1933–1995), German cyclist
- Manfred Eicher (born 1943), German record producer
- Manfred Eigen (1927–2019), German biophysical chemist
- Manfred Feher, Austrian table tennis player
- Manfred Fuchs (1938–2014), Italian-German space entrepreneur
- Manfred Gerstenfeld (1937–2021), Austrian-born Israeli writer
- Manfred Kaltz (born 1953), German footballer
- Manfred Kanther (born 1939), German politician
- Manfred Kreuz (1936–2026), German footballer
- Manfred Krug (1937–2016), German actor and singer
- Manfred Kuhmichel (1943–2026), German politician
- Manfred Mann (musician) (born 1940), South Africa-born British keyboard player
- Manfred Maurus (died 2008), German scientist
- Manfred Messerschmidt (1926–2022), German historian
- Manfred Minnich (1923–1985), German musician
- Manfred Misselhorn (born 1938), German rower
- Manfred Moore (1950–2020), American football player
- Manfred Oggier (born 1972), Swiss footballer
- Manfred Reyes (born 1955), Bolivian politician
- Manfred von Richthofen (1892–1918), German World War I ace, the "Red Baron"
- Manfred Rommel (1928–2013), mayor of Stuttgart, son of Erwin
- Manfred Schiller (born 1961), German politician
- Manfred Schumann (born 1951), West German bobsledder
- Manfred Susskind (1891–1957), South African cricketer
- Manfred Winkelhock (1951–1985), German racing driver
- Manfred Wolke (1943–2024), German boxer
- Manfred Wörner (1934–1994), German politician and diplomat

=== Fictional characters ===
- Manfred von Karma, prosecutor and father of Franziska von Karma, in the franchise Ace Attorney
