= Beatrice of Sicily =

Beatrice of Sicily may refer to:

- Beatrice of Sicily, Latin Empress (1252–1275), consort of Philip of Courtenay
- Beatrice of Sicily (1260–1307), daughter of Manfred of Sicily, wife of Manfred IV, Marquess of Saluzzo
- Beatrice of Sicily (1326–1365), daughter of Peter II of Sicily, wife of Rupert II of the Rhine
