= Marquisate of Saluzzo =

Italian state (1125–1548)

Coordinates: 44°39′N 07°29′E

Marquisate of Saluzzo Marchionatus de Salutia (Latin)
- 1142–1548
- Flag (14th century–c. 1507) Aleramici (Argent a chief azure)
- Motto: Noch, noch e Ne pour ce (Latin) "Ancòra, ancòra" e "Non sol per questo" (Italian) "Still, still" and "Not just for this reason"
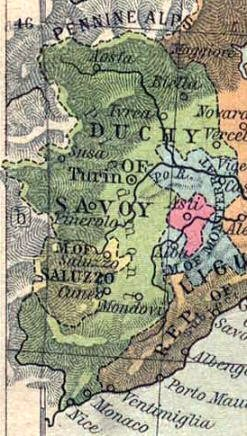
- Map of Italy in 1494. Saluzzo is to the southwest, in yellow
- Capital: Saluzzo
- Common languages: Latin; Italian; Piedmontese
- Religion: Roman Catholicism
- Government: Monarchy (Marquistate)
- Marquis
  - 1142–1175: Manfred I of Saluzzo (first)
  - 1537–1548: Gian Gabriele I of Saluzzo (last)
- Historical era: Middle Ages; Early modern
  - Donation of Boniface del Vasto to his son Manfred: 1142
  - Annexion to France: 23 February 1548
Preceded by	Succeeded by
March of Turin	Kingdom of France; Duchy of Savoy
- Today part of: Italy; France

The Marquisate of Saluzzo (Latin: Marchionatus de Salutia) was a historical Italian state that included parts of the current region of Piedmont and of the French Alps. The Marquisate was much older than the Renaissance lordships, being a legacy of the feudalism of the High Middle Ages.

== Marquisate territories ==
The Marquisate of Saluzzo occupied parts of the modern province of Cuneo and Metropolitan City of Turin, and at times areas now under French control; the core of its lands was the area between the Stura di Demonte, the Po and the Alps. The del Vasto family, who ruled Saluzzo throughout its period, also owned other territories in Italy after a series of arranged marriages, but these were never officially annexed to the marquisate.

== Del Vasto rule ==
The House of Del Vasto became masters of the city when Ulric Manfred II of Turin chose to enfeoff Boniface del Vasto as marquis. His eldest son Manfred inherited it. From that moment the del Vasto became Marquis of the Piedmontese town and handed the title dynastically as a true seigniory.

Manfred II tried to extend the marquisate beyond its domain against the House of Savoy. After Manfred's death, his widow Azalaïs had to provide them a number of tributes per year: from these tributes, Savoy established claims of mastery over the marquisate which led them to clash repeatedly against the weak Marquis.

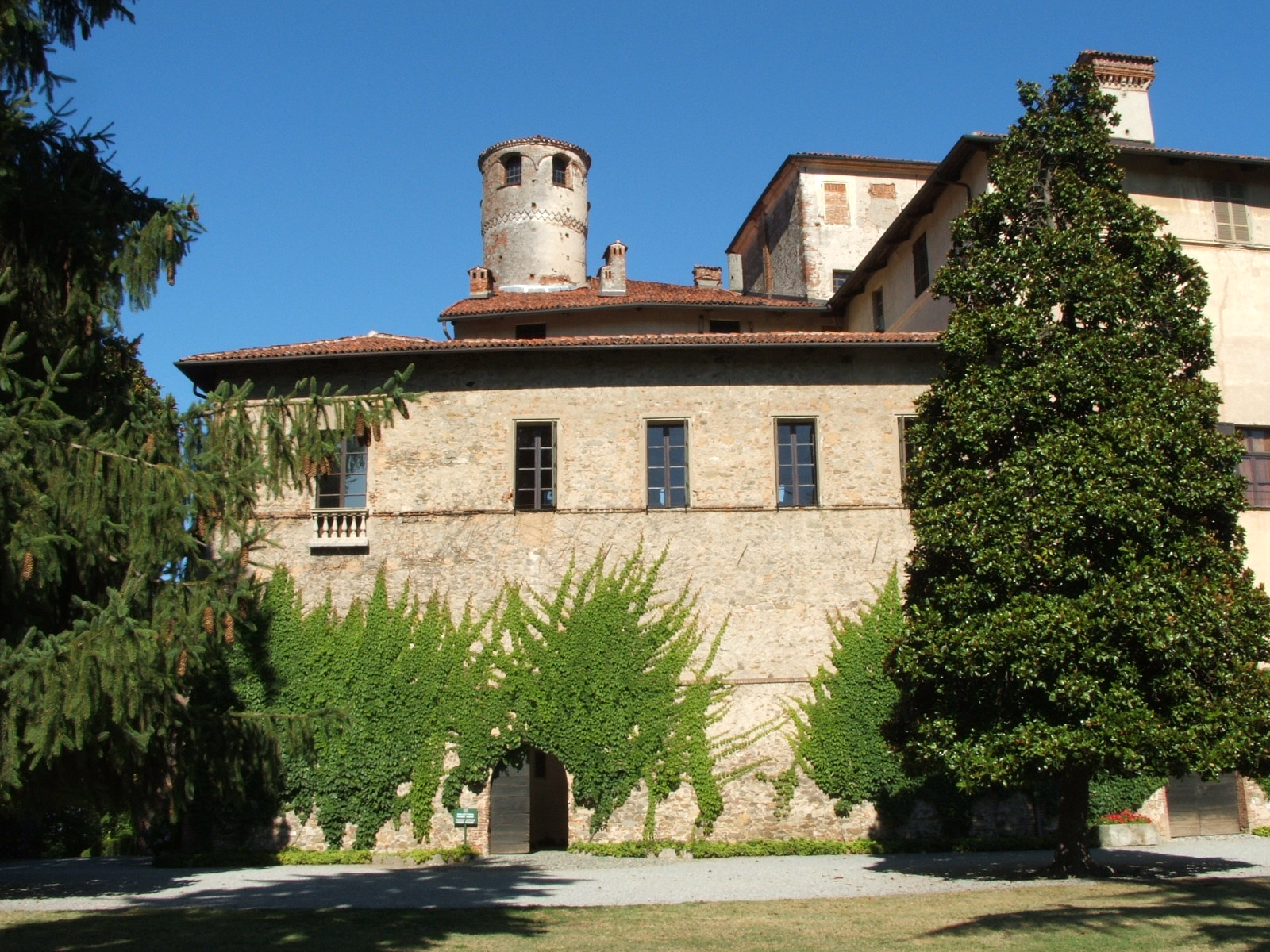
The Castello della Manta, a possession of the lords of Saluzzo.

Often torn by internal dissension, Saluzzo reached the period of greatest splendor under the rule of Ludovico I and Ludovico II in the 15th century: the former, with a policy of neutrality towards wars in Italy, was able to act as mediator between the discord and received praises from the emperor and the king of France; the latter, looking for glory on the battlefield, was repeatedly defeated, beginning the decline of the Marquisate. During his reign, however, he was attentive in developing trade by building the first Alpine tunnel, the Buco di Viso connecting with a safe road Saluzzo with the Dauphiné and Provence.

At Ludovico II's death, however, his children fought bitterly for the throne, tearing the countryside and draining finances. The King of France, who had its eye over the Marquisate, then formally annexed it to the crown of Paris after deposing the last Marquis, Gabriele in 1548.

Saluzzo became part of France for half a century, until the Savoy, with the Treaty of Lyon (1601), succeeded in taking possession of it and retaining control, with alternating phases, until the Unification of Italy.

== See also ==
- Saluzzo
- List of marquises of Saluzzo
- County of Savoy
- Duchy of Savoy
- Piedmont
- Province of Cuneo
