= Beatrix of Sicily (1260–1307) =

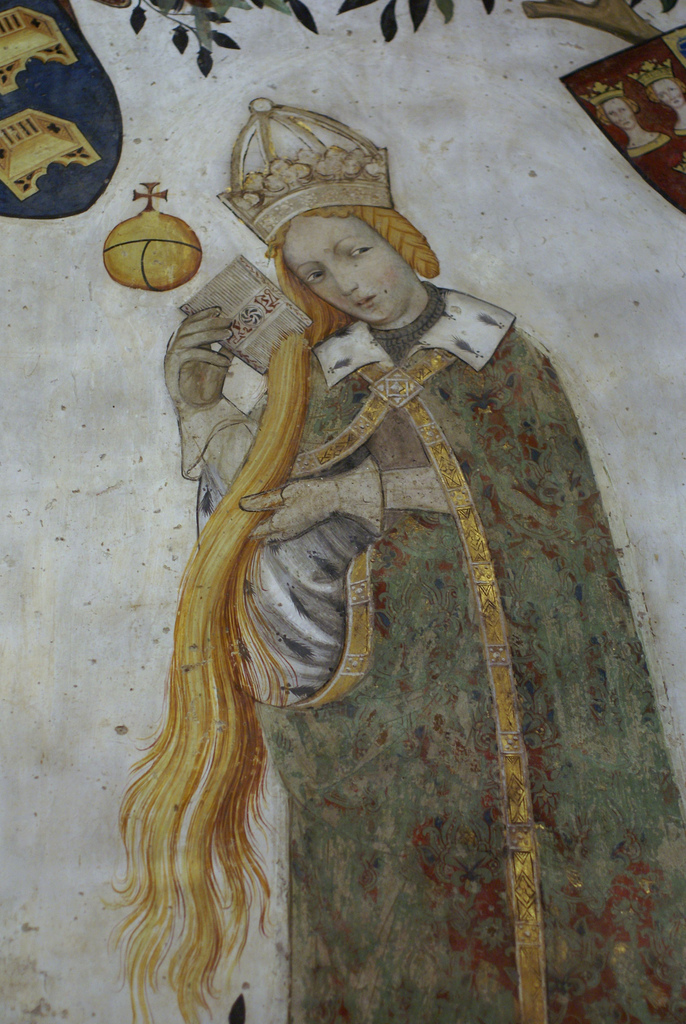
- Beatrix of Sicily, Castello della Manta
- Born: 1260; Palermo, Kingdom of Sicily
- Died: 1307 (aged 46–47); Marquisate of Saluzzo
- Spouse: Manfred IV, Marquess of Saluzzo
- Issue: Frederick I, Marquess of Saluzzo; Catherine, Lady of the Barge
- House: Hohenstaufen
- Father: Manfred, King of Sicily
- Mother: Helena Angelina Doukaina

Beatrix of Sicily or Beatrice di Sicilia (Palermo, 1260 – Marquisate of Saluzzo, 1307) was a Sicilian princess. In 1296, she became Marchioness consort of Saluzzo.

Beatrix was the daughter of Manfred of Sicily and his wife Helena Angelina Doukaina. After the battle of Benevento, on 26 February 1266, and the death of her father, Beatrix was imprisoned in Naples together with her family. After 1271, she was transferred to Naples. Beatrix regained her freedom only in 1284, after the Battle of the Gulf of Naples, thanks to Roger of Lauria.

In 1286, Beatrix married Manfred IV, son of Thomas I, Marquess of Saluzzo. In 1296, after his father-in-law's death, she became Marchioness consort of Saluzzo.

Beatrix died in 1307.

== Issue ==
Manfred and Beatrix had two children:

- Frederick I of Saluzzo.
- Catherine of Saluzzo. Married William Enganna, Lord of the Barge.

== Sources ==
- Gregorovius, Ferdinand (2010). History of the City of Rome in the Middle Ages. Cambridge University Press.
- Nicol, Donald M. (1996). The Byzantine Lady: Ten Portraits, 1250-1500. Cambridge University Press.
- Parks, Annette (2016). ""Thy Father's Valiancy Has Proved No Boon": The Fates of Helena Angelina Doukaina and her children". In Bennett, Matthew; Weikert, Katherine (eds.). Medieval Hostageship C.700-c.1500: Hostage, Captive, Prisoner of War, Guarantee, Peacemaker. Routledge.141
