= Verzuolo Castle =

Medieval castle in Piedmont, Italy

- Castello di Verzuolo
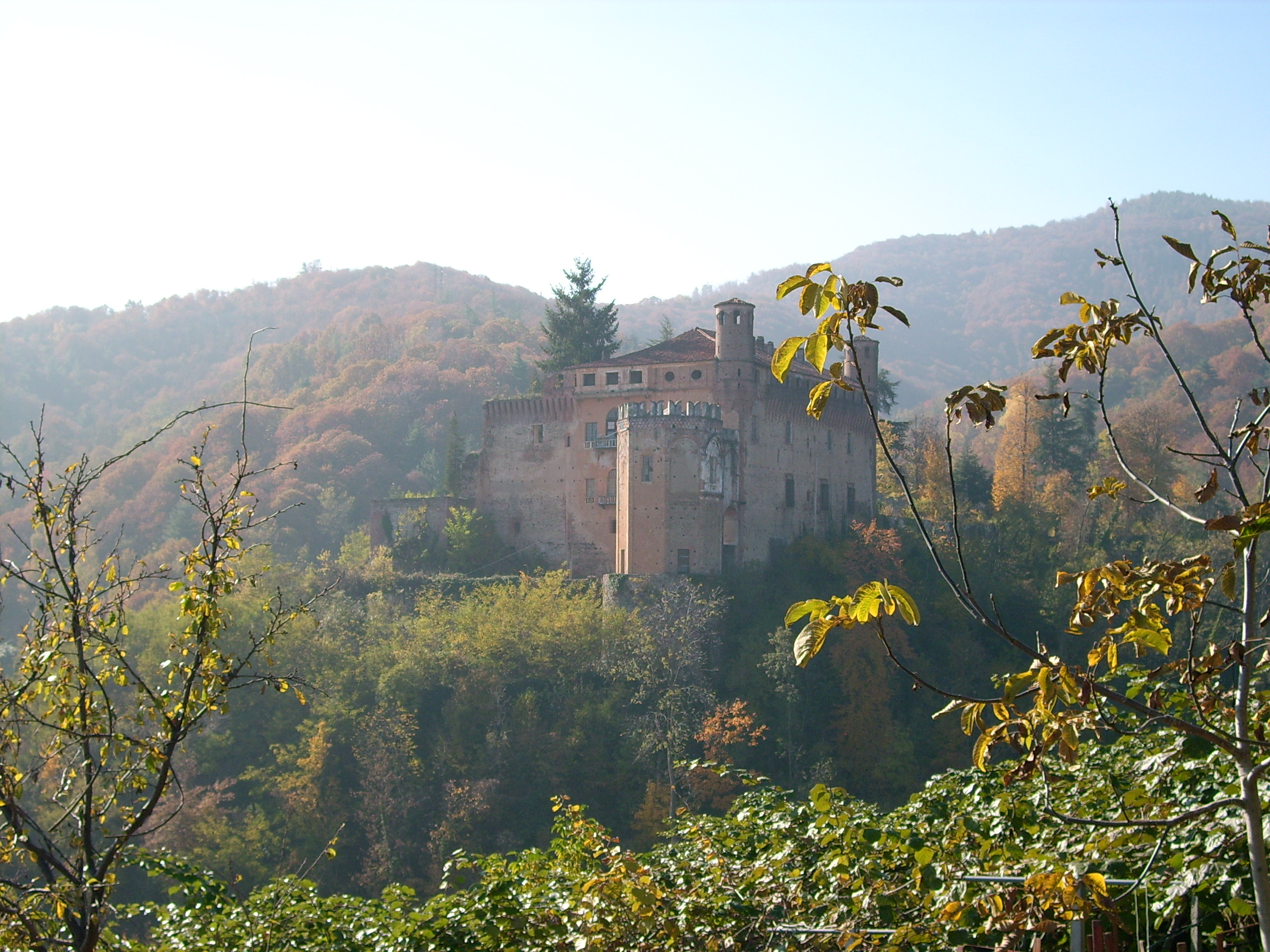
- Verzuolo Castle, 2007
- Interactive map of the Verzuolo Castle area

General information
- Location: Verzuolo, Piedmont, Italy
- Coordinates: 44.6036°N 7.4696°E
- Inaugurated: 1377
- Owner: Om.e.g Srl

Verzuolo Castle (Italian: Castello di Verzuolo) is a medieval castle in the Piedmont region of Italy. It is located in the Province of Cuneo near Verzuolo, around 3 miles (4.8 km) south of Saluzzo.

== History ==
The castle was originally built in the 11th century. In 1377, Frederick II, Marquess of Saluzzo ordered it to be demolished and rebuilt larger and more heavily fortified. His successors continued to improve it as the main fortress of the Marquisate of Saluzzo.

In 1529, Giovanni Ludovico, Marquess of Saluzzo, was imprisoned in the castle.

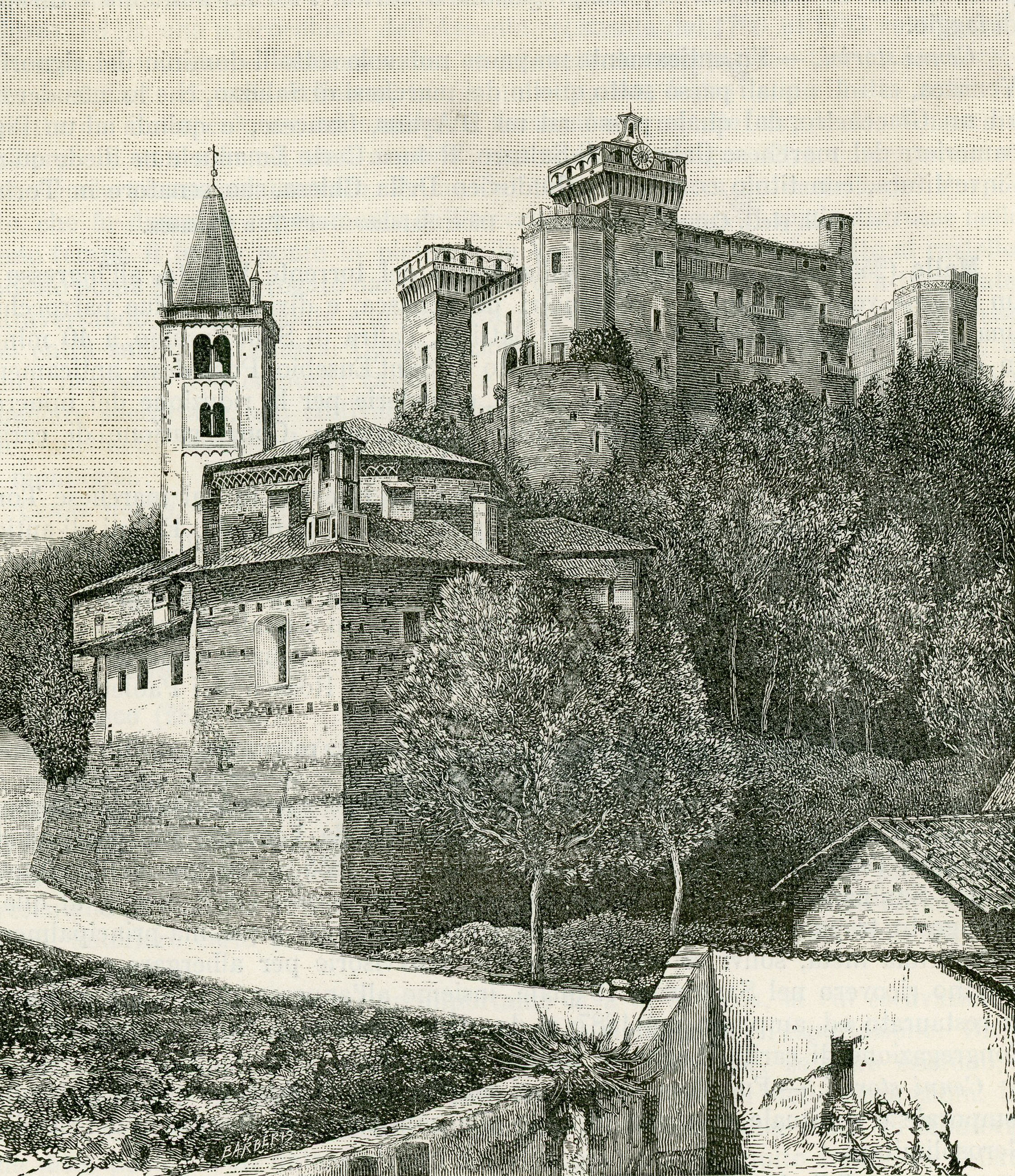
1891 woodcut

In 1600 the castle facade was renovated, changing its aspect from that of a military fortress to that of a luxury mansion, and it has since been used as a summer residence, including by Charles Emmanuel I, Duke of Savoy, and Giambattista Bodoni.

In the early 20th century the family line of the counts of Verzuolo died out, and the castle passed to Amedeo Mola di Larissé. It fell into neglect; on 18 June 1916, one of the two rectangular towers collapsed, destroying much of the castle archives, including important documents about the history of Piedmont. The remaining rectangular tower was demolished in 1938 together with the Belvedere tower.

In July 2022 the castle was sold to Om.e.g Srl, a property developer, with the intention of converting it into a hotel or other tourist facility.
