= Lagnasco =

- Comune
- Comune di Lagnasco
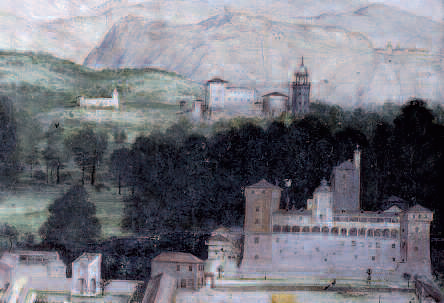

- Coat of arms

- Location within Italy Location within Piedmont
- Coordinates: 44°38′N 7°33′E
- Country: Italy
- Region: Piedmont
- Province: Cuneo (CN)

Government
  - Mayor: Roberto Dalmazzo

Area
  - Total: 17.8 km^{2} (6.9 sq mi)

Population (31 December 2007)
  - Total: 1,332
  - Density: 74.8/km^{2} (194/sq mi)
- Time zone: UTC+1 (CET)
  - Summer (DST): UTC+2 (CEST)
- Postal code: 12030
- Dialing code: 0175
- Website: Official website

Lagnasco is a comune (municipality) in the Province of Cuneo in the Italian region Piedmont, located about 50 kilometres (31 mi) south of Turin and about 30 kilometres (19 mi) north of Cuneo.

Lagnasco borders the following municipalities: Manta, Saluzzo, Savigliano, Scarnafigi, and Verzuolo.

The main attractions is the Tapparelli d'Azeglio castle, housing a series of grotesque Renaissance paintings by Piero Dolce.
