= John of Armagnac =

John of Armagnac (French: Jean d'Armagnac) may refer to:

- John I, Count of Armagnac (1311–1373)
- John II, Count of Armagnac (1333–1384)
- John III, Count of Armagnac (1359–1391)
- John IV, Count of Armagnac (1396–1450)
- John V, Count of Armagnac (1420–1473)
- Jean d'Armagnac, Duke of Nemours (1470–1503)
- Jean de Lescun d’Armagnac, died in 1473

== See also ==
- House of Armagnac
