= Federico I =

Federico I may refer to:

- Frederick I of Saluzzo (1287–1336)
- Federico I Gonzaga (1441–1484)
