= Manta, Piedmont =

Manta
- Comune
- Comune di Manta
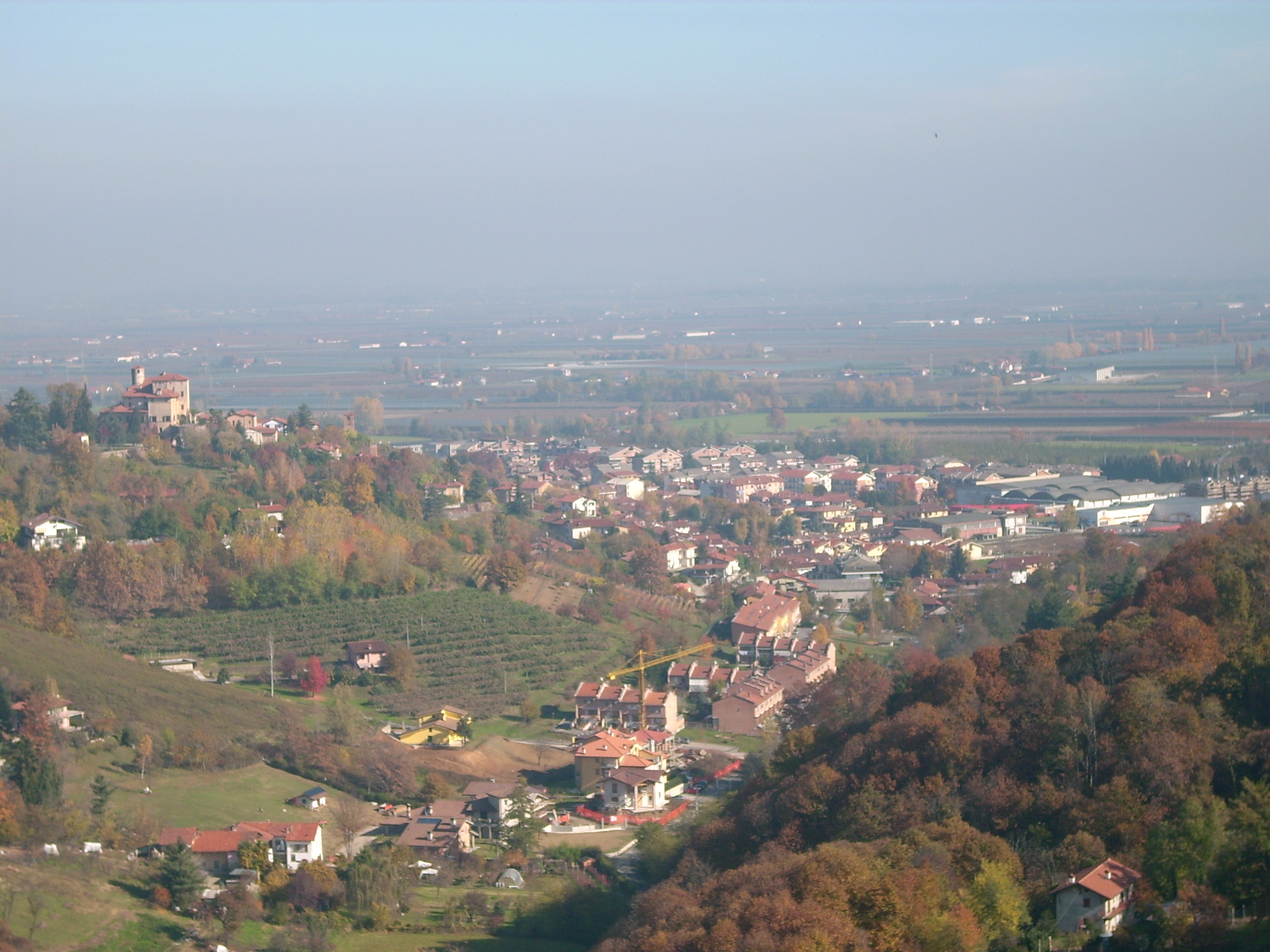

- Coat of arms

- Location within Italy Location within Piedmont
- Coordinates: 44°37′N 7°29′E
- Country: Italy
- Region: Piedmont
- Province: Cuneo (CN)
- Frazioni: Gerbola

Government
  - Mayor: Mario Guasti

Area
  - Total: 11.8 km^{2} (4.6 sq mi)

Population (31 December 2008)
  - Total: 3,573
  - Density: 303/km^{2} (784/sq mi)
- Demonym: Mantesi
- Time zone: UTC+1 (CET)
  - Summer (DST): UTC+2 (CEST)
- Postal code: 12030
- Dialing code: 0175
- Website: Official website

Manta is a comune (municipality) in the Province of Cuneo in the Italian region Piedmont, located about 50 kilometres (31 mi) southwest of Turin and about 25 kilometres (16 mi) north of Cuneo.

The main attraction is the Castello della Manta, housing a series of precious 15th-century paintings.

Manta borders the following municipalities: Lagnasco, Pagno, Saluzzo, and Verzuolo.
