= Monte Viso Tunnel =

Alpine tunnel

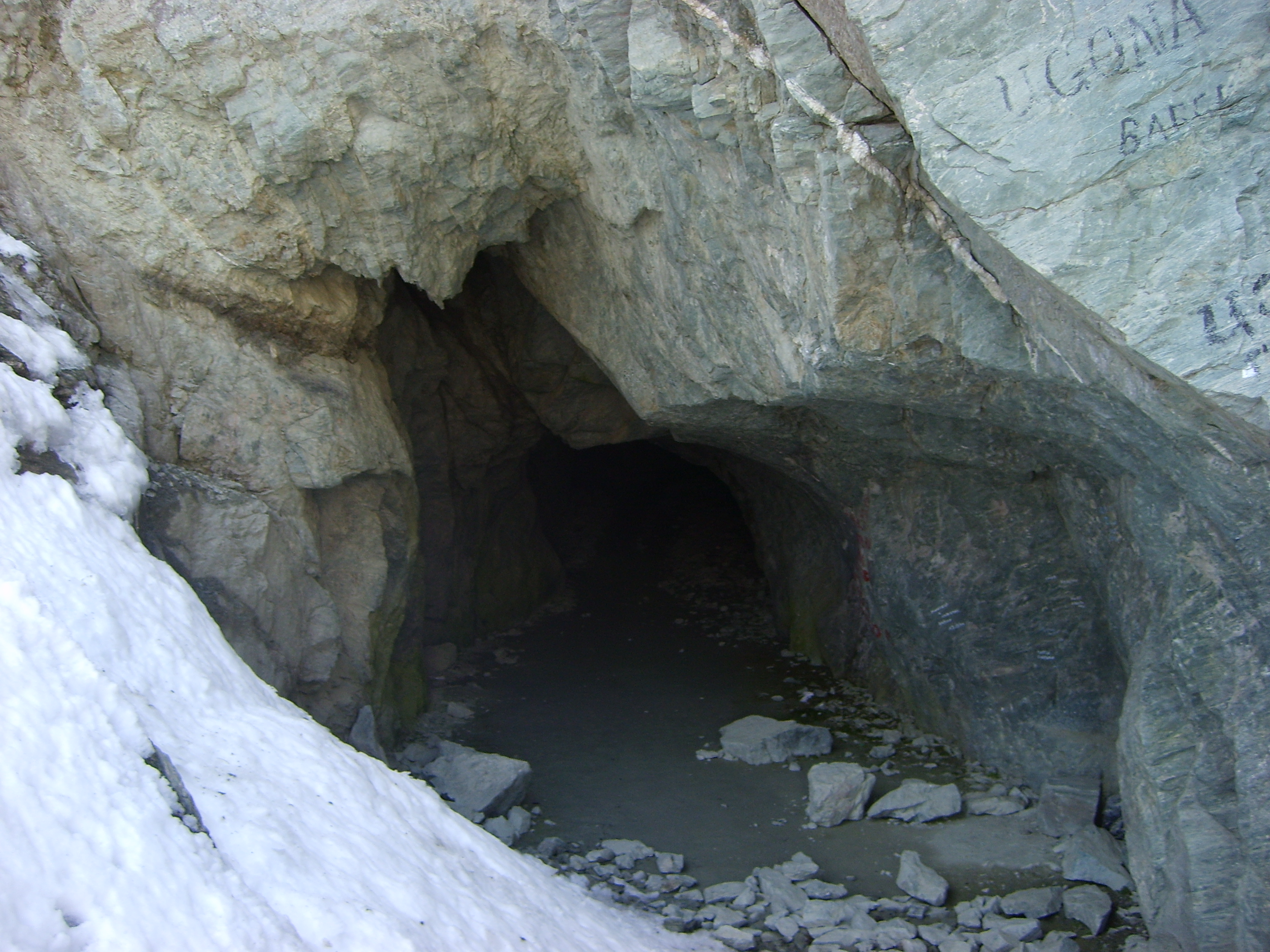
- The entrance of the tunnel by the Italian side

Overview
- Official name: Italian: Buco di Viso; French: Pertuis du Viso
- Coordinates: 44°42′43.81″N 7°03′59.18″E
- Start: Monte Granero, Piedmont

Operation
- Work began: 1479
- Opened: 1480
- Reopened: 1907, 1998, 2014

Technical
- Length: 75 m (246 ft)
- Width: 3 m (9.8 ft)

Route map

The Monte Viso Tunnel (Italian: Buco di Viso; French: Pertuis du Viso) is an Alpine pedestrian tunnel excavated in the rock during the Renaissance and located eight kilometres north of Monviso (Cottian Alps), northern Italy. It is 75 m long, 3 m wide, and located at an altitude of 2,882 metres linking the villages of Crissolo in the modern Italian province of Cuneo and Ristolas in the French department of Hautes-Alpes.

Opened in 1479, it is one of the oldest tunnels in Italy and may be one of the oldest in all of Europe.

== History ==
=== The origin of the project ===
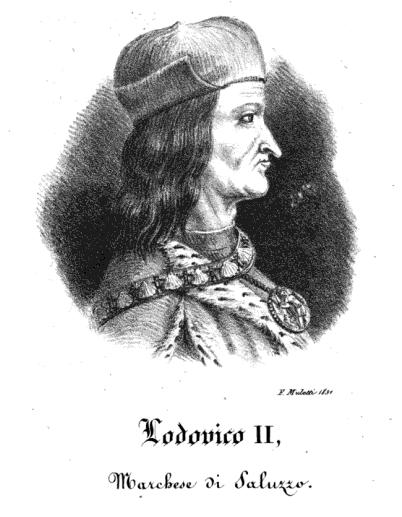
Ludovico II Del Vasto, Marquis of Saluzzo, commissioner of the work

The creation of this work was born from the decision of its promoter, Marquis of Saluzzo Ludovico II Del Vasto. With a philosophical and hostile political orientation at the House of Savoy that threatened the autonomy of his marquisate, he signed an agreement with the king of the Kingdom of Naples, René of Anjou, who was also the Count of Provence, and was therefore a vassal of the king of France Louis XI.

The purpose of the Monte Viso Tunnel was to increase trade by allowing a smooth transition to the merchant caravans that needed to cross the barrier imposed by the Alps. This created a viable alternative to the most dangerous cross country routes, whose difficult crossing caused damage to shipments. In addition, the passage through the tunnel, at a lower section of the passageway, would also increase the useful days for the passage of the goods since, as early as the snowfall, the Col de la Traversette became impracticable.

The agreement for its realization was sanctioned at Arles on September 22, 1478 and the excavation works of the tunnel began in the summer of 1479, when the snow melted. For this reason the work was interrupted in the winter and was completed at the end of the summer of 1480 under the direction of the engineers Martino di Albano and Baldassarre of Piasco, with a total cost of 12,000 florins.

=== Increased traffic ===
After the completion of the work in 1481, there was an increase in commercial traffic, and the Monte Viso Tunnel became a strategic route for the transit of goods. Exports of the marquisate included wine, rice, hemp and walnut oil. Imported from France to Saluzzo were mainly fabrics, brocade and horses, but since the little marquisate had no outlet on the sea, the tunnel gained a fundamental importance for the import of salt from Aigues-Mortes. Thus, the Monte Viso Tunnel became soon, as in many other crossings of the territory of northern Italy, a crucial element of a commercial route of extreme importance, so much so that from 1482 the Revello's gabelle recorded an annual transit of over 20,000 sacks of salt, in addition to a variety of other merchandise.

The Monte Viso Tunnel was also used for military reasons, and in 1486 it was the same Marquis Lodovico II who used the tunnel to organize his escape from Saluzzo to France. The king of France Charles VIII traveled with his army and artillery in order to make strategic moves useful to deployment in the Battle of Fornovo. In 1499 the tunnel was traversed by Louis XII, and in 1525 by his successor François I, who with his army headed to Italy to fight against the Emperor Charles V. On this occasion, the tunnel and the trail were also expanded to make them more viable to the artillery passage.

=== The decline ===
Following the Treaty of Lyon (1601), the Marquisate of Saluzzo, which had defended its independence for more than three centuries, was annexed to the Duchy of Savoy, and therefore the Monte Viso Tunnel lost its strategic importance, seeing alternating occasional openings with long periods of closure. Afterwards, Duke Carlo Emanuele I of Savoy closed the tunnel, in order not to compromise the flow of commercial traffic of the Moncenisio and Monginevro valleys, on which Savoy exercised long-term rights.

However, while neighbouring communities continued to value the tunnel for the increased trade that it enabled, it was frequently closed during the following centuries through landslides and rockfalls. Moreover, after Charles Emmanuel of Savoy conquered the Marquisate of Saluzzo, he decided to close the tunnel permanently.

=== Reopening ===
The Monte Viso Tunnel saw its first reopening on August 25, 1907 thanks to the funding of the Italian government and the contribution of the Italian Alpine Club from Turin, chaired by Ubaldo Valbusa.

In 1998 the tunnel was cleared and reopened again under the auspices of the Rotary Club of Saluzzo, who have erected information panels at both entrances. Access to the tunnel is still occasionally obstructed by rockfalls, but the route is now an established link within the network of mountain paths in the Monte Viso-Queyras-upper Po Valley district, as an alternative to crossing the summit of the Col de la Traversette.

=== Restructuring ===
After major tunnel reinforcement works, the new reopening of the tunnel was inaugurated again on October 15, 2014.

== Description ==
=== Technical characteristics ===
Located at an altitude of 2,882 metres in the east–west direction and 80 metres below the crest of Gran Grano, the tunnel originally measured about 100 metres long. It is currently about 75 metres due to erosion of the mountain sides. Chronicles of the time report that the tunnel was excavated with iron, fire, boiling water and vinegar. The track is slightly bent and sloping towards the Italian side.

The interior is almost illuminated and has an average height of 2.5 metres to within about 5 centimetres, or just enough to pass a mule loaded by two lateral sides. Transit is free and can be done easily only in the summer months, because in winter and spring the snow can block the entrances. A torch is required to travel through the gallery and a protective helmet is recommended; the air inside is saturated with humidity and the temperature is considerably lower than the outside temperature.

The entrance to the Italian slope is easier than the French one, which is more difficult as it is blocked by rock and snow shadows until late summer. The slight slope towards the Italian side favoured a frequent infill with debris carried by the thaw, but this was remedied by the recent installation of an anti-avalanche structure at the French entrance.

=== Construction technique ===
The technical difficulties of the work were remarkable. It is necessary to consider that at an altitude of 2,882 metres the snow cover is present for about eight months a year, therefore the working times were necessarily concentrated in the summer, but then violent meteorological events may occur. Explosive devices, which are now considered fundamental to the excavation of galleries, were totally unknown. Since techniques that enabled accurate topographical relief were not known, the attack on the tunnel digging was carried forward probably from only one end, reducing the speed of work. Additionally, the small cross section allowed a very limited use of manpower, with a maximum of two or three men working at the tip of the tunnel.

The constructive process used was the ancient one described by Diodorus Siculus. It consisted of stacking a pile of wood against the rocky wall and setting it on fire. The rock, burned by the flames, underwent a first process of calcination, after which it gradually cracked. The miners thereupon flooded the rock with large masses of a boiling water solution and vinegar thrown with force to disintegrate it internally. At that point, the rock became sufficiently brittle to be successfully attacked by hammers and picks that were forcefully inserted and acted in the cracks.

== Ascension to the tunnel ==
The path to the Monte Viso Tunnel starts at Pian del Re, where the river Po is born, at about 2,020 metres of altitude, taking the "V16" path leading to cross country crossing. The climb is not negligible but slopes are quite steep and in total hiking lasts on average between two and three hours per track. A little further downstream of the Italian entrance to the tunnel, in a detritic zone called Pian Mait at approximately 2,700 metres of altitude, there are the remains of a small barracks of the Border Guard.

The overall difficulty of the route is evaluated in "E" (easy hiking) by Parodi.

== Safety ==
The tunnel is about 75 metres long and about 3 metres wide, but the ceiling in certain sections is only 1.70 metres high and at one point just 1.40 metres, so walkers need a torch and the use of a helmet is recommended. People carrying a large rucksack may find it a bit of a squeeze. Entering the tunnel at the French end necessitates climbing down some fallen rocks to reach the floor of the tunnel. Additionally, the French entrance is usually blocked by snow until well into the summer season.

== See also ==
- Monviso
