= Tommaso II =

Tommaso II may refer to:

- Thomas II of Piedmont (c. 1199–1259), Count of Piedmont from 1233 to his death
- Thomas II of Saluzzo (died 1357)
