= Manfred I of Saluzzo =

Marquess of Saluzzo from 1142 until 1175

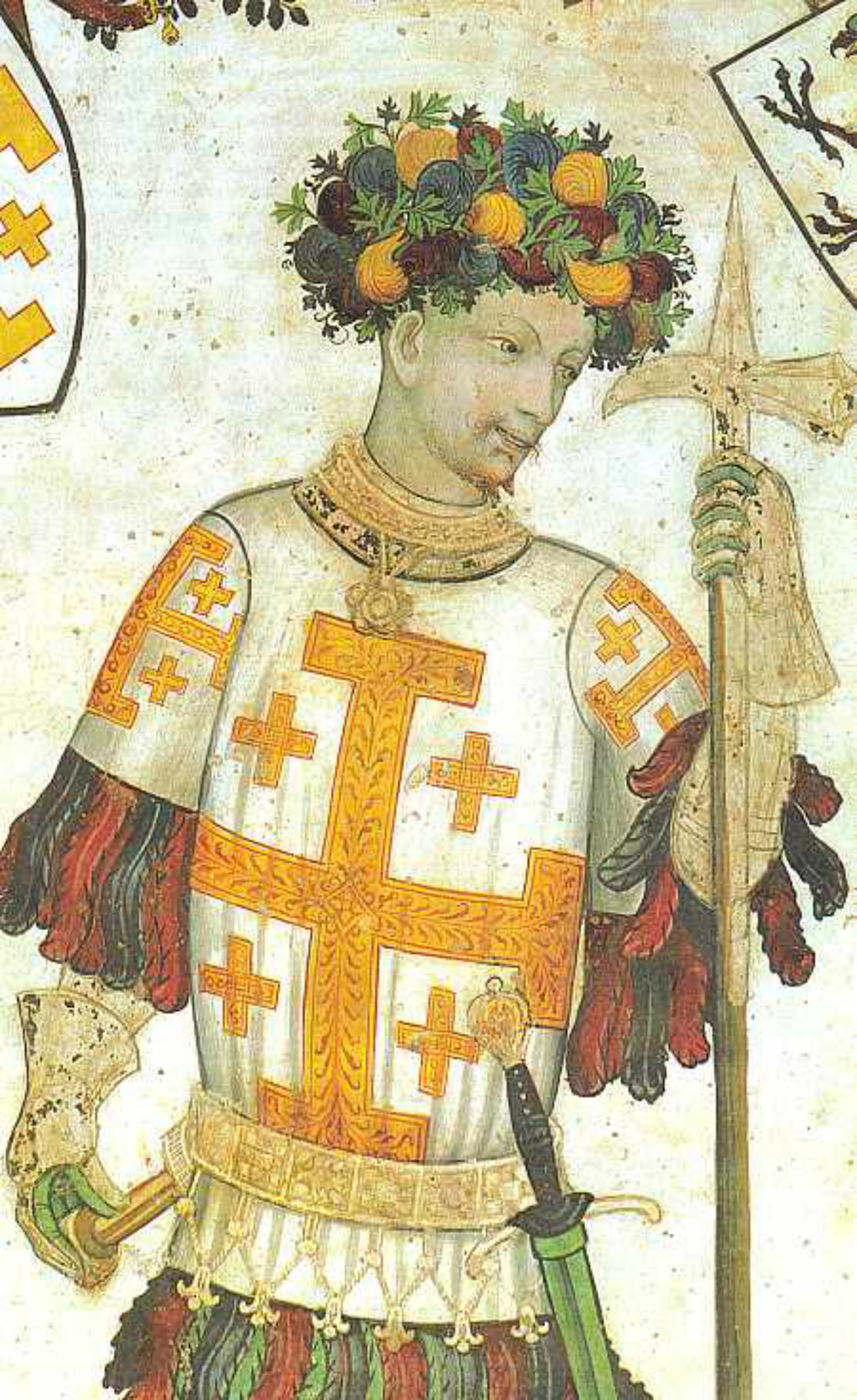
Fresco by Giacomo Jaquerio in the Castello della Manta (1420), meant to represent both Manfred I and Godfrey of Bouillon as one of the Nine Worthies

Manfred I (died 1175) was the founder and first ruler of the marquisate of Saluzzo from 1142 until his death.

Manfred was the eldest of seven sons of Bonifacio del Vasto, the ruler of scattered holdings between Savona and the Tanaro, (Note: Boniface received the county of Saluzzo in feudum directly from its suzerain, Ulric Manfred, margrave of Turin, and gave it to his son.) and Agnes of Vermandois. He is first recorded in a document of 1123. After Bonifacio's death in 1125, his lands were ruled jointly by the brothers, but in 1142, they divided them up. Manfred took most of the lands between the Alps, the Po and the Stura. His new lordship was larger than his brother's and better positioned to become a true principality. It only came to be known as the marquisate of Saluzzo after his death. In his own life, he used the title of marquis without a territorial designation, or else "marquis of Vasto" (Latin marchio de Vasto). He made his the strategically important castle of Saluzzo in the centre of his domain his seat.

In 1127, Manfred founded the monastery of Staffarda. He was an ally of the Emperor Frederick Barbarossa, recognizing him as his suzerain and trying to maintain peace between him and the Lombard cities. Four diploma attest to his periodic attendance at Barbarossa's court at Milan (1161), Turin (1162) and Rimini (1167).

Manfred married Eleonora, the daughter of Judge Gonario II of Arborea. He was succeeded by his son Manfred II.

== Sources ==
- Previté-Orton, C.W. (1912). The Early History of the House of Savoy (1000–1233). Cambridge at the University Press.

Preceded by none	Marquess of Saluzzo; 1125–1175	Succeeded by Manfred II
