= Thomas I of Saluzzo =

Marquess of Saluzzo (1239–1296)

Thomas I
- Marchese di Saluzzo
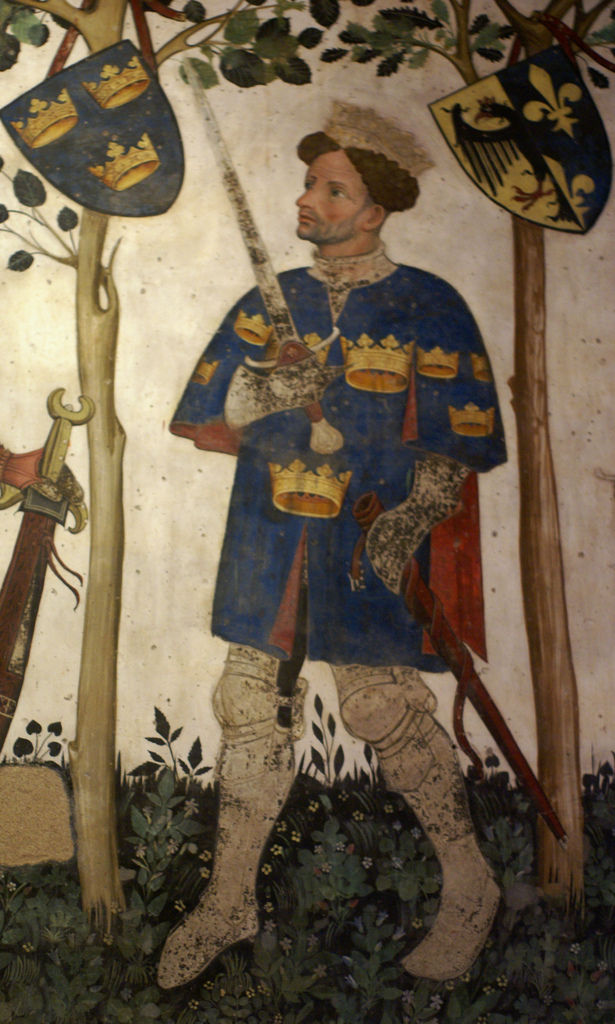
- Reign: 1244–1296
- Predecessor: Manfredo III
- Successor: Manfredo IV
- Born: 1239
- Died: 1296 (aged 56–57)
- Noble family: House of Aleramici
- Spouse: Luigia di Ceva
- Issue: Manfredo IV; Alice FitzAlan, Countess of Arundel; Violante of Saluzzo
- Father: Manfredo III
- Mother: Beatrice of Savoy

Thomas I (1239–1296) was the fourth Marquess of Saluzzo from 1244 to his death. He was the son of Manfred III and Beatrice of Savoy. He succeeded his father Manfred III. He was also the grandson of Amadeus IV, Count of Savoy.

== Biography ==
Under the reign of Thomas, Saluzzo blossomed, achieving a greatness which had eluded his ancestors. He crafted a state the borders of which remained unchanged for over two centuries. He extended the march to include Carmagnola. He was often at odds with Asti and he was a prime enemy of Charles of Anjou and his Italian pretensions. During his tenure, he made Saluzzo a free city, giving it a podestà to govern in his name. He defended his castles and roccaforti (strongholds) vigorously and built many new ones in the cities.

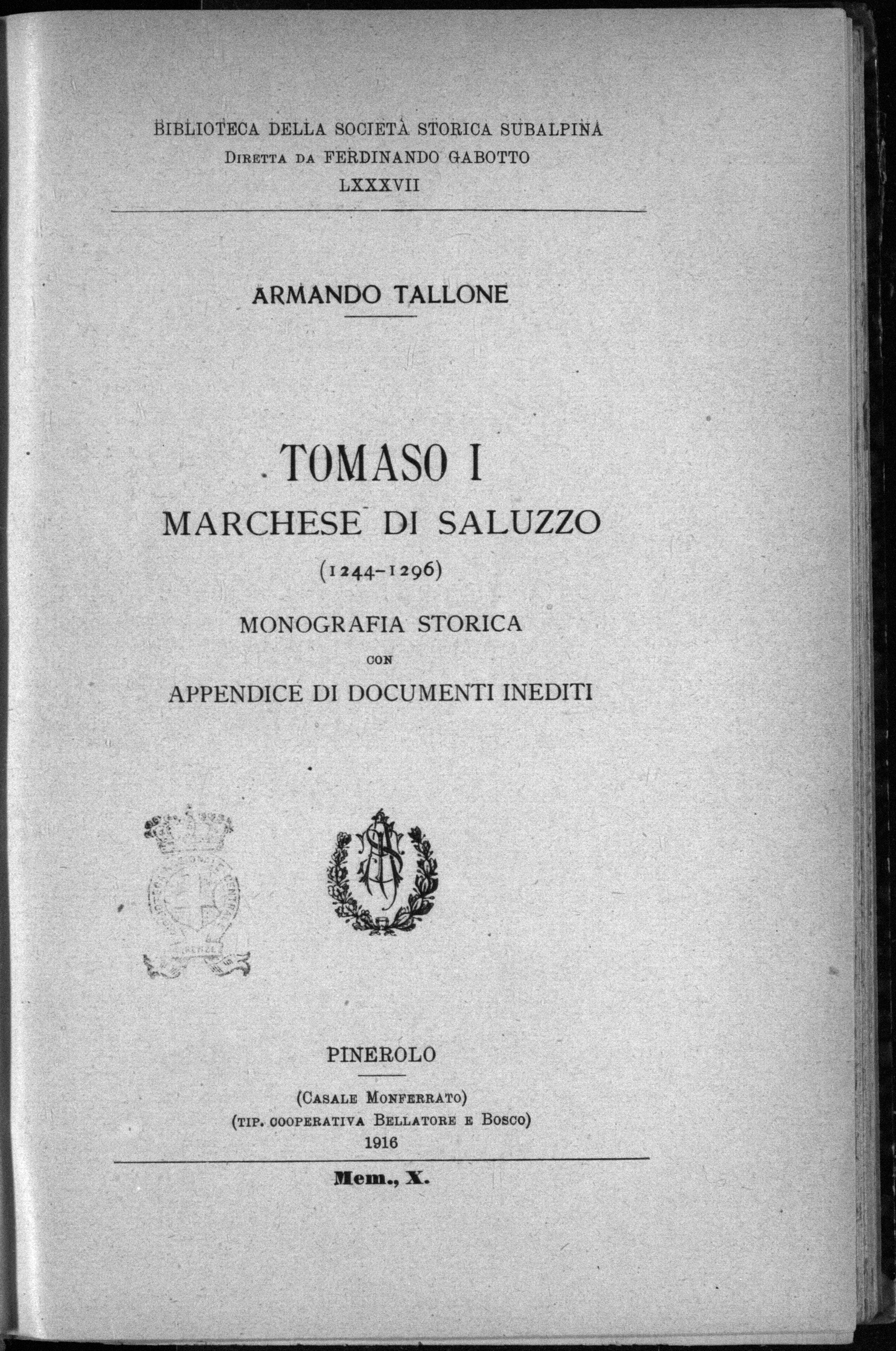
Armando Tallone, Tomaso I Marchese di Saluzzo, 1916

== Marriage and issue ==
He married Luigia of Ceva. They had:

- Manfred IV, succeeded his father
- Violante of Saluzzo
- Alice of Saluzzo, who married Richard Fitzalan, 8th Earl of Arundel

== Sources ==
- Chaubet, Daniel (1984). "Une enquête historique en Savoie au XVe siècle". Journal des savants (in French). 1–2: 93–125. doi:10.3406/jds.1984.1477.
- Coke, Karen (2016). "Lambert Barnard, Bishop Shirborn's 'Paynter'". In Dimmock, Matthew; Hadfield, Andrew; Quinn, Paul (eds.). Art, Literature and Religion in Early Modern Sussex. Routledge.

Thomas I of Saluzzo Aleramici Born: 1239 Died: 1296
Preceded by Manfred III	Marquess of Saluzzo; 1244–1296	Succeeded by Manfred IV
