= Helena Angelina Doukaina =

Queen consort of Sicily
- Tenure: 2 June 1259 – 26 February 1266
- Born: c. 1242
- Died: 1271 (aged 28–29)
- Spouse: Manfred of Sicily
- Issue: Beatrice, Marchioness of Saluzzo; Frederick of Sicily; Henry of Sicily; Anselm/Enzio of Sicily
- House: Komnenodoukai
- Father: Michael II Komnenos Doukas
- Mother: Theodora Petraliphaina

Helena Angelina Doukaina (c. 1242 – 1271) was Queen of Sicily as the second wife of King Manfred. Queen Helena was the daughter of Michael II Komnenos Doukas, Despot of Epirus, and Theodora Petraliphaina. Her marriage was an expression of the alliance of her father and the ruler of Sicily against the growing power of the Empire of Nicaea.

== Marriage ==
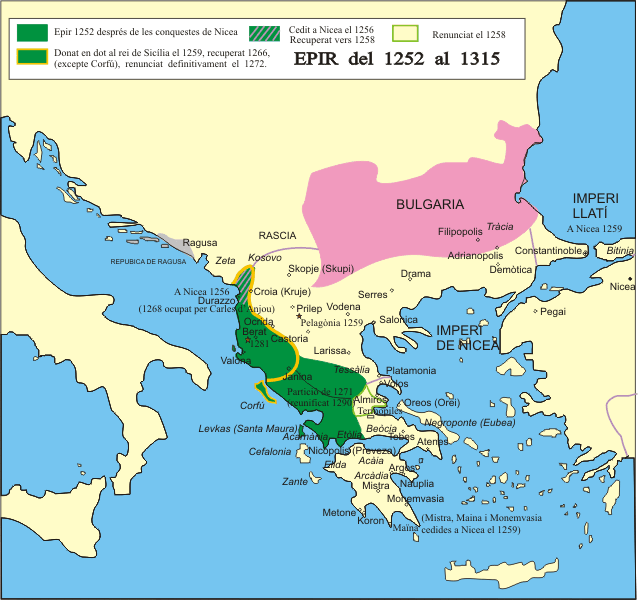
Queen Helena's dowry

She was married to Manfred of Sicily 2 June 1259, after the death of his first wife Beatrice of Savoy in 1257 and his own rise to the throne on 10 August 1258. D. J. Geanakoplos notes that this marriage was surprising, considering Manfred's father Frederick II had been in an alliance with John III Vatatzes, the late ruler of the Empire of Nicaea, but "one must consider that conquest of the Byzantine Empire had been a traditional Norman aim for almost a century, and that Manfred was now in a strong enough position in Italy to discard his father's alliance and to look to those who could assist him in his ambitions for Balkan domination." Few details of how this marriage was arranged have come down to us. "It would be of interest," Geanakoplos observes, "to know who took the initiative to promote the marriage alliance; whether Manfred's marriage preceded that of William of Achaea to Anna, another daughter of Michael II; and, most important, whether Manfred's Epirote possessions were secured from Michael II actually as a result of conquest or as a dowry."

Manfred had captured Dyrrhachium and its surrounding area within the following two years. Michael II still had a territorial claim at the city but at the time was preparing to besiege Thessalonica. Helena's dowry included all rights to Dyrrhachium and its surrounding area along with the island of Corfu. Corfu was the only clear territorial gain for Manfred.

== Imprisonment ==
Manfred was killed at the Battle of Benevento on 26 February 1266 while fighting against his rival and successor Charles I of Sicily. Charles captured Helena and imprisoned her in the castle of Nocera Inferiore where she died in 1271, five years later.

== Issue ==
Helena and Manfred had four children:

- Beatrix of Sicily (c. 1260 – before 1307); imprisoned in Castel del Monte until released, later married Manfred IV of Saluzzo.
- Frederick of Sicily (c. 1259 – last mentioned alive in 1312), first imprisoned in Castel del Monte, and from 1299 onwards in Castel dell'Ovo. He escaped prison and fled to Germany, spending time in several European courts before he died in Egypt.
- Henry of Sicily (May 1262 – 31 October 1318), first imprisoned in Castel del Monte, and from 1299 onwards in Castel dell'Ovo. He was the last member of the Hohenstaufen dynasty.
- Enzio (Azzolino) of Sicily (c. 1261 – c. 1301), first imprisoned in Castel del Monte, and from 1299 onwards in Castel dell'Ovo.

Royal titles
Preceded by Elisabeth of Bavaria	Queen consort of Sicily; 2 June 1259 – 26 February 1266	Succeeded by Beatrice of Provence
