= Alessandra Boarelli =

Italian mountaineer

- Born: 1838; Turin, Kingdom of Sardinia
- Died: 1908 (aged 69–70); Verzuolo, Italy
- Occupation: Mountaineer
- Known for: First woman to summit Monviso
- Spouse: Emilio-Giovanni Boarelli
- Children: Isabella, Luisa, Clemente-Maria

Alessandra Boarelli (Turin, 1838 – Verzuolo, 1908) was an Italian mountaineer and, in 1864, became the first woman to summit Monviso in the Alps.

== Biography ==
She was born in Turin, Italy, the daughter of Felice Re. After marrying Emilio-Giovanni Boarelli, a man from a noble family, as well as mayor of Cuneo, she moved to nearby Verzuolo where the couple had three daughters, Isabella, Luisa and Clemente-Maria (born 1870).

The family lived close to the French border in western Italy, located in the Italian region of Piedmont. The area is dominated by Monte Viso (commonly shortened by Italians to Monviso), the highest mountain of the Cottian Alps, the southwestern portion of the Alps.

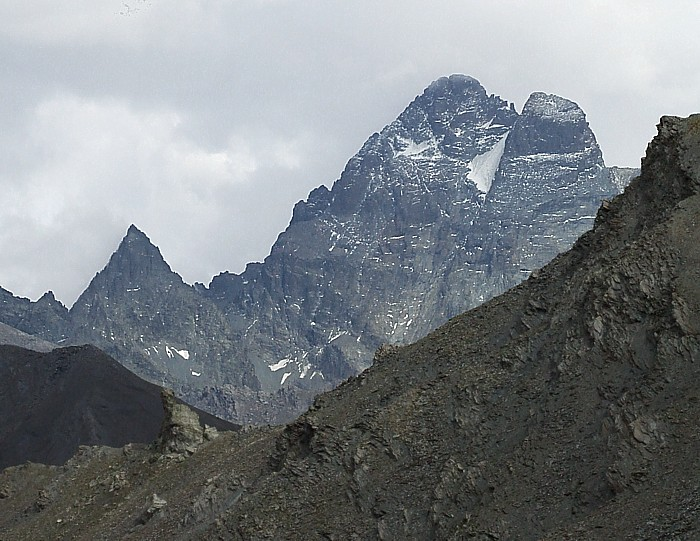
Monviso (3,841 m.) seen from the Col de Chamoussiere.

Boarelli first attempted to climb Monviso in 1863, hoping to beat a similar attempt by a team headed by Quintino Sella by a few days, but she had to turn back because of bad weather. The Sella-led team then succeeded in their climb becoming the third team, and the first Italians, to reach the summit. This was two years after the first successful ascent was made by a group of mountaineers led by William Mathews from England.

When Boarelli tried again the following year, she became the first woman to reach the Monviso peak 3,841 metres (12,602 ft) on 16 August 1864. Accompanying her on the expedition were: the fourteen-year-old daughter of a Casteldelfino notary, Cecilia Filia, the parish priest of Casteldelfino, Don Carlo Galliano, and two other climbers.

== Dedications ==
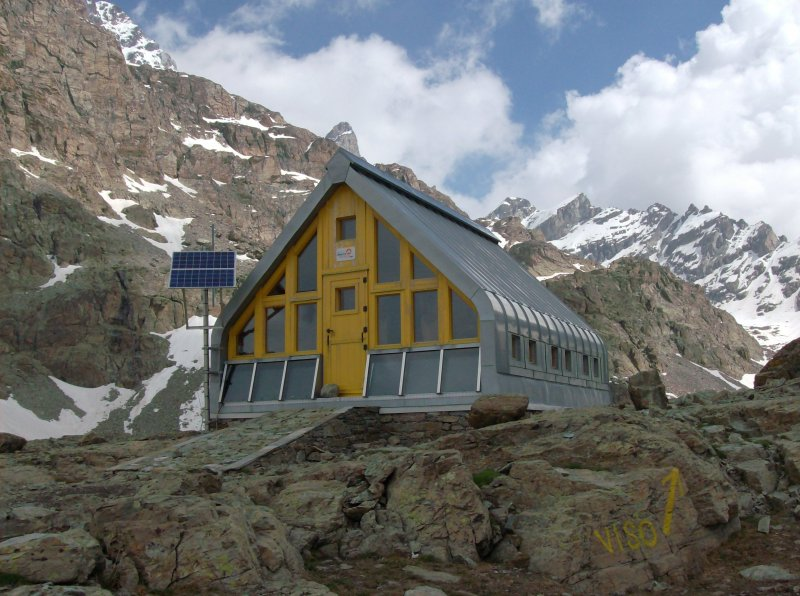
Bivouac Boarelli is located on the south slope of Montviso and dedicated to Alessandra Boarelli in 2005.

- A bivouac was dedicated to Boarelli in 2005. It is located at the foot of the southern slope of Monviso, near the Forciolline lakes, at an altitude of about 2,820 metres (9,250 ft). It's on the access road to Monviso from Castello di Pontechianale.
- In Verzuolo, where Boarelli lived, her accomplishment was remembered with an exhibition titled, "The woman and the mountain 1860-1960." It was placed in the town's Palazzo Drago and displayed mementos and photographs of the climber as well as other female mountaineers.

== External sources ==
- Cottino, Linda. Nina. Devi tornare sul Viso. Storia di Alessandra Boarelli, la prima sul Monviso. (in Italian) Italy, Fusta, 2019.
