= Manfred IV of Saluzzo =

Italian noble

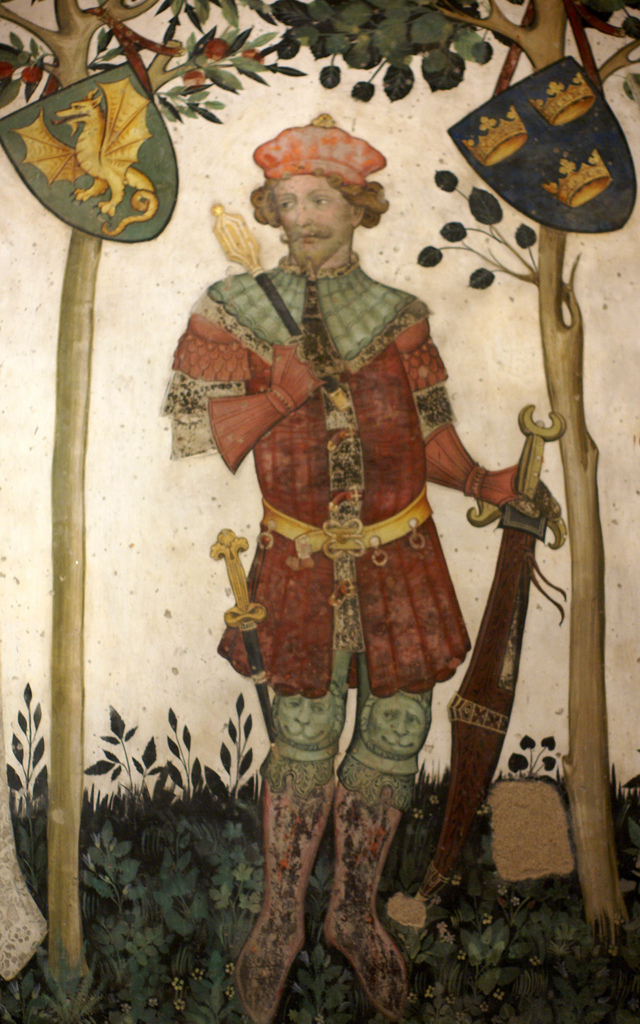
Manfred IV of Saluzzo

Manfred IV (died 1330) was the fifth marquess of Saluzzo from 1296, the son of Thomas I and Luisa of Ceva.

== Biography ==
Manfred forced the commune of Saluzzo (granted it by his father) to sign a contract regulating the relations between the city, its podestà, and the marquess.

Manfred also continued his father's extension of the margravial territory, mostly through annexations of land and castles. On 27 August 1305, Manfred paid fealty to Amadeus V of Savoy for the Marquisate of Saluzzo. In 1322, in return for reorganising the debts of the Del Carretto family, he obtained the castles of Cairo Montenotte, Rocchetta (Note: There are several places called Rocchetta. Some of them, particularly those in the modern provinces of Alessandria and Asti, are close to the two other castles which Manfred acquired. It is unclear which Rocchetta this was.) and Cortemilia.

By his first marriage, to Beatrix of Sicily, daughter of Manfred of Sicily and Helena Angelina Doukaina, Manfred had one son, Frederick. However, he fell under the influence of his second wife, Isabella Doria, by whom he had three children (Manfred, Theodore and Boniface), and tried to appoint his second-eldest son Manfred to the succession. This precipitated a civil war after his death in 1330 that lasted until 29 July 1332, when the throne was ceded to Frederick.

== Marriages and children ==
Manfred IV married, firstly, Beatrix of Sicily, daughter of Manfred of Sicily and Helena Angelina Doukaina. They had two children:

- Frederick I of Saluzzo
- Caterina of Saluzzo. Married William Enganna, Lord of the Barge

He married, secondly, Isabella Doria, daughter of Bernabo Doria and Eleonora Fieschi. Her parents were patricians of the Republic of Genoa. They had four children:

- Manfred V of Saluzzo
- Boniface of Saluzzo
- Theodore of Saluzzo
- Eleonora of Saluzzo. Married Oddone I, Marquess of Ceva

He also had an illegitimate daughter, Elinda of Saluzzo.

== Sources ==
- Chaubet, Daniel (1984). "Une enquête historique en Savoie au XVe siècle". Journal des savants (in French). 1–2: 93–125. doi:10.3406/jds.1984.1477.
- Cox, Eugene L. (1967). The Green Count of Savoy: Amedeus VI and the Transalpine Savoy in the Fourteenth Century. Princeton University Press.

Preceded by Thomas I	Marquess of Saluzzo; 1296–1330	Succeeded by Manfred V
Preceded by Thomas I	Marquess of Saluzzo; 1296–1330	Succeeded by Frederick I
