= Thomas III of Saluzzo =

Marquess of Saluzzo from 1396 to 1416

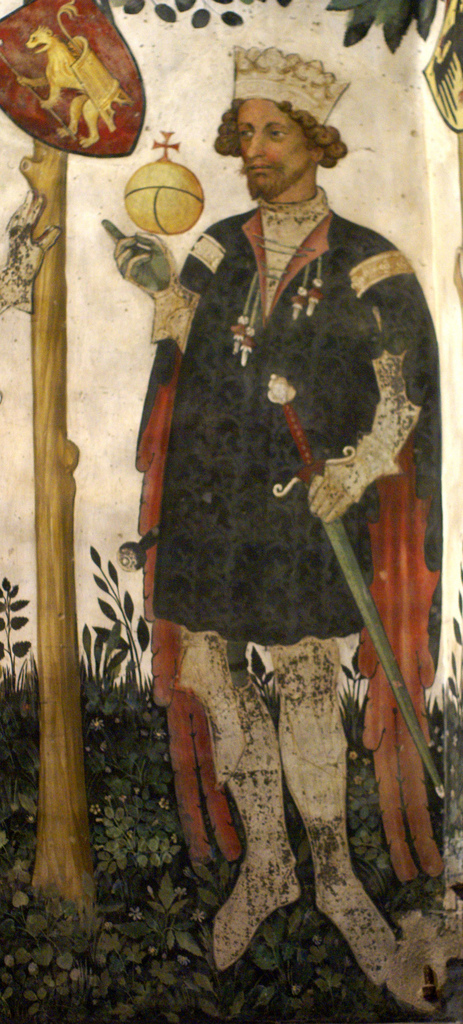
Thomas III marquess of Saluzzo.

Thomas III of Saluzzo (Italian: Tommaso III di Saluzzo) (1356–1416) was Marquess of Saluzzo from 1396 until his death.

== Life and career ==
He was born in Saluzzo in north-western Italy to Frederick II del Vasto and Beatrice of Geneva. His maternal grandfather was Hugh of Geneva, Lord of Gex, Anthon and Varey.

He tried to continue the philo-French politics of his father, mainly to face the menace of Duke Amadeus VIII of Savoy, who aimed to conquer the whole Piedmont. In fact, the treaty stating the nominal submission to France was signed by Thomas well before his father's death.

The vassalage to French was also a consequence of the education received by Thomas, who lived in Provence for much of his youth, and travelled there in 1375, 1389, 1401, 1403 and 1405. He was married to the French Marguerite of Roussy.

In 1394 he was captured by Savoyard troops while he was leading a ravage in Monasterolo. Imprisoned first in Savigliano and then in Turin, he was freed only two years later after a ransom of 20,000 golden florins had been paid.

In his late years Thomas assigned the succession to his young son Ludovico, under the regency of his brother Valerano and the marchioness Marguerite.

== Culture ==
A man of great culture, Thomas was the author of one of the most important chivalric texts of the Middle Ages, Le Chevalier Errant, written probably during his imprisonment in Piedmont. The text, written in French, is an allegory of the ideals of knighthood. It inspired the famous frescoes in the Castello della Manta.

== Marriage and children ==
He married Marguerite of Pierrepont. She was a daughter of Hugo II, Count of Roucy and Braine. They had five children:

- Carlo Giovanni of Saluzzo (1404–1406).
- Giovanna of Saluzzo (born 1405, date of death unknown). Married Guigues IV, Lord of Meollet and Offremont.
- Ludovico I of Saluzzo, married to Isabella Palaiologina, daughter of John Jacob, Marquess of Montferrat.
- Beatrice of Saluzzo. A nun.
- Ricciardia of Saluzzo. Married Niccolò III d'Este.

He also had at least three children with his mistress, Olmeta de Soglio:

- Valerano of Saluzzo (died 1443).
- Lanzarotto of Saluzzo.
- Giovanna, Abbess of Santa Maria di Staffarda.

The existence of illegitimate daughter Elena of Saluzzo is disputed.

Preceded by Frederick II	Marquess of Saluzzo; 1396–1416	Succeeded by Ludovico I
