= Elvira Petrozzi =

Italian Roman Catholic nun (1937–2023)

- Born: Rita Agnese Petrozzi; 21 January 1937; Sora, Italy
- Died: 3 August 2023 (aged 86); Saluzzo, Italy
- Occupation: Nun

Elvira Petrozzi (born Rita Agnese Petrozzi; 21 January 1937 – 3 August 2023) was an Italian Roman Catholic nun. A member of the Sisters of Divine Charity, she was known as "the sister of drug addicts" and the founder of the Communità Cenacolo, which specialised in helping drug addicts.

== Biography ==
Born in Sora on 21 January 1937 to an alcoholic father, Petrozzi and her family fled to Alessandria during World War II. She claimed to have "never thought of learning to read or study". In 1956, at the age of 19, she joined the Sisters of Divine Charity in addition to working as a caregiver at a children’s daycare.

On 16 July 1983, Petrozzi founded the Comunità Cenacolo in an 18th-century house in Saluzzo. She first intended to create a community for marginalized young people, but turned to helping young drug addicts, eventually devoting herself to the latter. On 16 July 2009, the community was recognized by the Pontifical Council for the Laity as a private international association of the faithful.

By 2013, there were sixty Cenacolo communities, with a presence in Croatia, Bosnia and Herzegovina, Slovenia, Austria, Poland, Russia, Ireland, France, the United States, Mexico, the Dominican Republic, and Brazil.

Elvira Petrozzi died in Saluzzo on 3 August 2023, at the age of 86.

== See also ==
- Padre Léo
