= Verzuolo =

- Comune
- Comune di Verzuolo
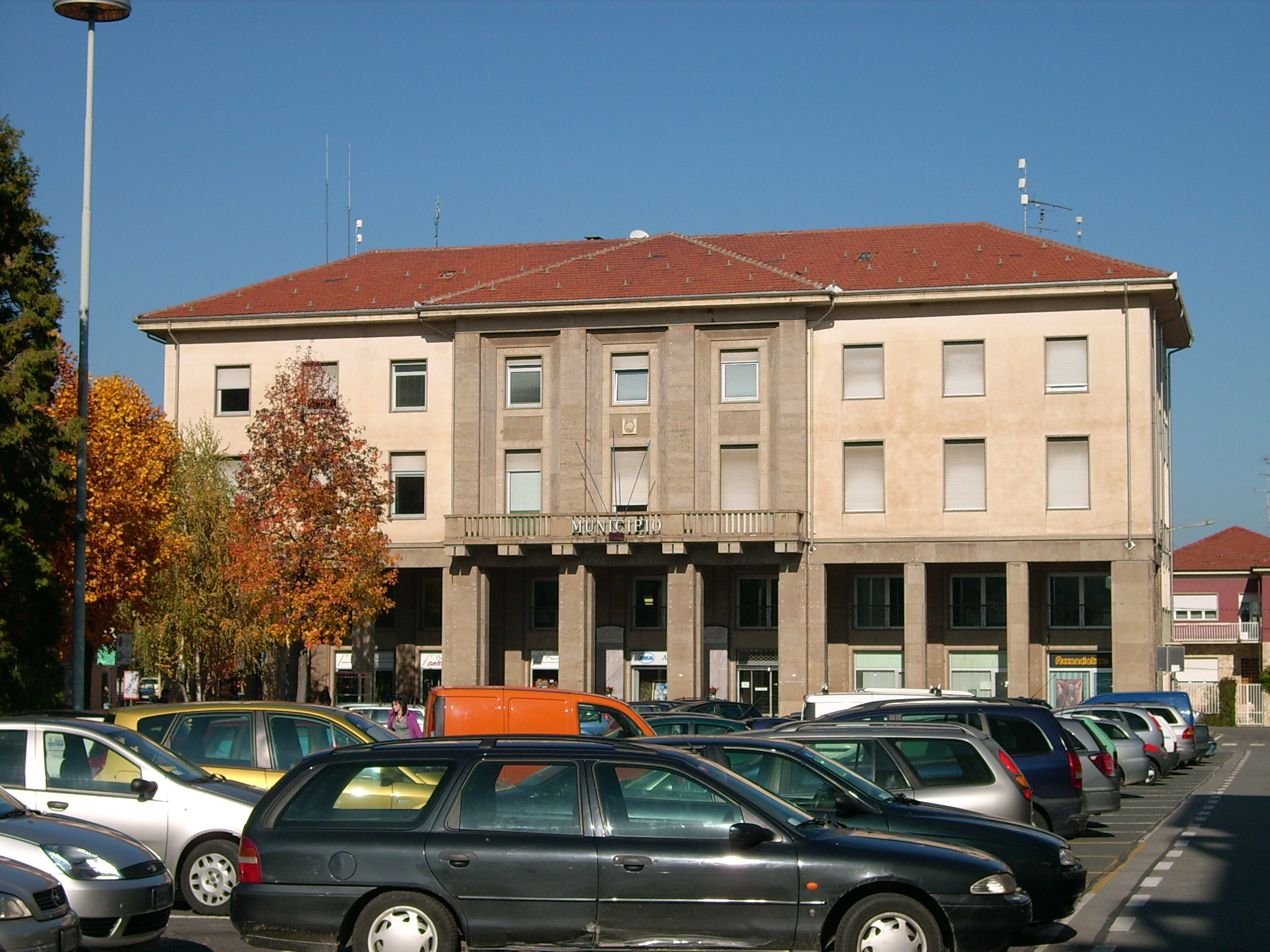
- Town hall

- Coat of arms

- Location within Italy Location within Piedmont
- Coordinates: 44°36′N 7°29′E
- Country: Italy
- Region: Piedmont
- Province: Province of Cuneo (CN)
- Frazioni: Falicetto, Villanovetta, Papò, Chiamina, S. Bernardo, Pomerolo

Area
  - Total: 26.2 km^{2} (10.1 sq mi)
- Elevation: 420 m (1,380 ft)

Population (Dec. 2004)
  - Total: 6,379
  - Density: 243/km^{2} (631/sq mi)
- Demonym: Verzuolesi
- Time zone: UTC+1 (CET)
  - Summer (DST): UTC+2 (CEST)
- Postal code: 12039
- Dialing code: 0175
- Website: Official website

Verzuolo is a comune (municipality) in the Province of Cuneo in the Italian region Piedmont, located about 66 kilometres (41 mi) southwest of Turin and about 25 kilometres (16 mi) north of Cuneo. As of 31 December 2004, it had a population of 6,379 and an area of 26.2 square kilometres (10.1 mi^{2}).

The municipality of Verzuolo contains the frazioni (subdivisions, mainly villages and hamlets) Falicetto, Villanovetta, Papò, Chiamina, S. Bernardo, and Pomerolo.

Verzuolo borders the following municipalities: Costigliole Saluzzo, Lagnasco, Manta, Pagno, Piasco, Savigliano, Villafalletto.

== Notable people ==
People born in Verzuolo, or with close links to it, have included:

- Giuseppe Siccardi (Verzuolo, 3 October 1802 – Turin, 29 October 1857) was an Italian jurist and politician.
- Alessandra Boarelli (Turin, 1838 – Verzuolo, 1908) was an Italian mountaineer and, in 1864, became the first woman to summit Monviso.
- Cesare Billia (Verzuolo, 1863 – Libya, 14 June 1915) was an Italian soldier, 63rd Infantry Regiment officer and recipient of a gold medal and a silver medal for military valor.
- Giovanni Vincenzo Cima (Verzuolo, 22 July 1893 – Turin, 5 July 1968) was an Italian journalist, world-renowned stenographer and creator of his own shorthand system.
- Cesare Segre (born 4 April 1928 in Verzuolo, Province of Cuneo) is an Italian philologist, semiotician and literary critic of Jewish descent, currently the Director of the Texts and Textual Traditions Research Centre of the Institute for Advanced Studies of Pavia (IUSS).
- Flavio Briatore (born 12 April 1950 in Verzuolo) is a financier, former executive of the Benetton Group, team principal for the Benetton and Renault Formula One teams, and chairman of Queens Park Rangers F.C.

== Demographic evolution ==
Historical population

Year	Pop.	±%
1861	4,804	—
1871	5,102	+6.2%
1881	5,217	+2.3%
1901	5,172	−0.9%
1911	5,250	+1.5%

Year	Pop.	±%
1921	5,408	+3.0%
1931	5,668	+4.8%
1936	5,805	+2.4%
1951	5,904	+1.7%
1961	6,010	+1.8%

Year	Pop.	±%
1971	6,265	+4.2%
1981	6,029	−3.8%
1991	6,020	−0.1%
2001	6,196	+2.9%

Source: Data from ISTAT

== See also ==
- Castle of Verzuolo
