= Azalaïs of Montferrat =

Marchioness of Saluzzo from c. 1182 to 1215

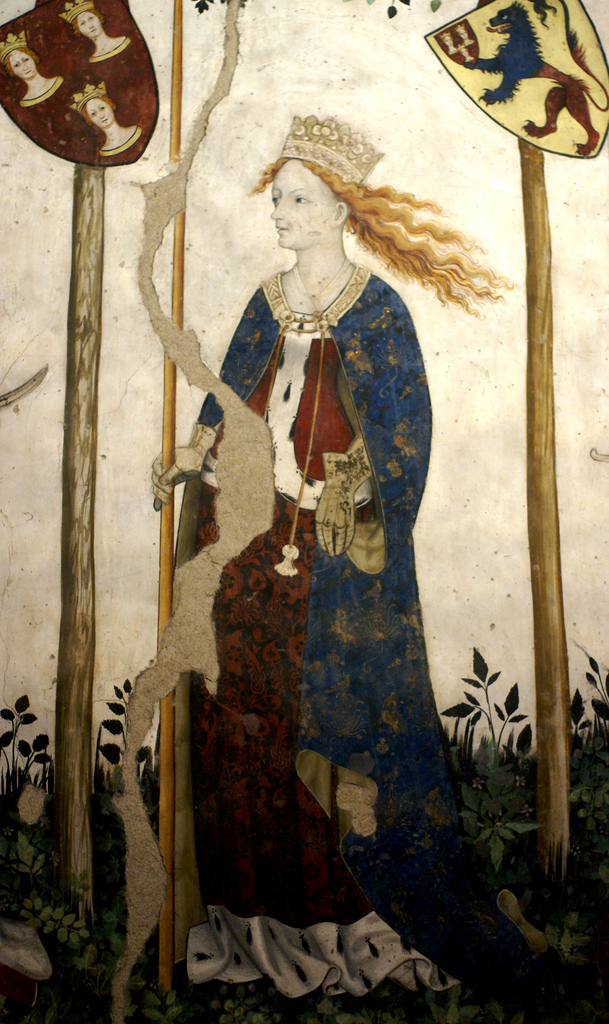
Alasia of Montferrat as Sinope

Azalaïs of Montferrat (also Adelasia or Alasia) (1150–1232) was Marchioness consort of Saluzzo by marriage to Manfred II of Saluzzo, and regent for her grandson, Manfred III of Saluzzo from 1215 to 1218.

== Biography ==
Azalaïs was one of at least three daughters of William V of Montferrat and his wife Judith of Babenberg. Her brothers included William of Montferrat, Count of Jaffa and Ascalon, Conrad I of Jerusalem, and Boniface of Montferrat.

She married Marquis Manfred II of Saluzzo before 1182, in which year she received lands in Saluzzo, Racconigi, Villa, Centallo and Quaranta, in case her marriage (like that of her sister Agnes) should need to be annulled for reasons of sterility.

Like her brother Boniface, Azalaïs was a patron of troubadours. She is mentioned in Peire Vidal's song, Estat ai gran sazo:

Dieus sal l'onrat marques
E sa bella seror...
(God save the honoured marquis
And his beautiful sister)

and is the dedicatee of his Bon' aventura don Dieus als Pizas.

Around 1192, she had built the church of San Lorenzo, which she granted to the canons of San Lorenzo in Oulx; her eldest son, Boniface, named after her brother, is mentioned for the first time in the donation. However, Boniface died in 1212, and with the death of her husband in February 1215, Azalaïs became regent of Saluzzo for her grandson, Manfred III.

In 1216, she made a treaty with Thomas I of Savoy for a marriage between his son Amadeus and her granddaughter Agnes. However, the marriage never took place, possibly on grounds of consanguinity, since Azalaïs was a first cousin of Thomas's father. Amadeus married Anne of Burgundy, and Agnes became Abbess of the Cistercian convent of Santa Maria della Stella in Rifreddo. Azalaïs also made political and ecclesiastical agreements with Alba and with the Bishop of Asti.

When young Manfred reached his majority in 1218, Azalaïs returned to church patronage. In 1224, she endowed the convent of Rifreddo with the income of the church of San Ilario. In 1227, she made further grants to the canons of Oulx. She died in 1232, and was buried in the Cistercian abbey of Santa Maria di Staffarda.

== Issue ==
Manfred and Azalaïs had at least five children:

- Agnes m. Comita III, giudice of Logudoro, in Sardinia.
- Boniface (the heir, who predeceased his father) m. Maria of Torres (daughter of Agnes's husband). They were the parents of Manfred II's successor Manfred III of Saluzzo
- Margaret m. Geoffrey de Salvaing.
- (daughter, given name unknown) m. Marquis William II of Ceva.
- Thomas.

== Sources ==
- Ernest Hoepffner, Le Troubadour Peire Vidal: sa vie et son œuvre, Paris, 1961
- A M Patrone, "Alasia", Dizionario Biografico degli Italiani, vol. 1, p. 583
- Leopoldo Usseglio, I Marchesi di Monferrato in Italia ed in Oriente durante i secoli XII e XIII, 1926.
