= Col de la Traversette =

Mountain pass on the France–Italy border

Coordinates: 44.7105°N 7.0664°E

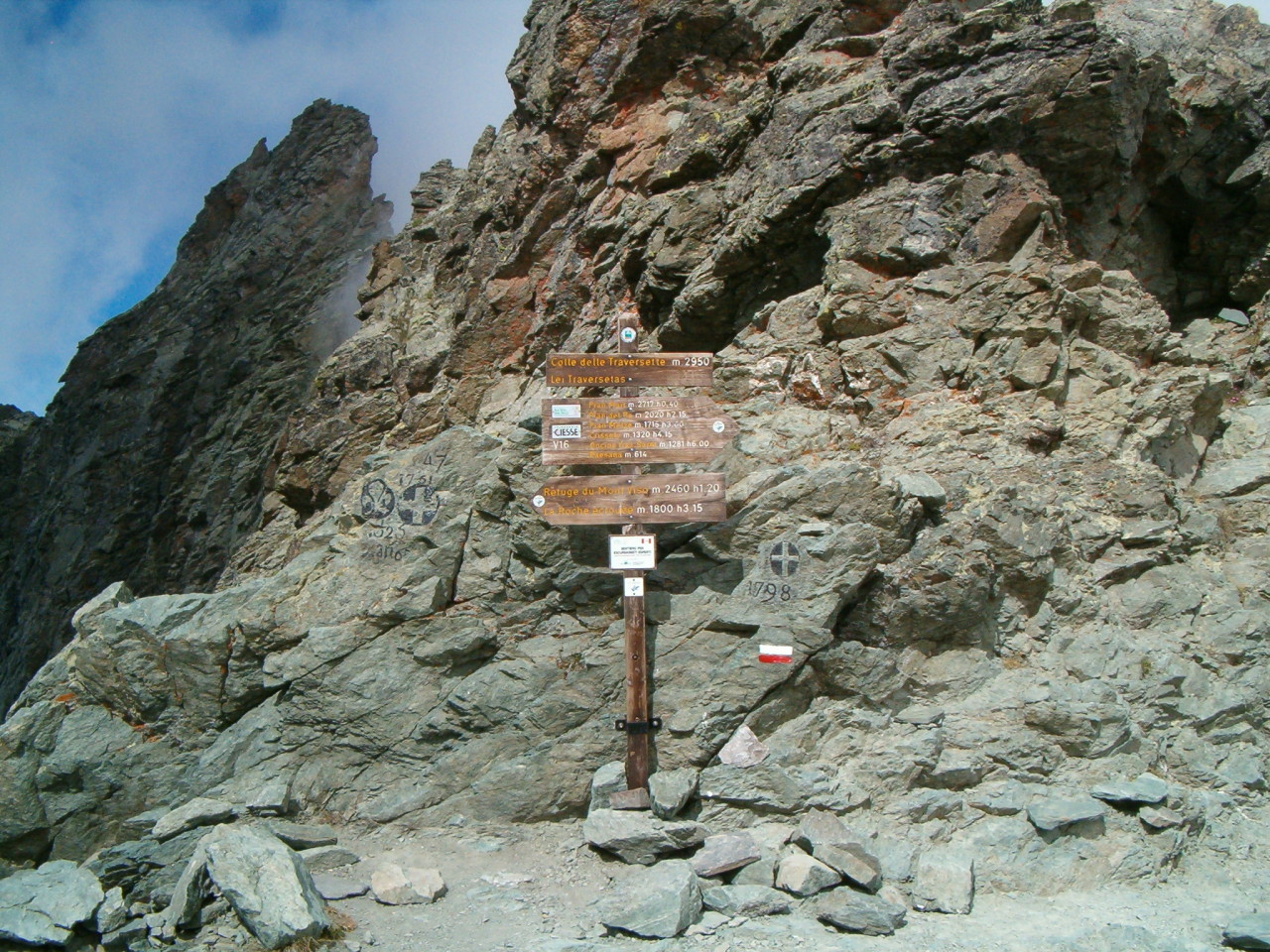
Col de la Traversette - Colle delle Traversette

The Col de la Traversette (Italian: Colle delle Traversette) is a bridle pass with an altitude of 2,947 metres (9,669 ft) in the Cottian Alps. Located between Crissolo and Abriès, it lies on the border between Italy and France and separates the Monviso (3,841 m (12,602 ft)) from the Monte Granero (3,171 m (10,404 ft)). The Blue Trail of the Via Alpina and the Giro di Viso cross the pass.

The 75-metre-long (246 ft) Monte Viso Tunnel (French: Tunnel de la Traversette, Italian: Buco di Viso) is a pedestrian tunnel constructed between 1478 and 1480 to bypass the Col.

== Possible site of Hannibal's Alpine crossing ==
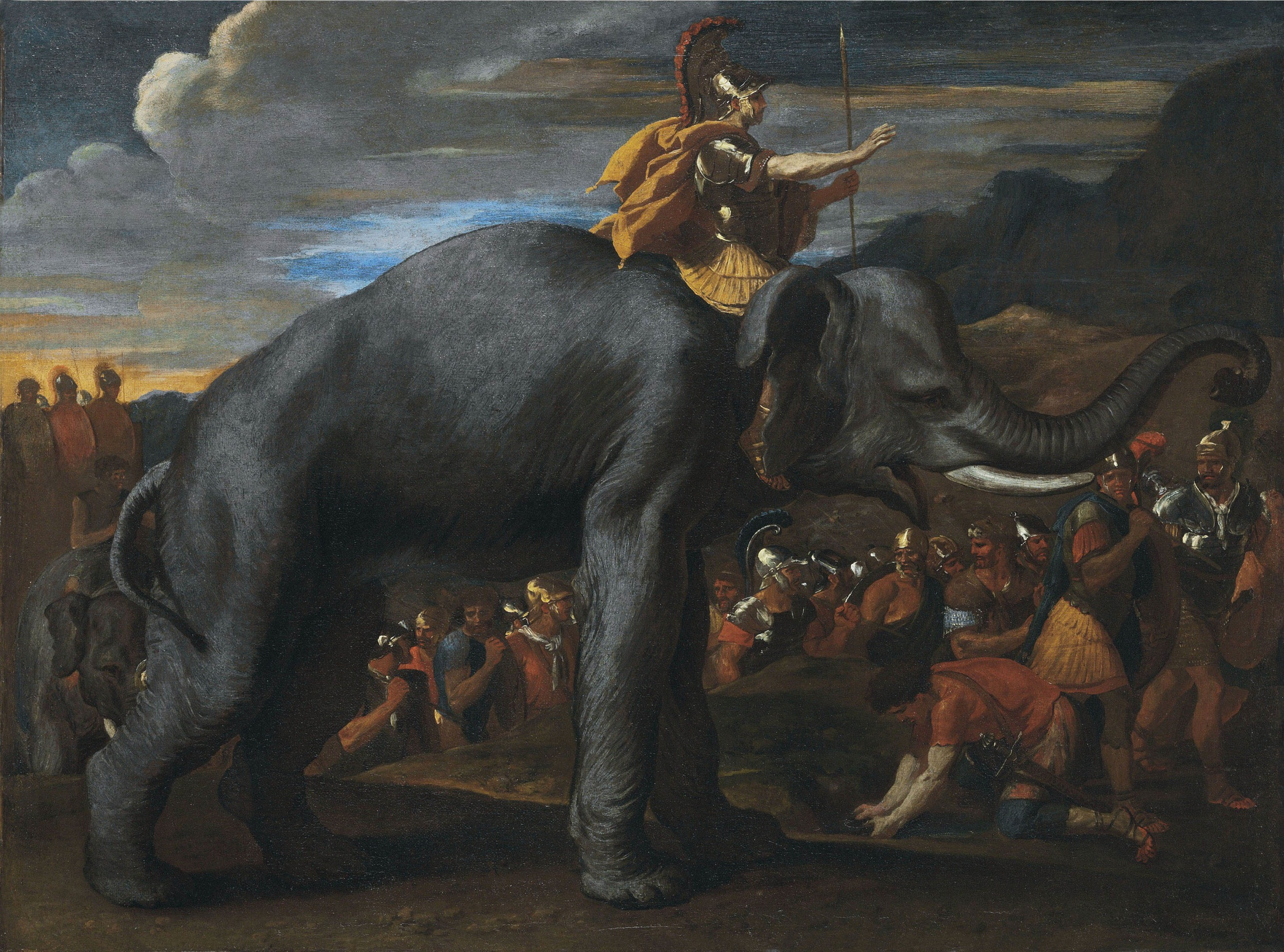
Hannibal crossing the Alps on elephants; Col de la Traversette is one possible route.

In the 1950s, Gavin de Beer was the first to propose the pass as the likely site at which Hannibal had crossed the Alps. However, the eminent Polybian scholar F. W. Walbank rejected de Beer's theory in 1956.

De Beer's thesis received renewed support in 2016 when geologist William Mahaney et al. reported that sediments had been identified near the pass that had been churned up by "the constant movement of thousands of animals and humans" and dated them to approximately 218 BC, the time of Hannibal's invasion.

However, since the radiocarbon dating method that processed the Mahaney expedition samples had a standard deviation of plus or minus 60 years, and several other armies are known to have crossed the Alps in this period, Mahaney's findings were not definitive despite widespread speculation at the time. In particular, no Carthaginian artifacts or elephant bones attributable to the numerous fatalities suffered by the army have been found.
