= Jean de Lescun =

Jean de Lescun d'Armagnac (died 1473?), known as "the bastard of Armagnac", was an ally of king Louis XI of France from before the latter's accession to the throne.

He was the illegitimate son of Arnaud Guillaume of Lescun, Bishop of Aire, and Annette of Armagnac. He was made Marshal of France in 1461. He was one of four men to hold this title under Louis XI. Lescun was also made Count of Comminges.

De Lescun was named seneschal of Valentinois, then governor of Guyenne “in consideration that, in the great need of the King, he had left behind his parents, friends, goods and all heritages which he had in Gascogne to follow him and to accompany him”.

In 1465 he married Marguerite di Saluzzo (died after 1478), daughter of Ludovico I, Marquess of Saluzzo.

In 1469 de Lescun became one of the first knights in the Order of Saint Michael. He died in 1473.

== Sources ==
- French Wikipedia
