= Frederick I of Saluzzo =

Marquess of Saluzzo from 1330 until 1336

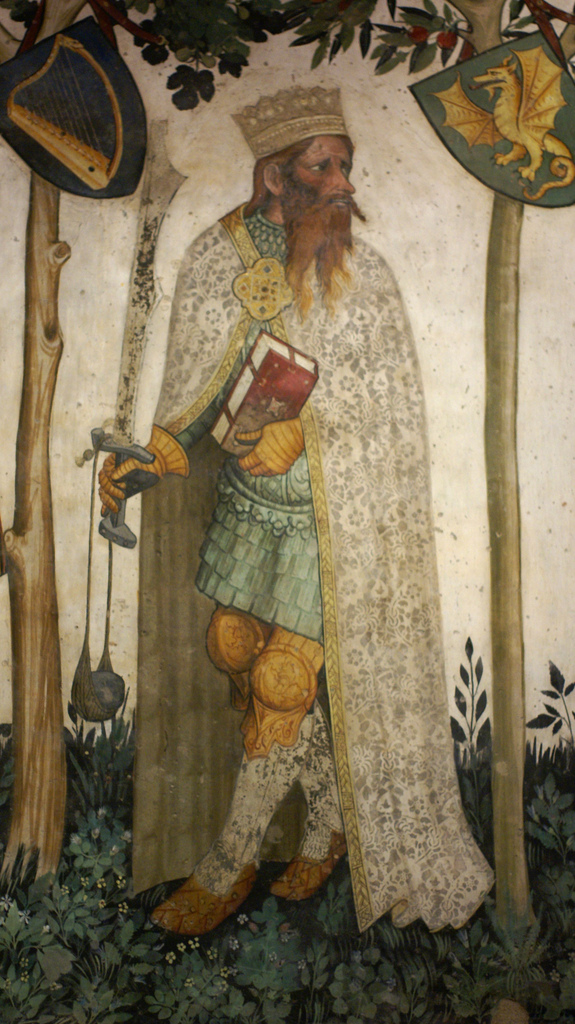
Frederick I marquess of Saluzzo.

Frederick I (1287–1336) was the seventh Marquess of Saluzzo from 1330 until his death.

He was the eldest son of Manfred IV of Saluzzo by his first wife Beatrice, daughter of King Manfred of Sicily.

He was overlooked by his father, who appointed his younger half-brother, by second wife Isabella Doria, Manfred, as his successor. A civil war broke out on the elder Manfred's death in 1330 and for two years the brothers fought each other over the margravial throne. With the help of the intercession of his cousin, Amadeus VI of Savoy, he was recognised as sole margrave on 29 July 1332. He was only margrave for four years before he died and was succeeded by his son, Thomas.

== Marriage and children ==
Frederick married first Margaret, daughter of Humbert I of Viennois. They had:

- Thomas II of Saluzzo
- An unnamed daughter Married Pietro Cambiano, Lord of Ruffia.

He married secondly Giacomina of Biandrete. She was a daughter of William, Lord of San Giorgio. They had no known children:

He also had an illegitimate son, Giacomo, Lord of Brondello.

== Sources ==
- Chaubet, Daniel (1984). "Une enquête historique en Savoie au XVe siècle". Journal des savants (in French). 1–2: 93–125. doi:10.3406/jds.1984.1477.

| Preceded by Manfred IV | Marquess of Saluzzo; 1330–1336 | Succeeded by Thomas II |
