= Manfred III of Saluzzo =

Marquess of Saluzzo from 1215 to 1244

Manfred III
- Marquess of Saluzzo
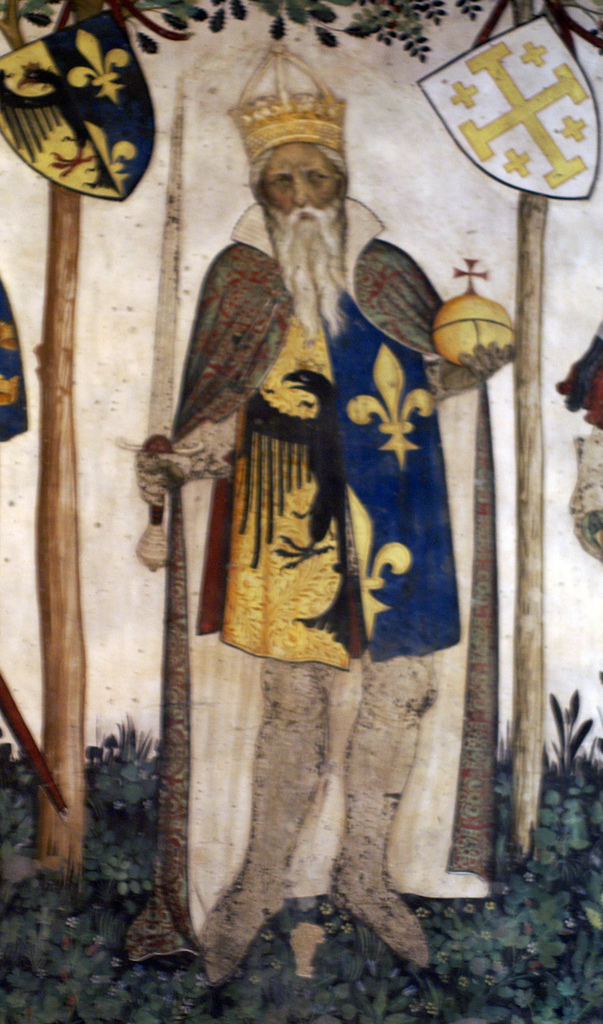
- Died: 1244
- Noble family: Aleramici
- Spouse: Beatrice of Savoy
- Issue: 4, including Thomas I of Saluzzo
- Father: Boniface of Saluzzo
- Mother: Maria di Torres

Manfred III (died 1244) was the third Marquess of Saluzzo, from 1215 to his death. He was the son of Boniface of Saluzzo and Maria di Torres of Sassari (in Sardinia). Since his father died in 1212, he succeeded his grandfather Manfred II as marquess on the latter's death in 1215. His paternal grandmother Azalaïs or Adelasia of Montferrat was regent during his minority until 1218. During that period, his grandmother paid tribute to Count Thomas I of Savoy.

Manfred fought the expansionistic policies of Thomas, as had his father, and he defended the borders of his march with care. He died in 1244 and was succeeded by his son Thomas.

He married in March 1233 to Beatrice, daughter of Amadeus IV, Count of Savoy. The couple had the following children:

- Alésia (c. 1236 – before 12 Jul 1311); married Edmund de Lacy, Baron of Pontefract
- Thomas I, Marquess of Saluzzo (1239–1296); succeeded Manfred as Marquess of Saluzzo.
- Agnes (1245 – after 4 August 1265); born posthumously, married John, son of Eustace de Vesci, no issue.
- Margaret (born 1245); born posthumously, twin of Agnes.

== Sources ==
- Chaubet, Daniel (1984). "Une enquête historique en Savoie au XVe siècle". Journal des savants (in French). 1–2: 93–125. doi:10.3406/jds.1984.1477.
- Cox, Eugene L. (1974). The Eagle of Savoy: The House of Savoy in the Thirteenth Century. Princeton University Press.
- Previté-Orton, C. W. (1912). The Early History of the House of Savoy: 1000-1233. Cambridge University Press.

Manfred III of Saluzzo Aleramici Died: 1244
Preceded by Manfred II	Marquess of Saluzzo; 1215–1244	Succeeded by Thomas I
