= Rocchetta =

Rocchetta (meaning little fort in Italian) may refer to:

== People ==
- Franco Rocchetta, italian politician

== Places ==
- Rocchetta a Volturno, Comune in the Province of Isernia
- Rocchetta Belbo, Comune in the Province of Cuneo
- Rocchetta di Vara, Comune in the Province of La Spezia
- Rocchetta e Croce, Comune in the Province of Caserta
- Rocchetta Ligure, Comune in the Province of Alessandria
- Rocchetta Nervina, Comune in the Province of Imperia
- Rocchetta Palafea, Comune in the Province of Asti
- Rocchetta Sant'Antonio, Comune in the Province of Foggia
- Rocchetta Tanaro, Comune in the Province of Asti
- Rocchetta, Cerreto di Spoleto, a frazione in the Province of Perugia
