= Manfred V of Saluzzo =

Marquess of Saluzzo from 1330 until 1332

Manfred V was marquess of Saluzzo from 1330 to 1332, and later usurper from 1341–1342.

He was the second son of Manfred IV of Saluzzo and first by his second wife, Isabella Doria. The influence of his mother at court caused his father to appoint him to succeed him as sixth marquess of Saluzzo. However, on the elder Manfred's death in 1330, his eldest son, Frederick, contested the throne, and a civil war broke out. Through the intercession of Frederick's cousin, Amadeus VI of Savoy, Manfred was forced, after being caught in a sex scandal with his own mother, to cede the throne to his brother in 1334.

After the death of Frederick in 1336, Manfred declared war on the legitimate heir, his young nephew Thomas II. His army was mostly composed of Angevin mercenaries. In 1341, after a short siege, Saluzzo surrendered, and its troops sacked it, destroying the castle. Thomas was imprisoned.

However, when the fortunes of Manfred's protector Robert of Anjou, King of Naples, declined after the battle of Gamenario, he was compelled by the Viscontis to abandon Saluzzo in 1342. He died in Pavia in 1392 and was buried in the church of San Francesco.

Preceded by Manfred IV	Marquess of Saluzzo; 1330 – 1332	Succeeded by Frederick I
