= Ludovico I of Saluzzo =

Marquess of Saluzzo from 1416 to 1475

Ludovico I del Vasto (1405–15 April 1475) was Marquess of Saluzzo from 1416 until his death.

The son of Marquess Thomas III, he held the Marquisate of Saluzzo for much of the 15th century, under its period of greatest splendour. Always in good relationships with his neighbours, he was lieutenant of the Duchy of Savoy and the Marquisate of Montferrat for several years.

His neutral policies also gained him international importance. When, in 1458, the Republic of Genoa submitted to Charles VII of France, Ludovico was chosen as governor of that city, but refused the position.

He was succeeded by his less fortunate son Ludovico II.

== Marriage and children ==
He married with Isabella Palaiologo de Montferrato (1419–1475), daughter of John Jacob, Marquess of Montferrat, and had 9 children :

- Ludovico II, his successor.
- Federico, bishop of Carpentras
- Margarita (died 1485), married Jean de Lescun, Marshal of France.
- Juan Jacobo.
- Antonio.
- Carlos Domingo, abbot of Santa Maria di Staffarda
- Blanca (d. 1487), who married Vitaliano II Borromeo (1451 - 1493)
- Amadea.
- Luisa.

Preceded by Thomas III	Marquess of Saluzzo; 1416–1475	Succeeded by Ludovico II
