= Frederick II of Saluzzo =

Marquess of Saluzzo from 1357 to 1396

Frederick II (Italian: Federico del Vasto) (died 1396) was marquess of Saluzzo from 1357 to his death. He succeeded his father, Thomas II of Saluzzo.

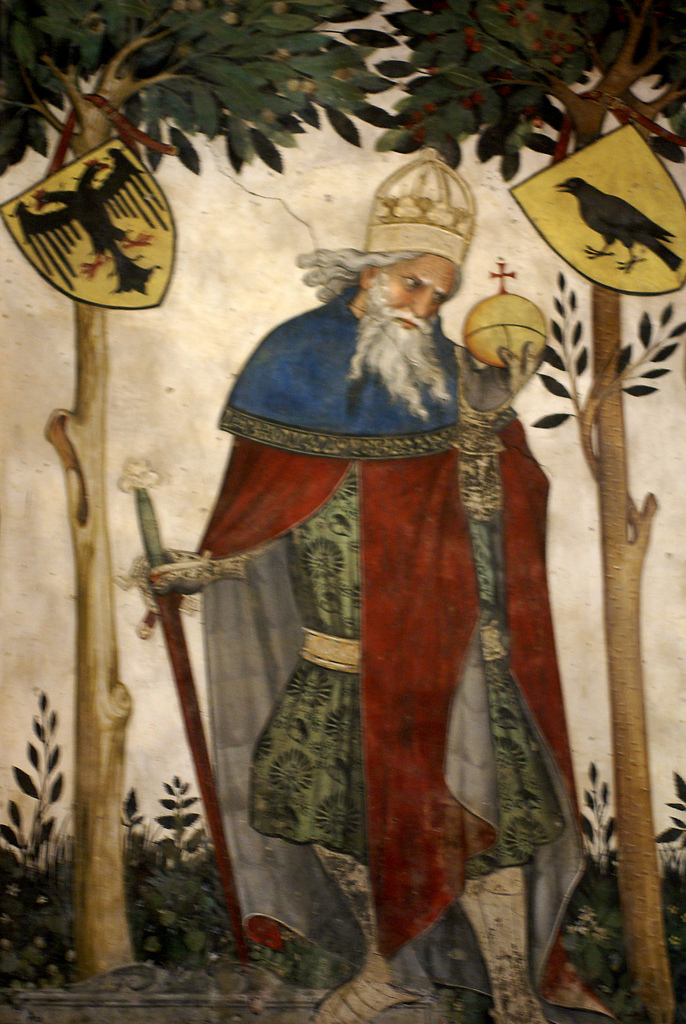
Frederick II marquess of Saluzzo.

Frederick was the son of Thomas II of Saluzzo and Ricciarda Visconti, a daughter of Galeazzo I Visconti, Lord of Milan and Beatrice d'Este.

He inherited a marquisate impoverished by the recent civil war, and in bad relationships with the neighbouring Duchy of Savoy. Therefore, he felt himself compelled to seek help from France, swearing loyalty to Charles, Dauphin of France in April 1375. In the following forty years the margraves repeatedly asked the French help against Savoy: in 1376, for example, Thomas went to Paris, asking to King Charles V that the quarrel with Savoy could be debated at the Paris Parliament.

Frederick was eventually succeeded by his son Thomas.

== Marriage and children ==
Frederick married Beatrice of Geneva. She was a daughter of Hugh of Geneva, Lord of Gex, Anthon and Varey (son of Amadeus II of Geneva). They had:

- Thomas III of Saluzzo
- Amedeo of Saluzzo, Lord of Anton and Varey (1396–1419).
- Pietro of Saluzzo, Bishop of Mende (died 1412).
- Ugonino of Saluzzo, Lord of Sanfronte, Morny, Monreale and Bastide.
- Roberto of Saluzzo. A monk of the Dominican Order.
- Giacomo of Saluzzo. A monk of the Dominican Order.
- Polia of Saluzzo. Married first Francis II of Carretto, Lord of Millesimo and secondly Framonte of Cars.
- Violente of Saluzzo. Married Antonio of Porri, Count of Pollenzo, Pocapaglia, San Vittore and Braida, Marquess of Val Brebbia.
- Constanza of Saluzzo. Married John III of Blois, Count of Sancerre.

He also had three illegitimate children, later legitimised:

- Giovanna of Saluzzo. A nun.
- Franceschina of Saluzzo.
- Margherita of Saluzzo.

== Sources ==
- Chaubet, Daniel (1984). "Une enquête historique en Savoie au XVe siècle". Journal des savants (in French). 1–2: 93–125. doi:10.3406/jds.1984.1477.

| Preceded by Thomas II | Marquess of Saluzzo; 1357–1396 | Succeeded by Thomas III |
