= Manfred Maurus =

- Died: January 15, 2008
- Scientific career
- Fields: Nueorscience
- Institutions: LMU Munich

Manfred Maurus was a German scientist, an assistant professor at LMU Munich, researcher, and head of the Department of Behavioral Physiology at the Max Planck Institute of Psychiatry. Maurus was a pioneer in neuroethology, commencing his work with Dr. Detlev Ploog. He specialized in investigating the neural basis of behavior in freely behaving squirrel monkeys (Saimiri sciureus), using radio-controlled electrical brain stimulation. Among his coworkers were Helmut Pruscha, Birgit Kühlmorgen, Paul Müller-Preuss, and Uwe Jürgens.

He retired to Canada and died on January 15, 2008.

== Bibliography ==
- Maurus M, Streit KM, Barclay D, Wiesner E, Kuehlmorgen B. Interrelations between structure and function in the vocal repertoire of Saimiri. Asking the monkeys themselves where to split and where to lump. Eur Arch Psychiatry Neurol Sci. 1986;236(1):35-9. PMID 3743584
- Muller-Preuss P, Maurus M. Coding of call components essential for intraspecific communication through auditory neurons in the squirrel monkey. Naturwissenschaften. 1985 Aug;72(8):437-8. PMID 4047174
- Maurus M, Geissler B, Kuhlmorgen B, Weisner E. The effects of brain stimulation when categorizing the behavioral repertoire of squirrel monkeys. Behav Neural Biol. 1981 Aug;32(4):438-47. PMID 7283932
- Maurus M, Kuhlmorgen B, Hartmann-Wiesner E, Pruscha H. An approach to the interpretation of the communicative meaning of visual signals in agonistic behavior of squirrel monkeys. Folia Primatol (Basel). 1975;23(3):208-26. PMID 805764
- Hupfer K, Maurus M. Operant conditioning of the squirrel monkey with social reinforcement. Naturwissenschaften. 1975 Jan;62(1):42-3. PMID 806027
- Hohne A, Maurus M. Semiautomatic conversion of behavioral data from film to paper tape for computer analysis. Physiol Behav. 1974 Aug;13(2):317-9. PMID 4415718
- Maurus M, Kuhlmorgen B, Hartmann E. Concerning the influence of experimental conditions on social interactions initiated by telestimulation in squirrel monkey groups. Brain Res. 1973 Dec 21;64:271-80. PMID 4205548
- Pruscha H, Maurus M. A statistical method for the classification of behavior units occurring in primate communication. Behav Biol. 1973 Oct;9(4):511-6. PMID 4200736
- Maurus M, Hohne A, Peetz H, Wanke J. Technical requirements for the recording of significant social signals in squirrel monkey groups. Physiol Behav. 1972 May;8(5):969-71. PMID 4625708
- Maurus M, Pruscha H. Quantitative analyses of behavioral sequences elicited by automated telestimulation in squirrel monkeys. Exp Brain Res. 1972;14(4):372-94. PMID 4626487
- Maurus M, Ploog D. Social signals in squirrel monkeys: analysis by cerebral radio stimulation. Exp Brain Res. 1971 Feb 25;12(2):171-83. PMID 4995377
- Maurus M. Investigation of social behavior in primates (Saimiri sciureus) by means of telestimulation technique. Brain Res. 1970 Dec 18;24(3):553. PMID 4992852
- Maurus M, Peetz HG, Jurgens U. Electronic sound recognition switch for automatic control of remote stimulus studies on Saimiri sciureus. Naturwissenschaften. 1970 Mar;57(3):141. German. PMID 4986169
- Jurgens U, Maurus M, Ploog D, Winter P. Vocalization in the squirrel monkey (Saimiri sciureus) elicited by brain stimulation. Exp Brain Res. 1967;4(2):114-7. PMID 4970751
- Castell R, Maurus M. The so-called marking with urine in squirrel monkeys (Saimiri sciureus) in relation to environmental and emotional factors. Folia Primatol (Basel). 1967;6(3):170-6. German. PMID 4965009
- Maurus M. New long-range stimulus apparatus for small primates. Naturwissenschaften. 1967;54(22):593. German. PMID 5587800
- Maurus M, Mitra J, Ploog D. Cerebral representation of the clitoris in ovariectomized squirrel monkeys. Exp Neurol. 1965 Nov;13(3):283-8. PMID 4954821
