= Thomas II of Saluzzo =

Marquess of Saluzzo from 1336 to 1357

Thomas II (Italian: Tommaso del Vasto) (1304 – 18 August 1357) was Marquess of Saluzzo from 1336 to his death. He succeeded his father, Frederick I.

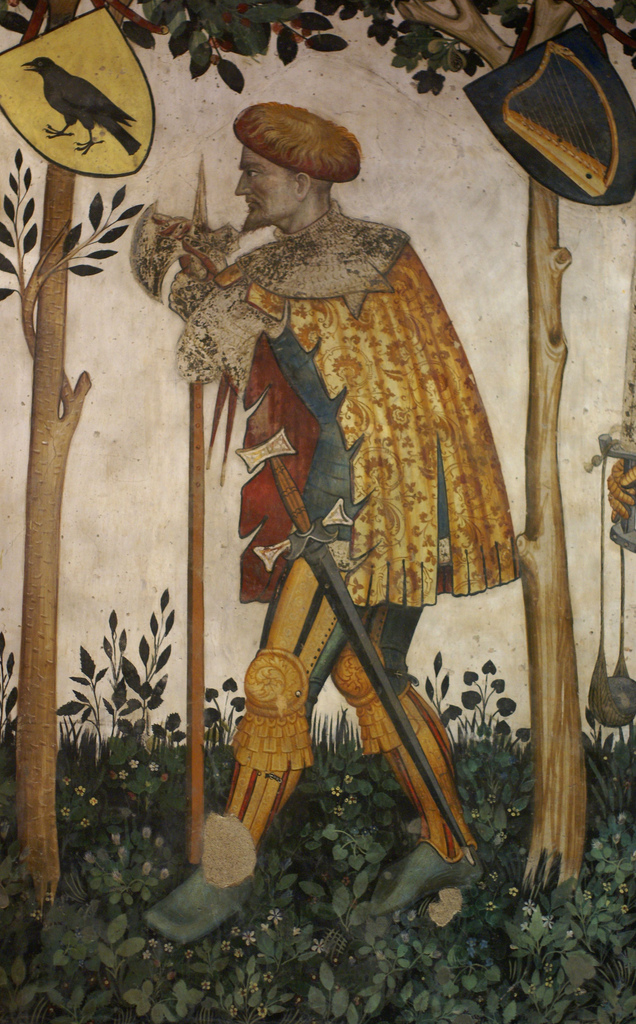
Thomas II, Marquess of Saluzzo

He was the son of Frederick I, Marquess of Saluzzo and Margarete de La Tour du Pin, a daughter of Humbert I de La Tour du Pin, Dauphin de Viennois.

His succession was disputed by his uncle Manfred. The ensuing war was part of the wider Guelf–Ghibelline conflict. Thomas, who had married a Visconti, was a Ghibelline and Manfred a Guelf with the support of the Angevin King Robert of Naples. Robert therefore, to reduce Ghibelline (and Visconti) power in the north, advanced on Saluzzo and besieged it. He succeeded in taking it and sacking it, setting the city on fire and imprisoning Thomas, who had to pay a ransom. The whole dramatic event is recorded by Silvio Pellico.

In August 1347, he joined John II, Marquess of Montferrat and Humbert II of Viennois as they attacked Savoy and conquered the Angevin lands in northern Italy after the death of Robert. The 1348 treaty which resolved this war left none of the participants satisfied. Thomas now owed allegiance to Milan, as well as his prior allegiance to Savoy.

Thomas was eventually succeeded by his son Frederick II.

== Marriage and children ==
Thomas married Ricciarda Visconti. She was a daughter of Galeazzo I Visconti, Lord of Milan and Beatrice d'Este. They had:

- Frederick II, Marquess of Saluzzo
- Galeazzo of Saluzzo (born 1332, date of death unknown). Considered to have died young.
- Azonne of Saluzzo (c. 1336–1426). Lord of Monasterolo, Oncino, Paesana, Crissolo, Sanfront and Castellar.
- Eustacchio of Saluzzo (died 1405). Count of Cervinasco and Monesiglio, Lord of San Pietro Monterosso, Montemale and Prasleves.
- Luchino of Saluzzo. Squire to the Counts of Savoy, possibly illegitimate.
- Constanza of Saluzzo.
- Giacomo of Saluzzo.
- Luchina of Saluzzo. Married Giovanni Beccaria.
- Beatrice of Saluzzo. Married Antoni Falletto, Lord of Villafaletto.
- Pentesilea of Saluzzo. Married Ludovico of Chiesa.
- Anna of Saluzzo. A nun.

Preceded by Frederick I	Marquess of Saluzzo; 1336–1357	Succeeded by Frederick II

== Sources ==
- Chaubet, Daniel (1984). "Une enquête historique en Savoie au XVe siècle". Journal des savants (in French). 1–2: 93–125. doi:10.3406/jds.1984.1477.
- Cox, Eugene L. (1967). The Green Count of Savoy. Princeton, New Jersey: Princeton University Press. LCCN 67-11030.
- Gentile, Luisa Clotilde (2004). Araldica saluzzese il medioevo (in Italian). Società per gli studi storici archeologici ed artistici della provincia di Cuneo. ISBN 9788866250036.
