= Castello della Manta =

Castle in Piedmont, Italy

Manta Castle
- Castello della Manta
- Moncrivello, Piedmont, Italy
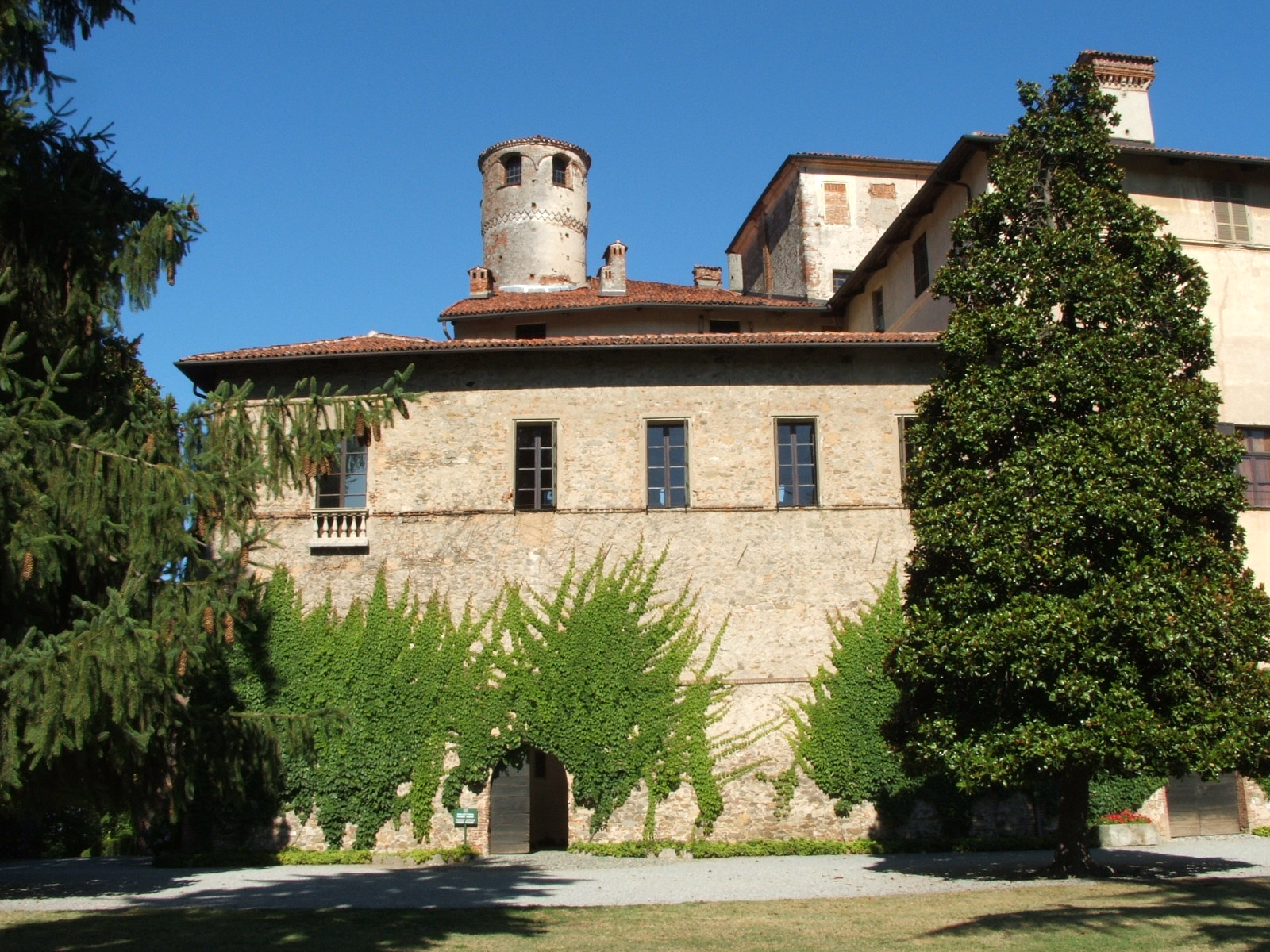
- Manta Castle in 2006

Site information
- Type: Castle

Location
- Location within Italy
- Coordinates: 44°36′52″N 07°28′58″E

Castello della Manta is a castle at Manta near Saluzzo, Province of Cuneo, region of Piedmont, in northern Italy.

== History ==
The original building, dating from the 12th century, was later enlarged and transformed into a noble residence by the Saluzzo della Manta family, margraves of Saluzzo.

== Description ==
Among the numerous rooms, the Baronial Hall (Salone Baronale) is notable for the fresco cycle decorating its walls, a rare masterpiece of Late Gothic painting in northern Italy. The work is attributed to the anonymous Master of Castello della Manta. The cycle, completed soon after 1420, portrays the Nove Prodi, the Nine Worthies with their Nine Female Heroines. The artist may have used as models members of the House of the Margraves of Saluzzo. The figures are shown wearing precious contemporary clothing. Also depicted is the so-called Fountain of Youth, a theme taken from the tradition of French medieval stories. The scene is inspired by the poem by Marquess Thomas III of Saluzzo, Le Chevalier Errant.

The Sala delle Grottesche was decorated in the Mannerist style of the 16th century, and was commissioned by Count Michele Antonio della Manta around 1560. It has a finely painted ceiling, decorated with stuccoes, grotesques, ancient ruins and buildings.

Annexed to the castle is the church, whose apse has a series of frescoes about the life of Christ dating from the same time as the Baronial Hall decorations.

== Gallery ==
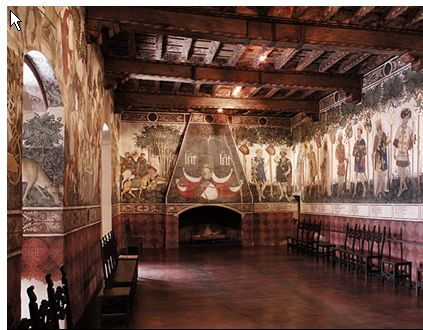
I Nove Prodi, the Nine Worthies. Fresco by the Maestro del Castello della Manta, c.1420. The series continues to the right with depictions of their female counterparts

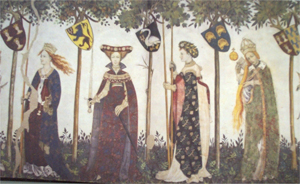
Detail of the fresco showing 4 of the female counterparts to the Nine Worthies

== See also ==
- List of castles in Italy
