= List of marquises of Saluzzo =

Coat of arms of the Del Vasto dynasty, which ruled the Marquisate for its entire history.

The marquises (also marquesses or margraves) of Saluzzo were the medieval feudal rulers city of Saluzzo (today part of Piedmont, Italy) and its countryside from circa 1175, to 1549. Originally counts, the family received in feudum the city from the margrave of Turin, Ulric Manfred. It passed to the margrave of Susa, of the del Vasto family of Savona, and, in 1175, it was raised to margravial status by the Emperor Frederick I. In 1549, it was annexed to France during the Italian Wars. It remained under French control until 1601, when it was ceded to the Duke of Savoy in exchange for Bresse and surrounding territories.

== Marquises ==
- Manfred I (1125–1175)
- Manfred II (1175–1215)
- Manfred III (1215–1244)
- Thomas I (1244–1296)
- Manfred IV (1296–1330)
  - Manfred V, civil war with his brother until 1332
  - Frederick I, civil war with his brother until 1332
- Frederick I (1332–1336)
- Thomas II (1336–1357)
- Frederick II (1357–1396)
- Thomas III (1396–1416)
- Ludovico I (1416–1475)
- Ludovico II (1475–1504)
- Michele Antonio (1504–1528)
- Gian Ludovico (1528–1529, d.1563), deposed
- Francesco Ludovico I (1529–1537)
- Gian Gabriele (1537–1548)

== See also ==
- Marquisate of Saluzzo
- Saluzzo
