= Manfred II of Saluzzo =

Second marquess of Saluzzo (1140–1215)

Manfred II (1140–1215) was the second marquess of Saluzzo from his father's death in 1175 to his own. He was the son of Manfred I and Eleanor. He placed the capital of the margravate definitively in Saluzzo.

He married Azalaïs of Montferrat (also Alasia, or Alice) before 1182, forming an alliance with one of the most powerful dynasties in northern Italy.

Manfred expanded the march and fought against the expansionism of the neighbouring counts of Savoy. After several minor skirmishes, the two principalities came to terms in 1213 and peace was established for the final two years of his life. Since his eldest son, Boniface, had predeceased him in 1212, he was succeeded by his grandson, Manfred III, under the regency of Azalaïs. She had to pay tribute on behalf of young Manfred, and for the next century, Saluzzo was a vassal of Savoy.

== Family ==
Manfred and Azalais had:

- Agnes, married Comita III of Torres and founded the nunnery of St Mary of Rifreddo in 1220
- Boniface (the heir, who predeceased his father), married Maria di Torres, daughter of the aforementioned Comita. They were the parents of Manfred II's successor, Manfredo III of Saluzzo
- Margaret, married Geoffrey de Salvaing
- María, married Marquis William II of Ceva
- Thomas.

He also fathered an illegitimate son, Bastardino.

== Sources ==
- Berman, Constance Hoffman (2018). The White Nuns: Cistercian Abbeys for Women in Medieval France. University of Pennsylvania Press. ISBN 978-0-8122-5010-7

Preceded by Manfred I	Marquess of Saluzzo; 1175–1215	Succeeded by Manfred III
