= Saluzzo =

Saluzzo Salusse (Piedmontese)
- Comune
- Città di Saluzzo
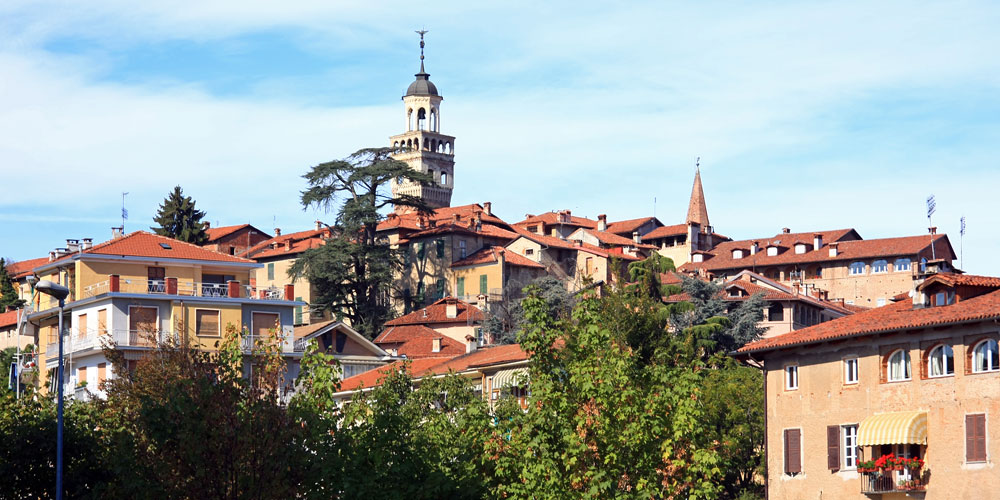

- Flag Coat of arms

- Location within Italy Location within Piedmont
- Coordinates: 44°39′N 07°29′E
- Country: Italy
- Region: Piedmont
- Province: Cuneo (CN)
- Frazioni: Casa Fornace, Cascina Budigiai, Castellar, Colombaro Rossi, La Creusa, La Stella, Le Prese, Regione Liona, Regione Paschere, Revalanca, Ruata Eandi, Ruata Re, San Bernardino, Sant'Ugo, Torrazza

Government
  - Mayor: Mauro Calderoni (since 27 May 2014) (Civic List)

Area
  - Total: 75 km^{2} (29 sq mi)
- Elevation: 395 m (1,296 ft)

Population (31 December 2023)
  - Total: 17,574
  - Density: 230/km^{2} (610/sq mi)
- Demonym: Saluzzese(i)
- Time zone: UTC+1 (CET)
  - Summer (DST): UTC+2 (CEST)
- Postal code: 12037
- Dialing code: 0175
- Patron saint: St. Chiaffredo
- Saint day: The Monday after the first Sunday of September
- Website: www.comune.saluzzo.cn.it

Saluzzo (Italian: [saˈluttso]; Piedmontese: Salusse [saˈlyse]) is a town and former principality in the province of Cuneo, in the Piedmont region, Italy.

The city of Saluzzo is built on a hill overlooking a vast, well-cultivated plain. Iron, lead, silver, marble, slate, etc. are found in the surrounding mountains. On 1 January 2017, it had a population of 17.581.

Saluzzo was the birthplace of the writer Silvio Pellico and the typographer Giambattista Bodoni.

== History ==
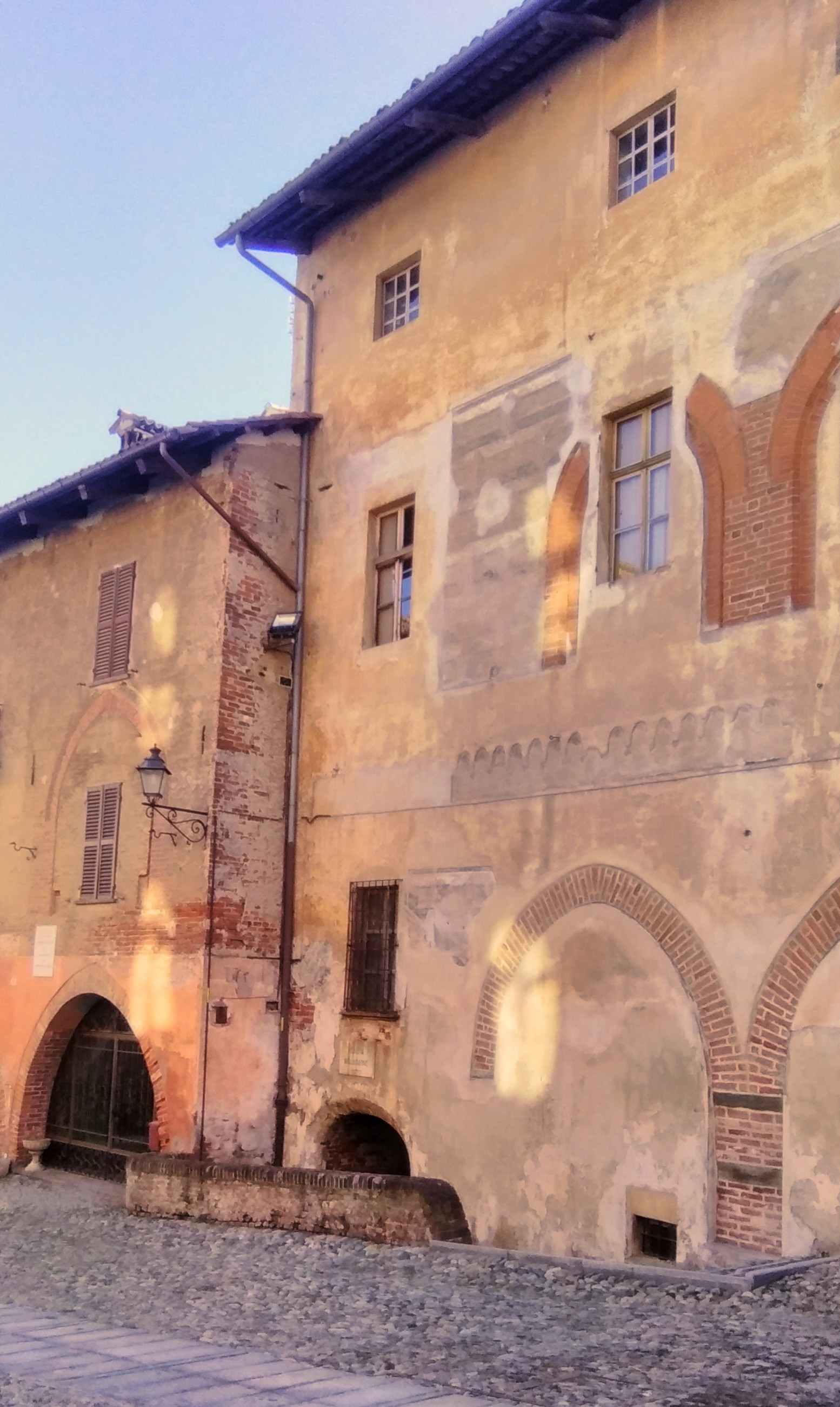
Medieval buildings in the old sector

Saluzzo (Salusse in Piedmontese) was a civitas (tribal city-state) of the Vagienni, or mountain Ligures, and later of the Salluvii. This district was brought under Roman control by the Consul Marcus Fulvius c. 125 BC.

In the Carolingian age it became the residence of a count; later, having passed to the Marquesses of Susa, Manfred I, son of Marquess Bonifacio del Vasto, on the division of that principality, became Marquess of Saluzzo; this family held the marquisate of Saluzzo from 1142 to 1548. The marquisate embraced the territory lying between the Alps, the Po and the Stura, and was extended on several occasions. In the Middle Ages it had a chequered existence, often being in conflict with powerful neighbours, chiefly the Counts (later Dukes) of Savoy. After Manfred II's death, his widow had to accept a series of tributes, which were to be later the basis of the House of Savoy's claims over the increasingly feebler marquises' territories. Thomas III, a vassal of France, wrote the romance Le chevalier errant ('the knight-errant').

Ludovico I (1416–75) started the Golden Age of the city and imposed himself as a mediator between the neighbouring powers. Ludovico II constructed a tunnel, no longer in use, through the Monviso, a remarkable work for the time. With the help of the French, he resisted a vigorous siege by the Duke of Savoy in 1486, but in 1487 yielded and retired to France, where he wrote L'art de la chevalerie sous Vegèce ("The art of chivalry under Vegetius", 1488), a treatise on good government, and other works on military affairs. He was a patron of clerics and authors. In 1490, Ludovico regained power, but after his death, his sons struggled long for the rule and impoverished the state.

After long struggles for independence, the marquisate was occupied (1548) by the French, as a fief of the Crown of France – with the name of Saluces – and remained part of that kingdom until it was ceded to Savoy in 1601. In 1588 Charles Emmanuel I of Savoy took possession of the city. Thenceforward Saluzzo shared the destinies of Piedmont, with which it formed "one of the keys of the house" of Italy.

The Marquisate of Saluzzo is the setting of Boccaccio's tale of Griselda, the final story in the Decameron, as well as Chaucer's Clerk's Tale in The Canterbury Tales.

The municipality of Saluzzo absorbed at the beginning of 2019 the neighbouring commune of Castellar, thus enforcing the results of a referendum held in the summer of 2018.

== Geography ==
The municipality of Saluces occupies a vast area of 7,659 ha (18,930 acres) in the Po Valley, about 35 km (22 mi) east of Mount Viso.

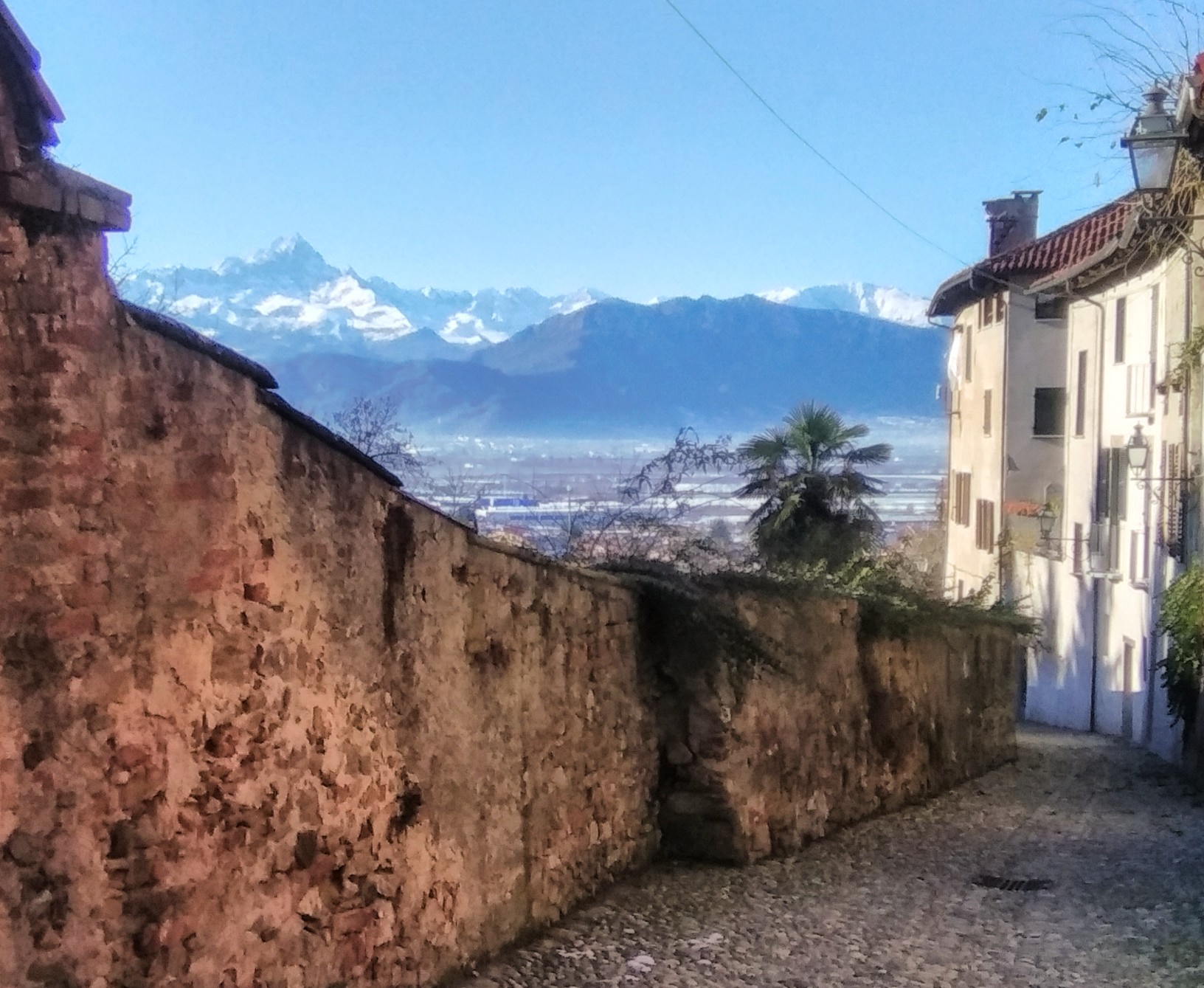
Medieval street with the city wall and Monviso visible in the distance

== Duomo ==
The Cathedral of Saluzzo, also known as the Cathedral, dedicated to the Virgin Mary of the Assumption, stands out for its Late-Gothic forms; built outside the walls just beyond Porta Santa Maria between 1491 and 1501, it was a bishop's seat starting in 1511. The façade is in exposed brick, adorned by three portals surmounted by terracotta gables that house statues of the apostles (central portal), while above the side there are the patrons San Chiaffredo and San Costanzo. The interior has a covering made up of cross vaults, while the Baroque high altar, with its large impact, is of great impact eleven wooden statues by Carlo Giuseppe Plura and collaborators. In the central nave, you can admire a precious fourteenth-century wooden crucifix. To the left of the main altar is the Chapel of the SS. Sacramento, with a polyptych by the Flemish artist of French origin Hans Clemer, better known as Maestro d'Elva.

== Toponymy ==
The Marquisate of Saluzzo was the seat of a Piedmontese principality whose history is closely linked to that of its powerful neighbour, the House of Savoy, until its definitive incorporation, obtained in 1601 by Duke Charles Emmanuel I.

The French name of Saluces was given to the city during the period of French domination. There are many traces of this francization still today, such as on the pediment of the casa cavassa today transformed into a museum, where you can read the motto "right whatever it is."

== Main sights ==
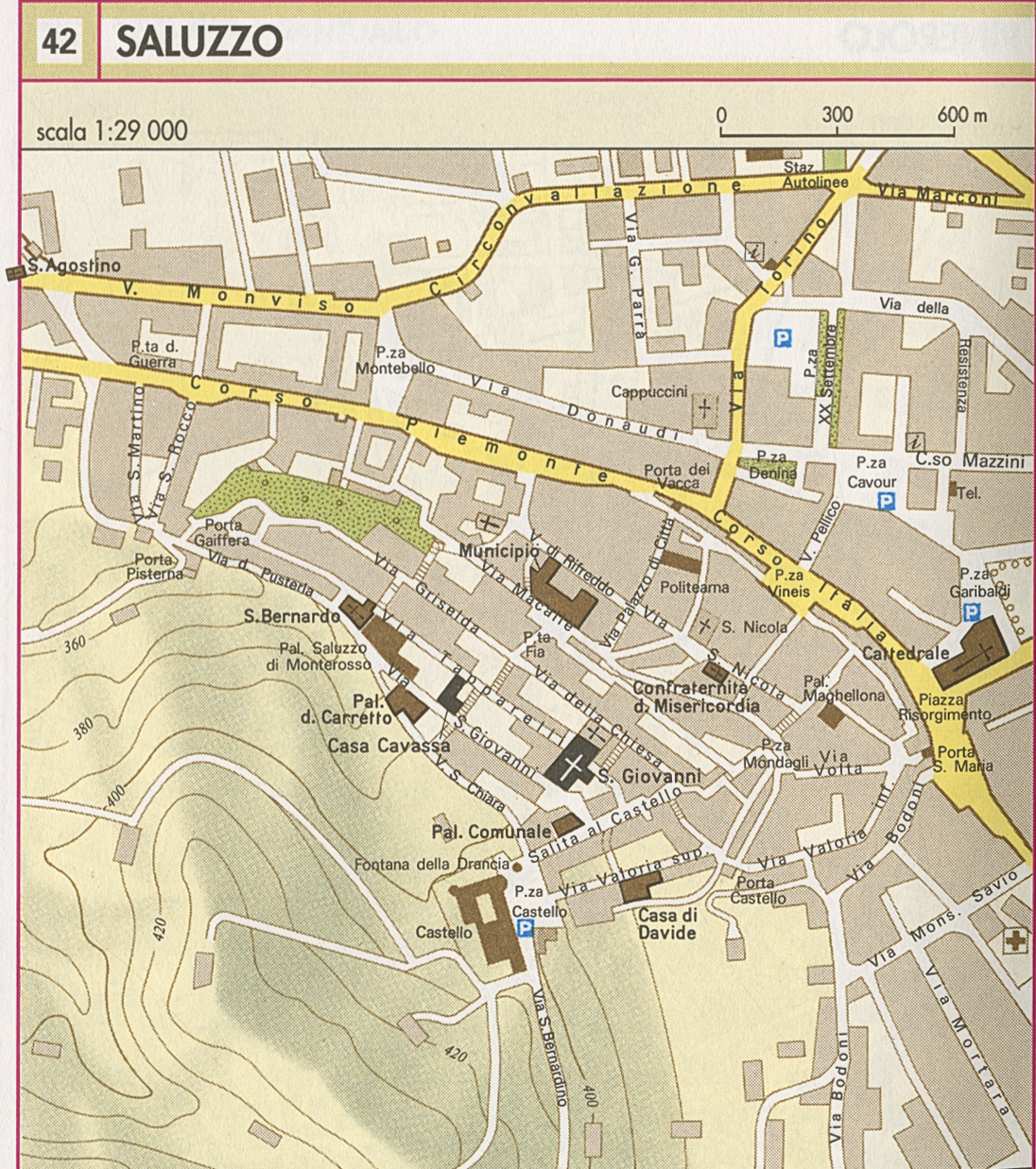
Map of city center

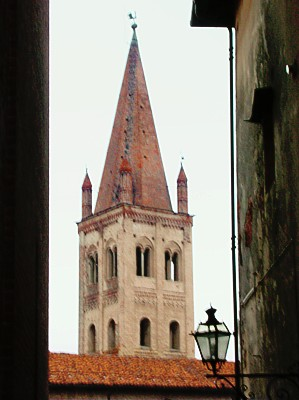
Chiesa di San Giovanni

- Cathedral of Saluzzo (1491–1501): The church was built in Lombard-Gothic style. The façade is decorated with rose-windows, frescoes (almost totally faded) and statues. The interior contains a magnificent Baroque high altar, plus a 16th-century terracotta group portraying the Deposition, ad Adoration of the Shepherds by Sebastiano Ricci.
- San Bernardo church, formerly belonging to the Conventuals, has interesting tombs of the counts della Torre.
- San Giovanni: Dominican church begun in 1330 in Gothic style and completed in 1504 with Bramantesque influences. The façade is Gothic. The apse, from 1504, houses a Funerary Chapel of Ludovico II, a work by Antoine Le Moiturier (1425–74) covered with green stone and characterized by an elegant play of arches and sculptures. The sepulchre of Ludovico II is a Renaissance work by Benedetto Briosco. Annexed are the Gothic cloister and the Capitular Hall with the Mausoleum of a vicar-general of the marquisate, Galeazzo Cavassa di Carmagnola, a Renaissance work by Matteo Sanmicheli.
- Casa Cavassa: site of the civic museum and rebuilt with a Renaissance interior.
- San Agostino and San Bernardino
- Town Hall is the former Jesuit College, while the older one (1462), with a bold tower, is utilized by the Court of Assizes. The 16th-century Villa Belvedere has elegant rooms with late-Renaissance decorations.

== Notable people ==
- Alice of Saluzzo
- Alberto Basso, music historian and lexicographer
- Giambattista Bodoni, typographer
- Giovanni Canaveri, related to the May Revolution
- General Carlo Alberto Dalla Chiesa
- Paolo De Chiesa, skier
- Marquess Michele Antonio di Saluzzo
- Isacco Levi, partisan
- Federico Lombardi, Jesuit priest, director of Radio Vatican
- Pier Paolo Maggiora, architect
- Luciano Nizzola, soccer dirigent
- Magda Olivero, singer
- Matteo Olivero, Italian painter related to divisionism
- Silvio Pellico, writer
- Elvira Petrozzi, nun and founder of Saluzzo-based international youth community Comunità Cenacolo
- Corrado Segre, mathematician
- Giacomo Segre, artillery officer in the Third Italian War of Independence, born in Saluzzo

== See also ==
- Beato Giovanni Giovenale Ancina
- Castle of Verzuolo
- Diocese of Saluzzo
- Griselda (folklore)
- List of Margraves of Saluzzo
- Marquisate of Saluzzo
- Saluzzo Race Walking School
- Saluzzo Roosters
