= Del Carretto =

Italian noble family

Coat of arms of Del Carretto family

The House of Del Carretto (alternatively, Carretto, Carretus, or del Carreto) is the name of an old and influential Italian noble family, whose members occupied many important political and ecclesiastical positions in Northwest Italy, mostly in Liguria and Piedmont.

== History ==
The Del Carretto family has descended from the House of Aleramici and was divided into many branches, feudal lords of the western Ligurian Riviera and of Lower Piedmont. The founder of the dynasty was Henry del Vasto, son of Boniface del Vasto, lord of Western Liguria and southern Piedmont. Henry is also often called Enrico I Del Carretto, although he has never used this name. Henry del Vasto, Marquis of Savona and one of the main collaborators of Frederick Barbarossa, had two sons, Otto and Henry, who after his death (about 1185) divided his dominions.

The territory was further divided by their descendants into a multiplicity of independent feudal domains, sometimes united in a league with a Ghibelline orientation. Since 1496 the Marquises of Finale mostly exercised their primacy with the title of "imperial vicar for the marquisates of Savona and Clavesana".

The name Del Carretto is just one of four variants in which the name may appear. The descendants of Henry del Vasto often preferred to sign documents with the only name Carretto or Carretus, without some preposition. Also the version from the cart was used. The most widespread variant in the less recent historiography, however, is of the Carretto, in which the first small letter of the surname seems to denote a provenance from the village of Carretto, fraction of Cairo Montenotte, interpreting and translating the Latin de carreto as an indication of geographical origin (without any documentary confirmation). The spread of this variant is a consequence of a political position consistently followed by the Republic of Genoa for centuries, aiming to disregard to Del Carretto the title of marquises of Savona (which is attested with great frequency in the carretteschi documents, but is completely absent in all treaties between the Republic and Del Carretto). In 1642 Raffaele Della Torre, the famous Genoese politician, invented in his widespread Cyrologia that the name derives from a phantom "marquisate of Carretto" and was therefore proof that the Del Carretto did not descend from Enrico del Vasto, Marquis of Savona. The theory was aimed at denying the Spanish monarchs the right to disembark in the road-stead of Vado and more generally every right on the Savona area. These rights, based on the agreements of Philip II with the last Marquess of Carrara of Finale, had been shortly before reiterated in the investiture of Philip IV of 1639.

== Notable members ==
- Blanche del Carretto (1432–1458), Lady of Monaco by marriage to Catalan, Lord of Monaco
- Carlo Domenico del Carretto (1454–1514), Italian papal legate and Cardinal
- Fabrizio del Carretto (1455–1521), Italian nobleman and the 43rd Grand Master of the Knights Hospitaller
- Ilaria del Carretto (1379–1405), Italian noblewoman and the second wife of Paolo Guinigi
- Jullio del Carretto (died 1614), Italian Roman Catholic Bishop of Casale Monferrato
- Ottone del Carretto (died 1237-42), a patron of troubadours and an imperialist, Italian Margrave of Savona (c.1185–91) and podestà of the Republic of Genoa
- Ottone Enrico Del Carretto (1629-1685), Imperial Army commander and political figure
- Bianca Del Carretto (born 1985), Italian épée fencer

== See also ==
- Alessandria del Carretto, a town and comune in the province of Cosenza in the Calabria region of Italy
