= Marquisate of Finale =

Italian state (967–1797)

Coordinates: 44°10′N 8°19′E

Marquisate of Finale Marchesato di Finale (Italian)
- 967–1797
- Flag Coat of arms

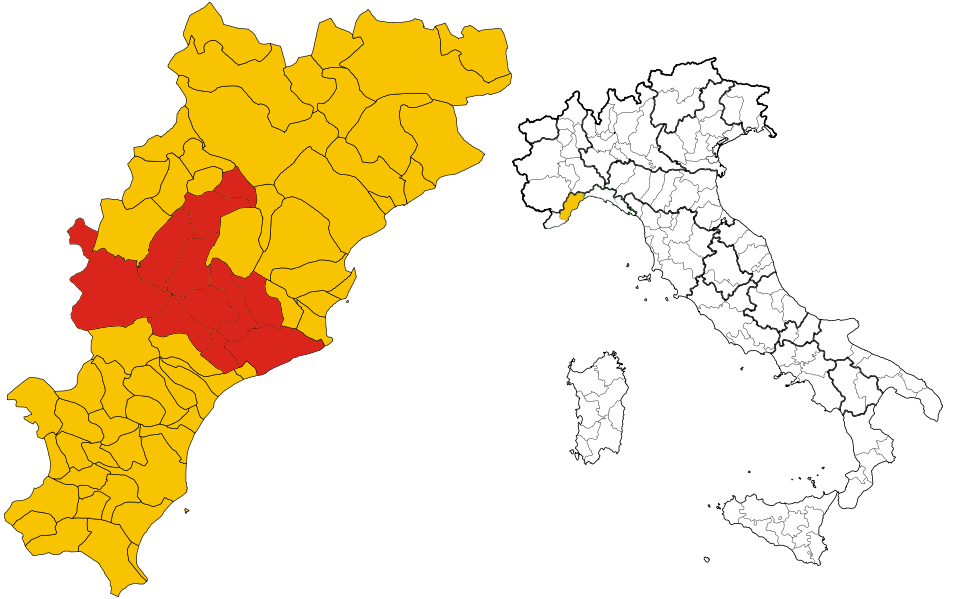
- Marquisate of Finale in Liguria.
- Status: March of the Holy Roman Empire (967–1602); Territory of the Kingdom of Spain (1602–1713); Territory of the Republic of Genoa (1713–1797)
- Capital: Finale Ligure (from the 1190s)
- Common languages: Ligurian
- Religion: Roman Catholicism
- Government: Absolute monarchy (Marquess)
- Marquess
- History
  - Established: 967
  - Acquired by the Kingdom of Spain: 1602
  - Ceded to the Republic of Genoa: 1713
  - Disestablished: 1797
Preceded by	Succeeded by
March of Savona	Ligurian Republic; Kingdom of Spain

The Marquisate of Finale was an Italian state of the Holy Roman Empire in what is now Liguria, part of the former medieval Aleramici March. It was ruled for some six centuries by the Aleramici branch known as marquesses del Vasto (when they also held the March of Savona) and later Del Carretto, when Savona became a free commune. In 1598 the marquisate was sold by its last marquis, Sforza Andrea to Philip II of Spain and in 1713 it was finally ceded to the Republic of Genoa, where it remained so until 1797, when it was invaded by Napoleon, ceasing its existence.

== History ==
The marquisate of Finale originated from the territories donated in 967 to Aleramo of Montferrat by Emperor Otto I and was for centuries a fief of the Holy Roman Empire. Anselmo, son of Aleramo, started the line of the marquesses of Savona or Del Vasto. His descendant Boniface del Vasto acquired large lands in Liguria and southern Piedmont. In 1142-1148 his sons divided its patrimony, creating different feudal dynasties. Enrico I del Carretto inherited the march of Savona, receiving its investiture by Emperor Frederick Barbarossa on 10 June 1162.

The march of Savona stretched on the Ligurian coast from Cogoleto and Finale Ligure up to the Bormida valley, nearly reaching Acqui. Enrico later also acquired Cortemilia and Novello; the family also boasted rights on the diocese of Albenga and the former marquisate of Clavesana. His control over his lands was however rather nominal, due to the increasing autonomy of cities such as Savona, Noli, Alba and Alessandria from the 12th century. The first member of the family to use the title of Marquis of Finale (a village which the family had fortified since around 1193) was Enrico's son, Enrico II Del Carretto. The name "Del Carretto" derived from a small castle on the Bormida river.

Enrico I, Enrico II and his son Giacomo were Ghibellines (pro-imperial): Giacomo married an illegitimate daughter of Frederick II, Caterina da Marano. After his death in 1265, the family's lands were divided between his three sons. One of them, that of Finale, remained independent for three centuries, before it was absorbed by the Kingdom of Spain in 1602. The other two were Millesimo, whose lords later submitted to the Marquisate of Montferrat, and that of Novello, Piedmont. Although their sovereignty had obtained imperial approval, the Del Carretto had to fight for much of their history against the expansion of the Republic of Genoa. In 1385 Genoa obtained the feudal submission of half of the marquisate's lands.

In the 15th century the marquesses remained substantially autonomous, thanks to the support of the Visconti and later the Sforza of Milan. During the Ambrosian Republic, Genoa attacked Finale in a war which lasted from 1447 to 1448, and which ended with the fire of Finalborgo and the complete submission of the marquisate to Genoa. In 1450, however, Giovanni I del Carretto was able to reconquer his capital. Finale remained independent in the 16th century, in which it was a loyal ally of admiral Andrea Doria. Genoa invaded its lands again in 1558, taking advantage of the protests of part of the population due to the economic difficulties caused by the Franco-Spanish war and the harsh government of Alfonso II Del Carretto. After a short return of the marquis, there was another revolt, encouraged by Spain, which wanted to gain control of the only Ligurian port not under the Republic of Genoa. In 1598 the last marquis, Sforza Andrea, sold Finale to Philip II of Spain; the agreement became effective after Sforza Andrea's death in 1602.

At the end of the War of the Spanish Succession, the Marquisate of Finale was ceded to the Republic of Genoa on 20 August 1713, although it kept its statutes until the French Napoleonic invasion in 1797.

== List of rulers ==
Marquis	Reign	Consort(s)	Notes
Enrico I del Carretto	1162–1185	Beatrice di Monferrato	
Enrico II del Carretto	1185–1231	Simona Guercio; Agata de Geneve	
Giacomo del Carretto	1231–1265	Caracosa Doria; Caterina da Marano	
Antonio del Carretto	1265–1313	Agnese di Valperga; Costanza Ciaromonte	
Giorgio del Carretto	1313–1359	Leonora Fieschi	
Lazzarino I del Carretto	1359–1392	Marietta del Carretto	
Lazzarino II del Carretto	1392–1412	Caterina del Carretto	
Galeotto I del Carretto	1412–1450	Vannina Adorno	in exile after 5 February 1449
Giovanni I del Carretto	1450–1468	Viscontina Adorno	in power from 20 December 1450
Galeotto II del Carretto	1468–1482	Elisabetta Dal Verme	
Alfonso I del Carretto	1482–1499	Bianca Simonetta; Peretta Cybo-Usodimare	first time
Carlo Domenico del Carretto	1499–1514		also a cardinal
Alfonso I del Carretto	1514–1517	Bianca Simonetta; Peretta Cybo-Usodimare	second time
Giovanni II del Carretto	1517–1535	Ginevra Bentivoglio	
Alfonso II del Carretto	1535–1583		his mother, Peretta Cybo-Usodimare, and uncle, Marcantonio Del Carretto Doria, exercised a regency (1535–46); Alfonso II exercises power (1546–58) marquisate occupied by Genoa (1558–64); Giovanni Alberto Del Carretto di Gorzegno rules in Alfonso II's name (1564–66) marquisate ruled by imperial commissioners (1566–1602) occupied by Spanish or German troops (1571–1602)
Alessandro del Carretto	1583–1596		also abbot of Buonacomba in exile throughout his reign marquisate ruled by imperial commissioners (1566–1602) occupied by Spanish or German troops (1571–1602)
Sforza Andrea del Carretto	1596–1602	Faustina Sforza di Caravaggio	in exile throughout his reign marquisate ruled by imperial commissioners (1566–1602) occupied by Spanish or German troops (1571–1602)
Filippo I d'Asburgo	1602–1621	Margherita d'Austria-Stiria	received imperial investiture on 4 February 1619
Filippo II d'Asburgo	1621–1665	Elisabetta di Borbone	received imperial investiture on 19 February 1639
Carlo d'Asburgo	1665–1700	Maria Luisa di Borbone; Maria Anna del Palatinato-Neuburg	
