= Aleramici =

Medieval Italian noble family

Aleramids Sovereign Marquises of Western Liguria
- Arms of the senior branch of the Aleramici of Savona. A similar variation occurs in the junior line of Montferrat.
- Parent house: unknown
- Country: Holy Roman Empire; Eastern Roman Empire; Latin Empire; Kingdom of Jerusalem; Kingdom of Thessalonica; Kingdom of Sicily; Republic of Genoa
- Origin: Frankish
- Founded: c.961; 1065 years ago
- Founder: Aleramo I
- Final ruler: Sforza-Andrea del Carretto
- Historic seat: Savona
- Titles: Caesar of the Eastern Roman Empire; Empress consort of the Eastern Roman Empire; Empress consort of the Latin Empire; King of Jerusalem; Queen of Jerusalem; King of Thessalonica; Queen consort of Sicily; Prince of Galilee; Prince of Trabia; Prince of Butera; Prince of Campofiorito; Prince of Pietraperzia; Prince of Scalea; Prince of Scordia; Duke of Camastra; Marquis of Western Liguria; Marquis of Savona; Marquis of Montferrat; Marquis of Saluzzo; Marquis of Finale; Marquis of Bosco; Marquis of Sezzadio; Marquis of Occimiano; Marquis of Incisa; Marquis of Ceva; Marquis of Busca; Marquis of Clavesana; Marquis of Ponzone; Marquis of Albisola; Marquis of Varazze; Marquis of Grana; Count of Millesimo; Sovereign Patrician of Genoa; others
- Connected families: Anscarids Obertenghi Arduinici
- Dissolution: extant
- Deposition: 1602; 424 years ago
- Cadet branches: House of Carretto; House of Lanza; others

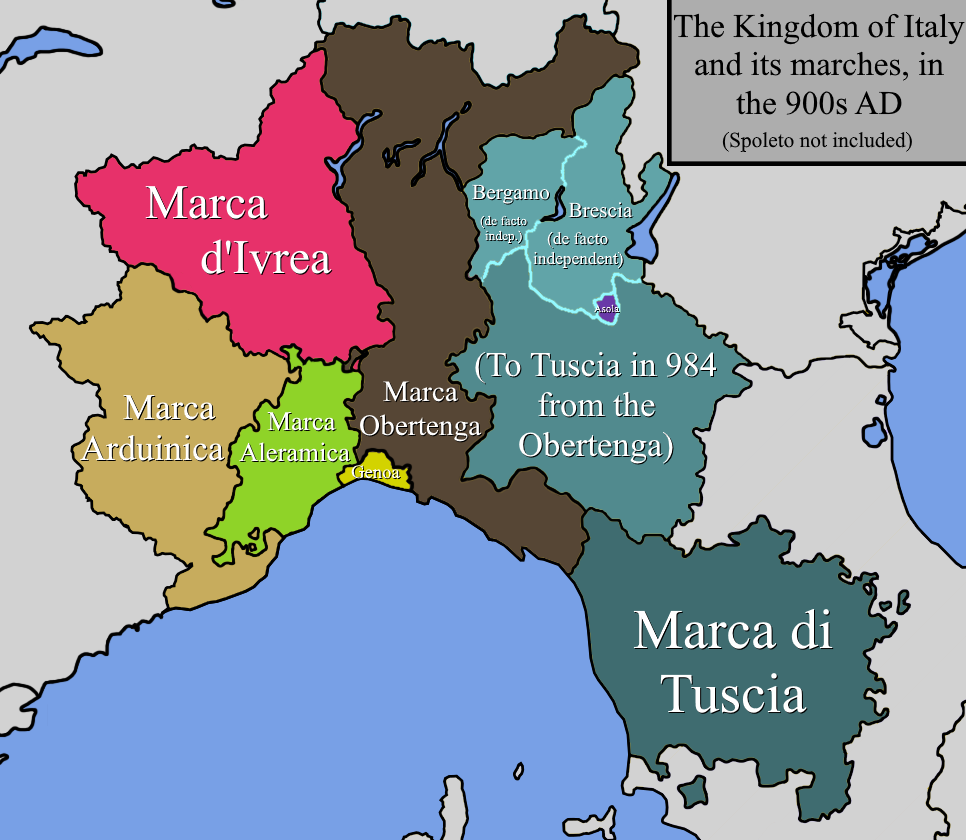
The five imperial Marches of Italy: Marca Aleramica, Marca Arduinica, Marca Anscarica (also d'Invrea), Marca Obertenga, and Marca di Tuscia (or Tuscany) founded in the 10th century.

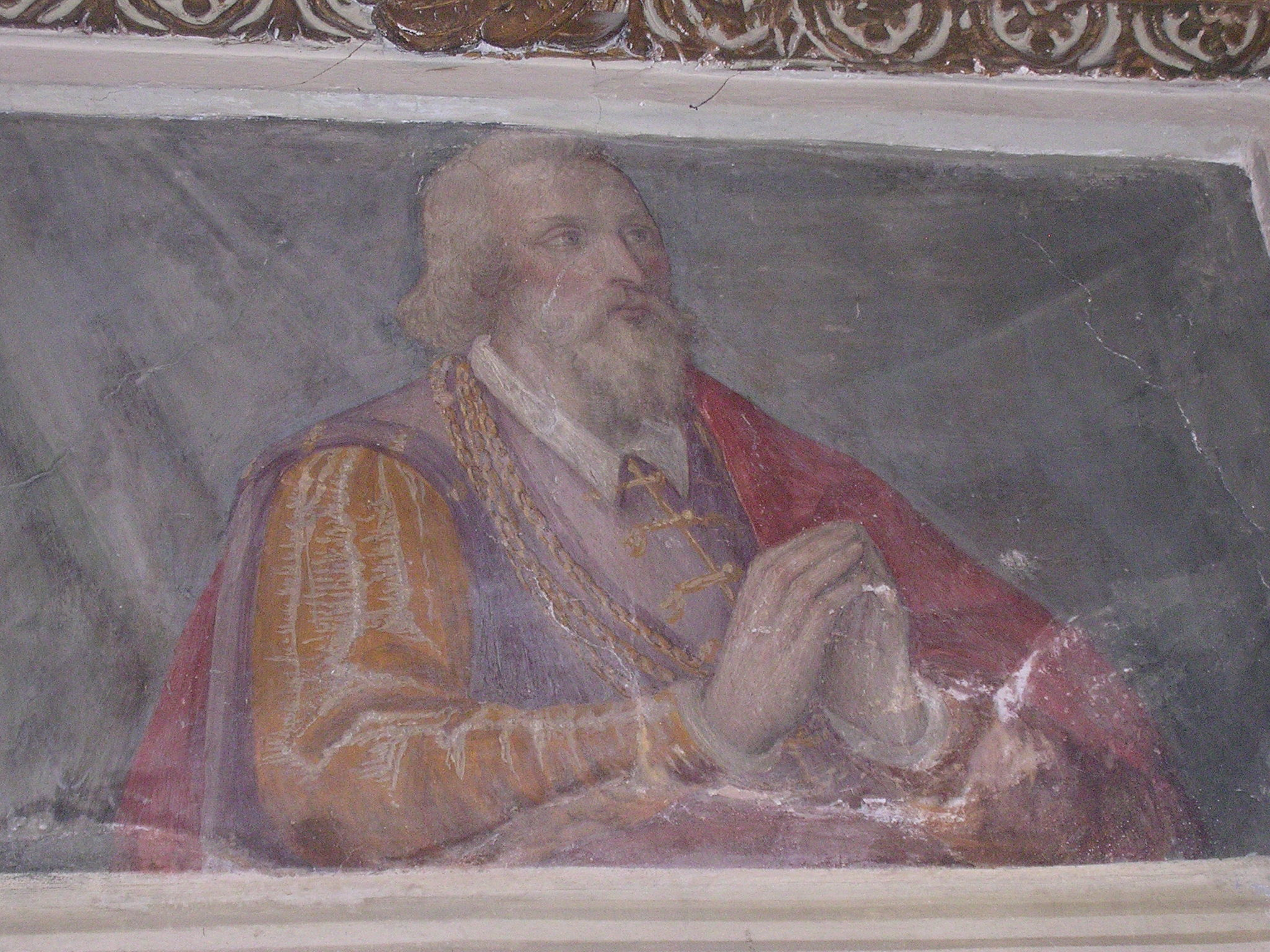
Imagined portrait of Aleramo in the Abbey of Grazzano (16th century)

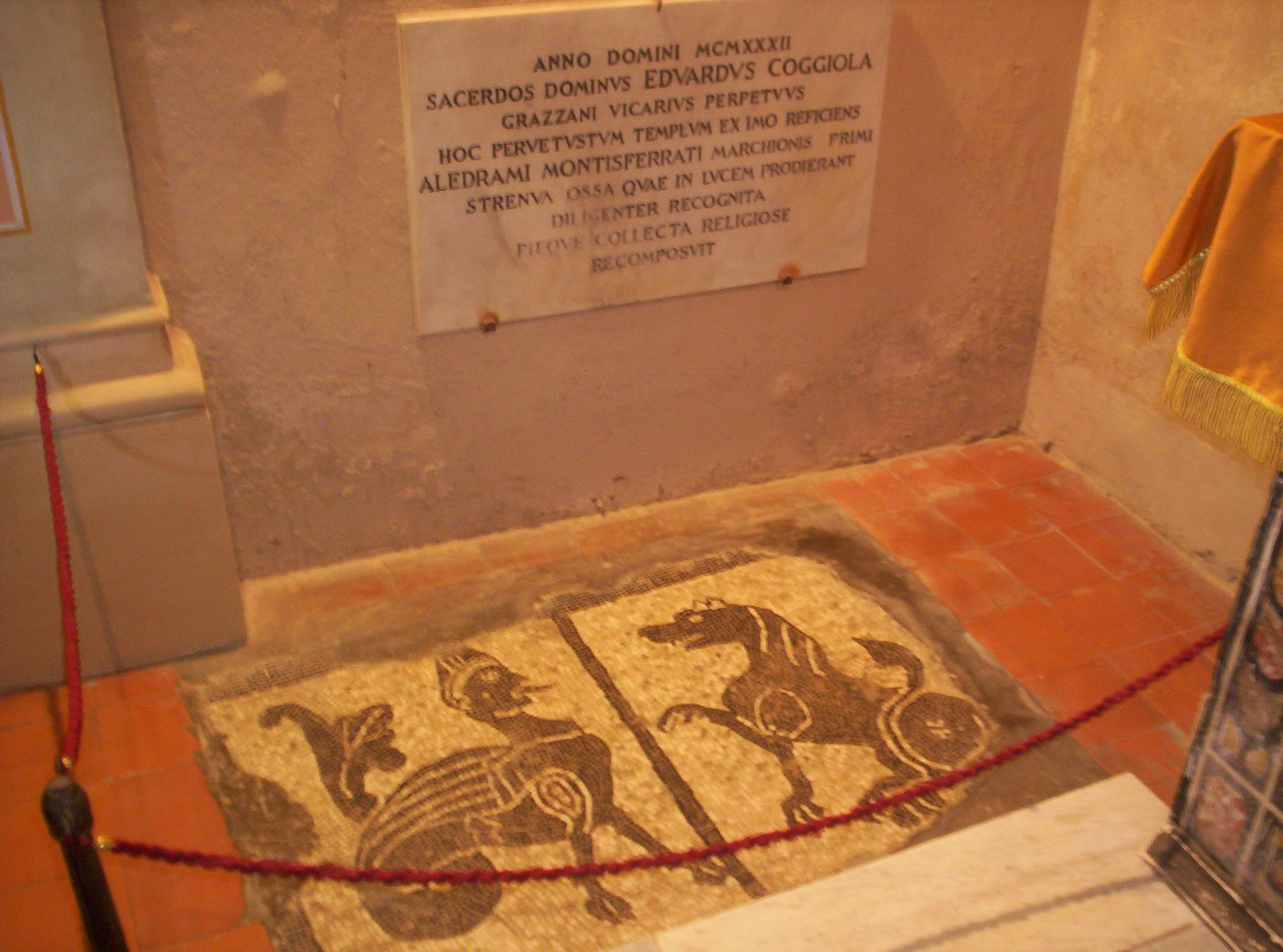
Carolingian mosaic in the tomb of Aleramo in the Abbey of Grazzano

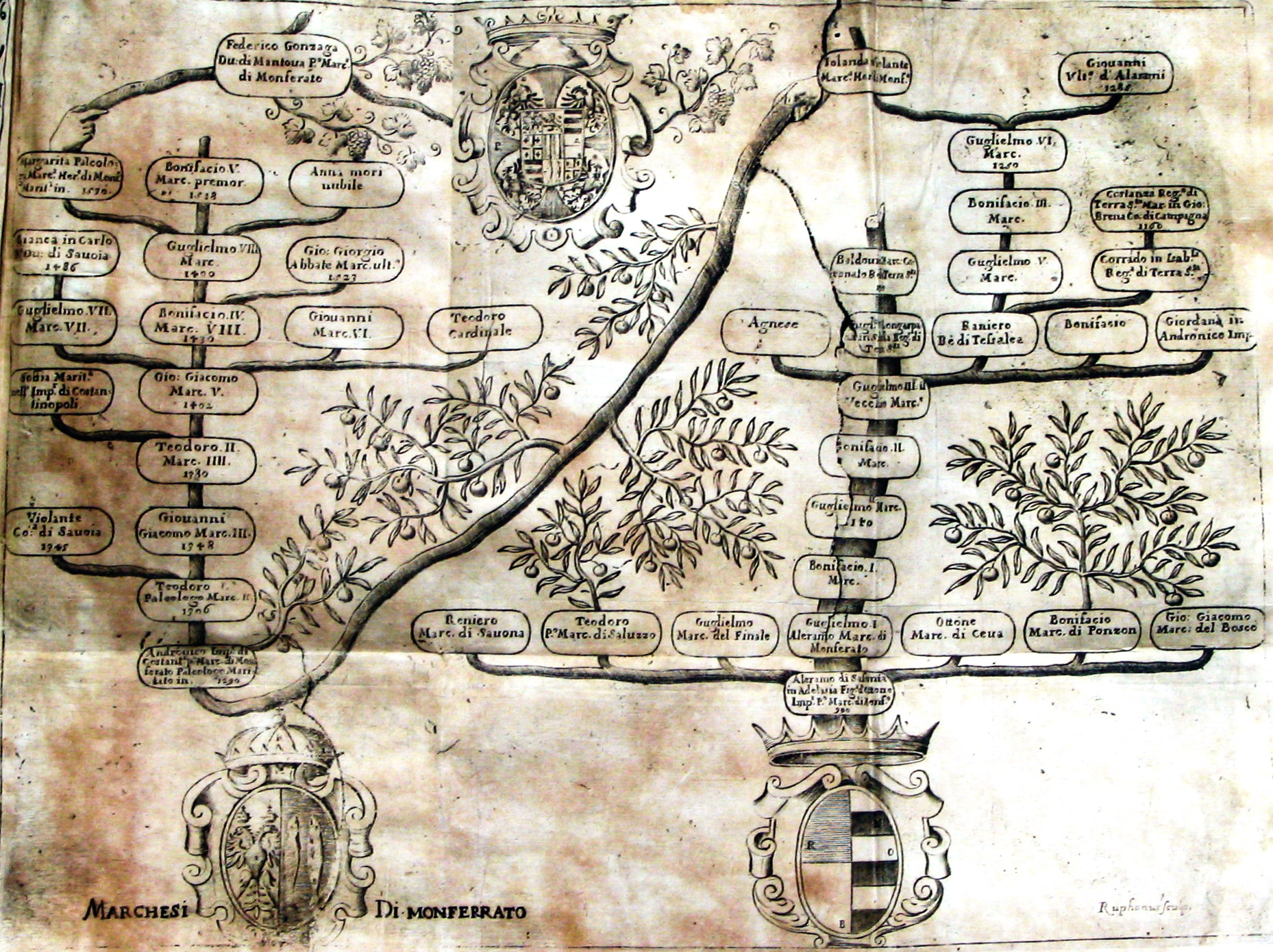
17th century family tree (imprecise) of different Aleramid branches and their succession through the Palaiologos to the House of Gonzaga

The Aleramici (also Aleramids) were a Northern Italian princely and royal dynasty of Frankish origin. They ruled over various northwestern Italian principalities in Piedmont and Liguria from the 10th to the 17th century, as well as over the Kingdoms of Jerusalem and Thessalonica from the 12th to the 13th century.

Considered one of the foremost crusader dynasties, the Aleramids notably extended their influence across the Eastern Mediterranean, thrice appointed as successors to the Eastern Roman Imperial throne (under the title of Caesar), without ever ensuring their effective installation. They nevertheless produced two Imperial consorts, one of which (Irene) effectively ruled over part of the Empire under the title of Augusta. Other females of the dynasty also appear as consort-regents in several European states.

The Aleramids were only later named as such by historians seeking to identify the extensive lineage derived from the Frankish Count Aleramo, proclaimed first sovereign Marquis (or Markgrave) of Western Liguria by the Emperor Otto the Great in the year 967. Further research has allowed the division of the lineage into two main branches: the senior Marquises of Savona (later surnamed del Vasto), and the junior Marquises of Monferrat. The last became extinct during the 14th century in the Empress Irene (with female succession in the House of Palaiologos-Montferrat). The senior line of Savona carried on through multiple descending branches, mainly ruling over the Marquisates of Saluzzo and Finale until the 17th century.

Broadly, their decadence in Northern Italy can be linked to the communal movement and the consecutive loss of Imperial dominance in the region in favor of Papal or Ecclesiastical rule (12th century). By the 13th century the Aleramids had lost most of their territorial sovereignty in favor of the Republic of Genoa and the Duchy of Milan. Some late exponents (mainly del Carretto) appear as vassal-lords to the Dukes of Milan and of Savoy, while others became sovereign patricians of the Republic of Genoa. Several others (mainly Lanza) relocated to the Kingdom of Sicily where they continued to exercise a notable influence. One branch (Grana) remained in service of the Holy Roman Empire until their extinction in the 18th century (with female succession in the House of Arenberg).

The Aleramids are ancestors (through female lines) of most European royal families.

== History ==
=== Count William I ===
The oldest known member of the lineage was the Frankish Count William (or Willelmus), first mentioned as the father of Aleramo in the year 951. He is thought to have been the same Count Wilhelmus indicated as "dilectissimi fideles" (very beloved faithful) of the Kings Hugh of Italy and Rudolph II of Burgondy in the year 924, as well as the same Frankish Count Wilhelmus who, according to the Gesta Berengarii Imperatoris, crossed the Alps at the head of 300 Frankish knights in the year 888 in aid of Guy III of Spoleto during his quest for the Iron Crown. Although it is not clear which were the specific territories that he inherited to his son, an Imperial charter of the year 967 suggests that William passed down a substantial patrimony dispersed through the Carolingian Kingdom of Italy ("tam de hereditate parentum quam de acquistu illi advenientes per diversa loca infra Italicum Regnum coniacentes").

=== Aleramo I, First Marquis of Western Liguria ===
Aleramo, who identified himself as a member of the Salic nation and follower of the Salic law ("ex Natione Vivere et Legge Salica") received from King Hugh of Italy a similar treatment as his father ("fideli nostro Aledramo Comiti"), extending his domains in the Piedmont and Western Liguria through different donations occurred between 933 and 938 (still appearing under the rank of Count). It is still undetermined who was Aleramo's first wife and mother of all three of his children, considered by Jacob of Acqui (14th century) to be a certain princess Adelasia, daughter of the Emperor Otto the Great. Acqui's fanciful story gave rise to a much extended myth regarding Aleramo's legendary origins and unproven imperial marriage (further extended in the 19th century by Giosuè Carducci's "Cavalry and Humanism"). Aleramo's second marriage nonetheless proves his insertion amongst the Anscarids, one of Medieval Europe's most prestigious royal dynasties. Shortly after the ascent of Berengar II to the throne of Italy, Aleramo married the princess Gerberga, the King's daughter. In the year 961, Gerberga is mentioned as stepmother ("maternia") to Aleramo's children, themselves styled stepchildren ("filiastri"), and thus known to have proceeded from his previous marriage. In the same charter Aleramo is first mentioned as Marquis (“Aledramus Marchio, filius Guilielmi Comitis, et Gilberga filia domini Berengarii Regis"), suggesting the importance of the marriage in the concession of his new rank. On 10 April 967 the Emperor Otto the Great issued a charter confirming Aleramo in all his domains, counties and jurisdictional courts, alongside the then princely title of Marquis, as petitioned by the Empress consort Adelaide, daughter of Rudolph II ("Aledramum Marchionem interventu ac petitione Adhelaydae nostra coniugis atque imperii nostri participis").

=== The first Aleramici ===
Since 967, the Aleramici (name later given by historians to identify the numerous branches of Aleramo's lineage) preserved their forefather's territories alongside the title of Marquis, or Margrave in the Holy Roman Empire. According to Salic Law, the Frank's fiefdoms had to be either shared or equally divided amongst male descendants, leading to the fragmentation of the Aleramid's power and their forefather's principality. As evident in the foundational charter of the Abbey of Grazzano (year 961), Aleramo's firstborn son (William II) died in youth without having produced any offspring ("quondam Gulielmo, que fuit filius noster"), while the third-born, Otto I, also died before his father but did managed to produce two boys. After Aleramo's death around the year 999, his second-born, Anselm I took his father's place as sole head of the entire Western Ligurian March. The first testimony of his succession is found in the foundational charter of the Abbey of San Quentin in Spigno (year 999) where Anselm, son of the late Aleramo, is first mentioned as Marquis alongside his wife Gisla, daughter of Albert I of Milan ("Anselmus Marchio, filius bonae memoriae Aledrami intemque Marchio, et Gisla Comitissa iugalibus, filia Adalberti similique Marchioque"). The same charter also mentions his nephews William III and Riprand, sons of his deceased brother Otto I ("Wielelmus et Riprandus germanis, fili bonae memoriae Oddoni").

=== The Marches of Savona and Monferrat ===
Even after Anselm I's death, the sovereignty of the entire March was shared between his children and their junior cousins (sons of his brother Otto I). The two lines (Anselmian and Ottonian) ultimately established themselves in two distinct counties which became the center of their respective jurisdictional courts. The senior branch (Anselm's) took seat in the Ligurian port of Savona, while the junior branch (Otto's) did so in the Piedmontese castle of Casale Monferrato, leading to the distinction of the Aleramids between the Anselmian Marquises of Savona and the Ottonian Marquises of Monferrat. Despite this nominal division, both branches continued sharing sovereignty over the entire March and effectively possessing fiefdoms in each other's jurisdictions at least until the 13th century.

The abundant procreation of males amongst the Aleramids led to the continuous fragmentation of the original March (in accordance to Salic Law), and the subdivision of both Marches (particularly that of Savona) into smaller jurisdictions presided by the different members of the lineage (all preserving the princely rank of Marquis). The junior Ottonian branch was only divided into the Marches of Monferrat and Occimiano (conferred to a junior line later surnamed "Camar"), while the Anselmian line initially formed the three extensive Marches of Savona, Bosco and Sezzadio. The Aleramids of Sezzadio soon became extinct, and their territory returned to their most immediate agnatic relatives of Savona and Bosco. By the 12th century, the surviving Anselmians (Savona and Bosco) had also distinguished their respective lines by the adoption of the surnames del Vasto and del Bosco. The senior Aleramids del Vasto (descendants of Otto III of Savona) formed the Marquisates of Savona, of Finale, Dego, Incisa, Loreto, Cortemilia, Ceva and Clavesana (later adding Saluzzo, and Busca through the Arduinic inheritance of the lower-half of the March of Turin). The successive Marquises of Savona later abandoned the surname del Vasto and instead took the surname del Carretto. The junior Anselmian Aleramids del Bosco (descendants of Ugo II of Bosco) formed the Marquisates of Bosco, Ponzone, Albisola, Varazze, Ussecio and Pareto.

Heraldry of the Aleramid branches

Primitive heraldry of the Anselmian Aleramids del Vasto and del Bosco

Primitive heraldry of the Ottonian Aleramids del Monferrato and Occimiano

Later heraldry of the Anselmian Aleramids del Carretto

Later heraldry of the Anselmian Aleramidsdi Ceva

Later heraldry of the Anselmian Aleramidsdi Ponzone

=== Influence across the Mediterranean ===
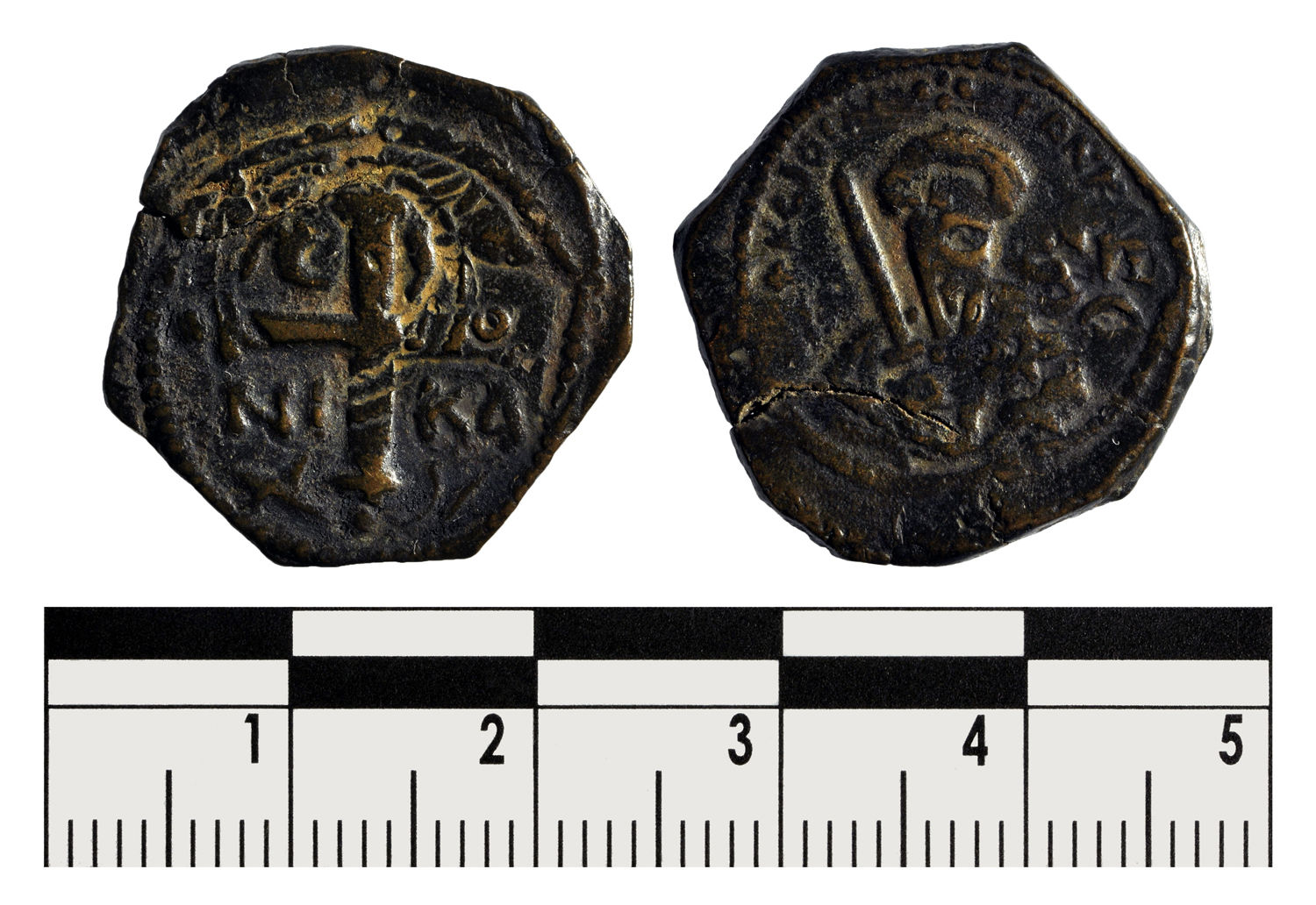
Coin issued by Tancred of Galilee as prince-regent of Antioch

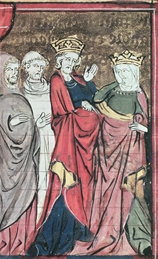
Repudiation of Queen Adelaide del Vasto by King Baldwin I

Despite their constant territorial division, the Aleramids managed to maintain control over the lower-half of the Piedmont and the Western flank of the Ligurian Bay, forming powerful alliances with other Italian ruling houses (mainly Anscarids, Arduinids, Obertenghi and Hauteville) and even extending their alliances with further European dynasties (mainly the Capetians and the Hohenstaufens). The senior branch of Savona gained notable influence during the 11th century through successive marriages with the Norman ruling dynasty of Sicily, the House of Hauteville. Firstly was the marriage between Odo the Good Marquis and Emma of Hauteville (daughter of Robert Guiscard), shortly followed by that of Adelaide to Count Roger I of Sicily (later to King Baldwin I of Jerusalem) while her brother Enrico, married Flandina (daughter of the said Roger through a previous marriage). As such, it was the senior Anselmian line of Savona the first to gain considerable influence in the Crusades, most notably through the leadership Tancred, Prince of Galilee, and later through the short queenship of his cousin Adelaide in Jerusalem. The Anselmians also augmented their territories in Northern Italy after the extinction of the Arduinids, inheriting the northern half of the March of Turin to the House of Savoy (through Adelaide of Susa), and the lower half to the Aleramics (through her sister Bertha of Turin). This territorial expansion, alongside the crusader links, allowed Boniface I del Vasto (uncle of Tranced of Galilee and Queen Adelaide) to marry the Capetian princess Agnes of Vermandois, daughter of Hugh I and granddaughter of King Henry I of the Franks.

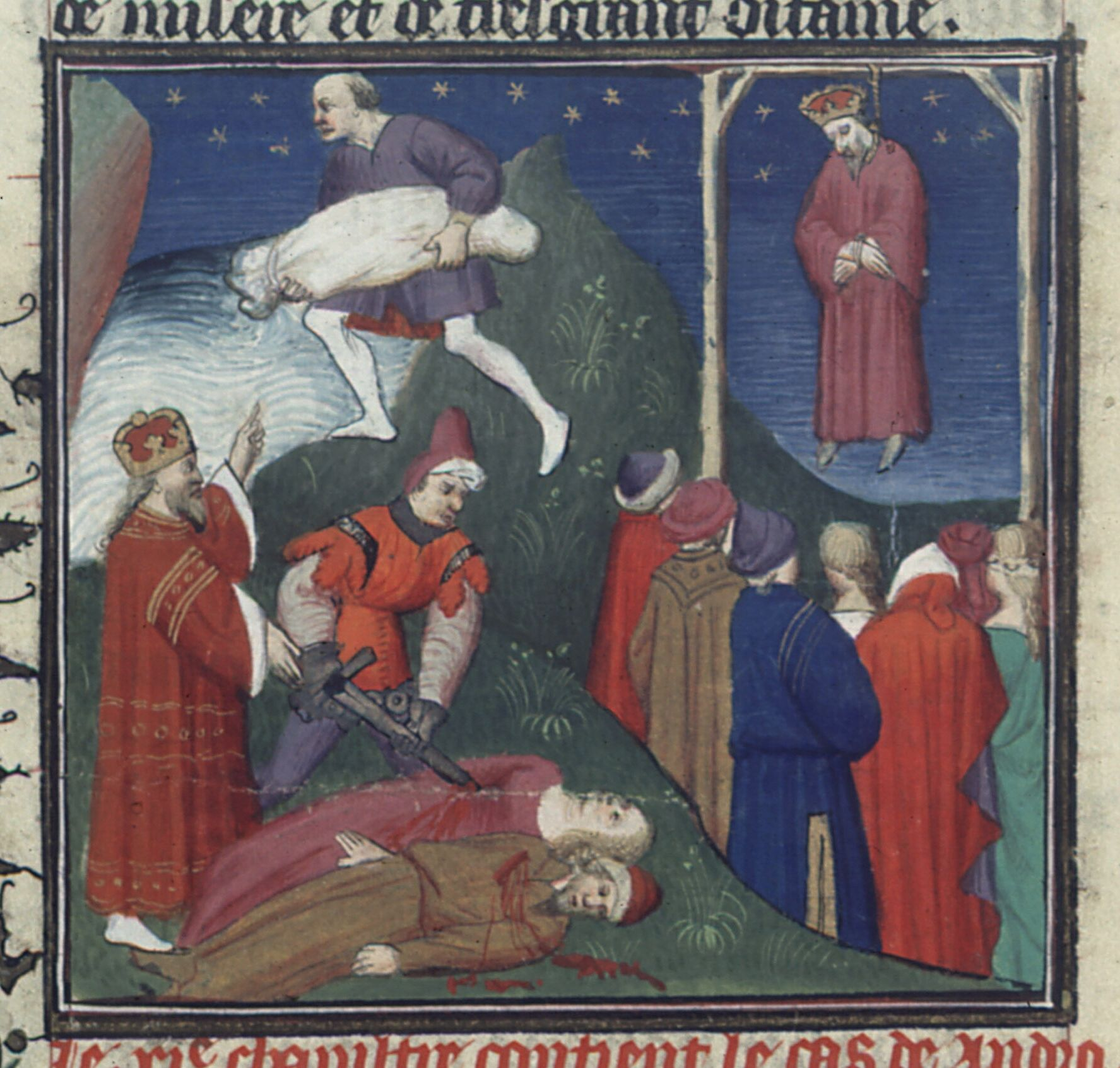
Andronikos I Komnenos ordering the murder of his cousin Maria Komnene and her Aleramid husband Caesar Rainier

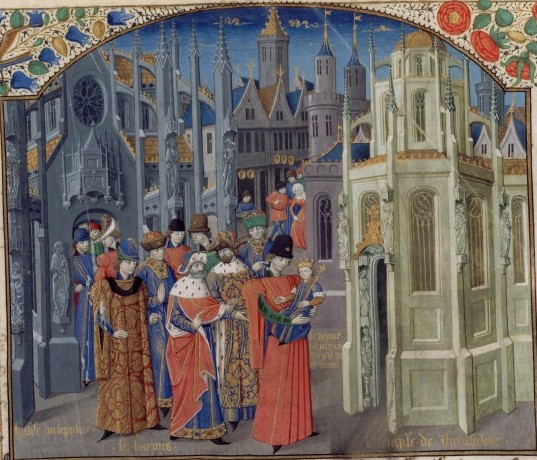
Bailian of Ibelin carrying the Aleramid Baldwin V to his coronation as King of Jerusalem

The junior or Ottonian branch of Monferrato shortly followed their senior relative's involvement in the Crusades, also employing a strong marriage policy to augment their influence. At the time his cousin Adelaide was regent of Sicily, Rainier I of Monferrat secured his own marriage to Gisela of Burgundy, daughter of William I, and sister to Pope Calixtus II. Their son William V of Monferrat then married Judith of Austria, daughter of Leopold III and half-sister of Frederick II of Swabia (father of Emperor Barbarossa) and of Emperor Conrad III. This strong and consolidated insertion amongst Europe's foremost royal families allowed the marriage of Rainier II of Monferrat to Maria Komnene, oldest daughter of Eastern Emperor Manuel I Komnenos, obtaining for the first time the imperial title of Caesar, bestowed upon the appointed successors of the Imperial throne. The rebellion of Andronikos I Komnenos led to the assassination of his cousin Maria and the Caesar Rainier, ending the first Aleramid attempt at securing the Easter Roman Imperial throne.

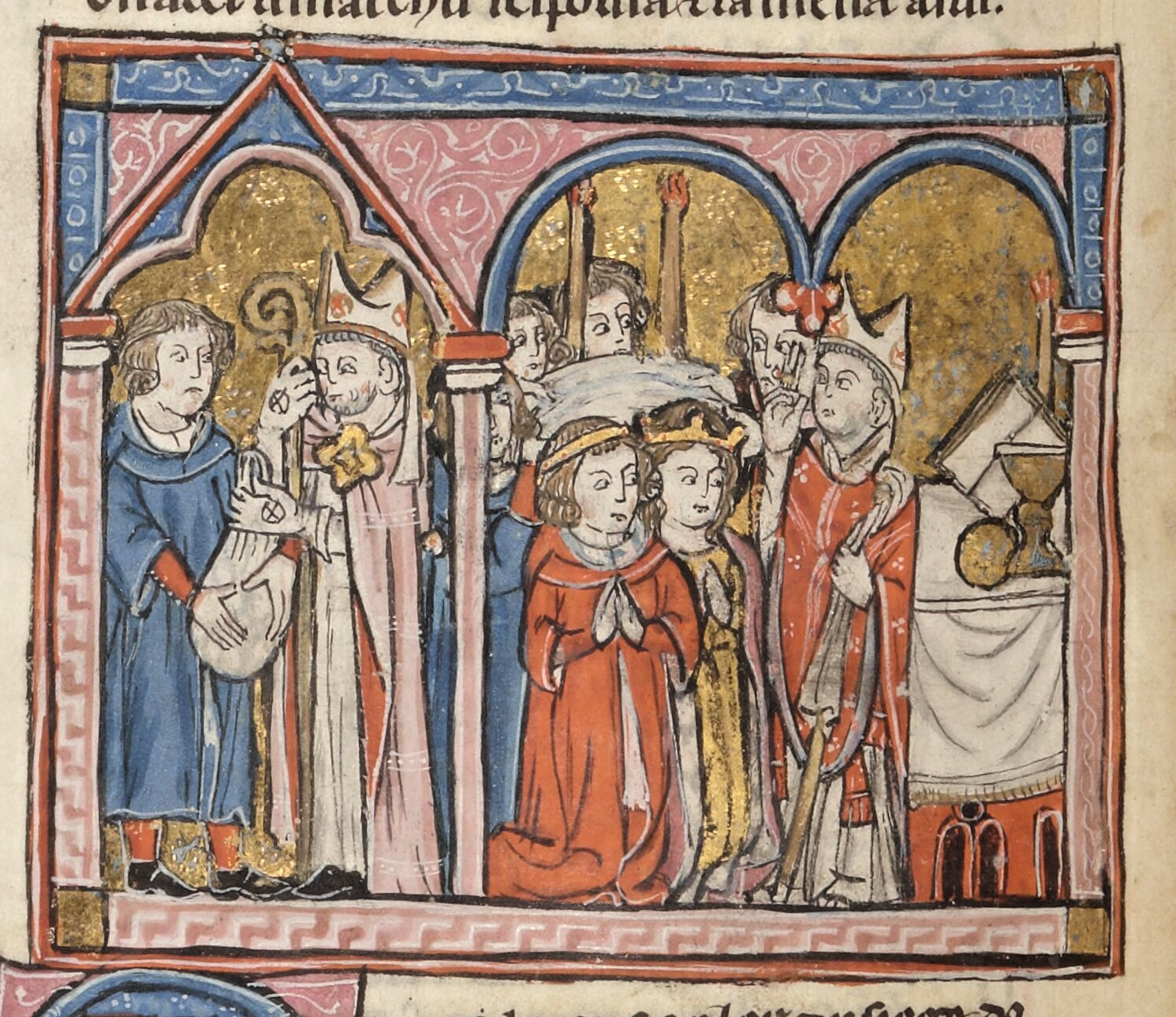
Conrad's marriage to Isabella of Jerusalem

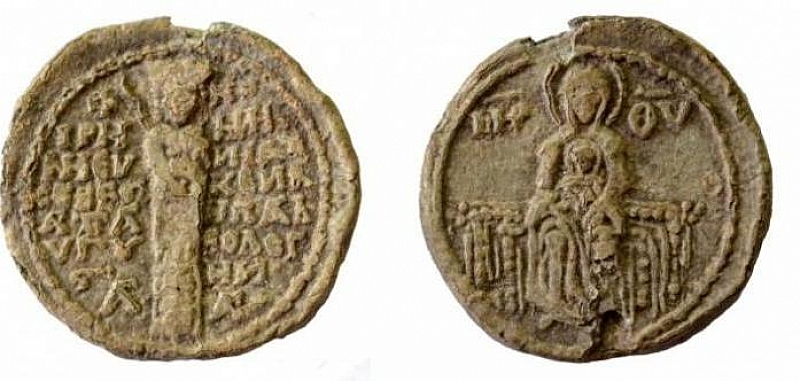
Imperial seal of Irene of Monferrat, Empress of the Romans and Augusta of Tessalonica

Rainier's brother, William the Longsword, later married Sybilla of Anjou, successor to her brother Baldwin the Leper's rights in the throne of Jerusalem (which she passed down to their son, Baldwin V, first Aleramid monarch in his own right). Conrad of Monferrat (William and Rainier's brother) firstly married Theodora Angelina, sister of the then childless Emperor Isaac II Angelos, obtaining the proclamation of successor to Isaac's throne and given, like his brother, the imperial rank of Caesar. The harsh anti-Latin sentiment at the Imperial court and his brother Rainier's previous experience, led Conrad to flee Constantinople and arrive by surprise to the city of Acre, from where he launched a strong campaign against Saladin's troops. Conrad soon became the preferred leader of the crusaders and strongest opponent to Guy de Lusignan's controversial rule. He married Isabella I (Sybilla and Baldwin the Leper's sister), effectively reigning over Jerusalem as King-consort, and then as elected-King in 1192, but assassinated shortly afterwards (allegedly by Hashasin hitmen contracted by Richard the Lionheart). His daughter Maria of Monferrat, successively became Queen of Jerusalem after the regency of her stepfather Aimery of Lusignan, becoming the last Aleramid to reign over Jerusalem in their own right. Her daughter, Queen Isabella II of Jerusalem became Holy Roman Empress after her marriage to Frederick II.

A fourth brother, Boniface I, was elected leader of the Fourth Crusade, effectively taking Constantinople from Alexios III in 1204 and founding the Latin Empire that said year. According to contemporary chronicles, Boniface was received by both the clergy and the Eastern Roman people as their new Emperor (Basileus) but was never crowned, having to face an internal rebellion that led to the crowning of Henry I of Flanders as first Latin Emperor, successively married to Agnes of Monferrat, Boniface's daughter, to ensure peace. Following the agreement Boniface managed to ensure his rights over the imperial territory of Thessalonica (already offered to his brothers), and receiving the rank of King. He died shortly afterwards while confronting a raid of Bulgarian rebels. Adelasia or Azalaïs, sister of the previous, married her Anselmian cousin Manfredo II of Saluzzo, and became regent of Saluzzo until her grandson Manfred III's coming of age. Perhaps a sister or daughter of Boniface was Beatrice of Monferrat, firstly married to the Dauphin Guigues V of Albon (and mother of the Dauphine Beatrice, Duchess of Burgundy), successively marrying her Anselmian cousin Henry I del Carretto, Marquis of Savona. Her grandson Guigues VI married another Beatrice of Monferrat, often confused with the previous.

Later that century, Yolande, Boniface's great-great-granddaughter, married Emperor Andronikos II Palaiologos, taking the Greek name of Irene, and effectively ruling over her paternal fiefdoms in Tessalonica under the title of Augusta. After the death of her brother John I in 1305, her son prince Theodore Palaiologos was appointed Marquis of Monferrat in contradiction of the Salic Law still practiced by the Aleramics until then (as upheld by the Anselmian Manfred IV of Saluzzo who reclaimed the Marquisate for himself). The succession was later confirmed by the Holy Roman Emperor Henry VII, who preferred to include a Byzantine prince amongst his subjects rather than to further the empowerment of an already subjected prince. A falsified charter in favor of John I was used by the Emperor to legitimize his decision.

=== Imperial decline and Papal rise ===
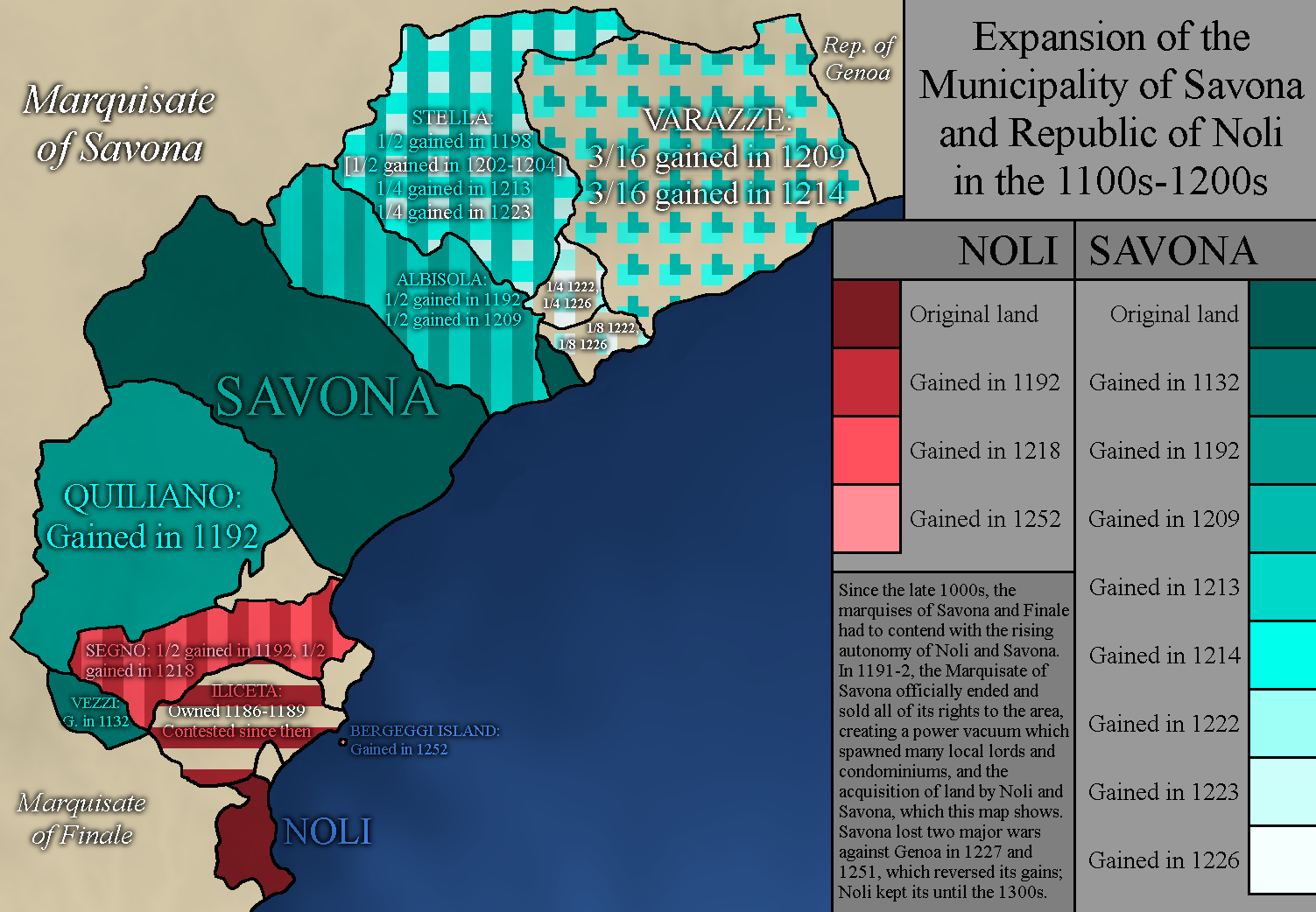
Advance of the Communes of Noli and Savona through the Aleramic Marquisates of Savona and Varazze during the 12th and 13th centuries.

The expansion of the Aleramids through the Mediterranean coincided (or rather

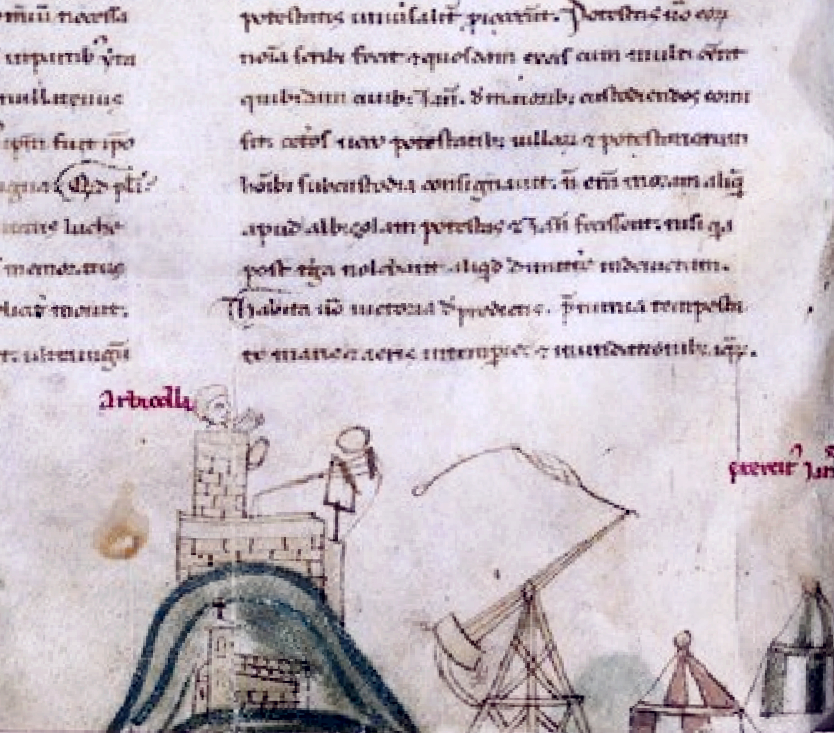
Siege of the Aleramid Castle of Albisola by Genoese troops in 1227 (Annales Ianuenses, Bibliothèque Nationale de France).

followed) the demise of Imperial dominance over Northern Italy. Since the 11th century, the papacy disputed increasing powers previously attributed to secular/Imperial rule (see Investiture Controversy), and in the following century the country became entrenched in violence between the opposing factions of Guelphs and Ghibellines (the first supporting further advancement of Ecclesiastical dominance through communal rule, while the latter supporting the continuation of secular/Imperial dominance through princely rule). It is not surprising that the Aleramids mainly fought for the ghibelline/Imperial faction, despite some of the less powerful branches (mainly del Bosco and Occimiano) soon surrendering to the overwhelming Guelph advancement. The Aleramid city of Alessandria (a shared fiefdom of the Marquises of Monferrat and Bosco) became the main stronghold of papal/Guelph forces after the destruction of Milan decreed in the Diet of Roncaglia. Between Emperor Frederick I Barbarossa's initial defeat at the Battle of Legnano (1176), and Emperor Frederick II's final defeat at the Battle of Parma (1248), the Alermids had lost control of most of the March of Savona (except for Finale), continuously yielding in favor of the Lombard League. During the 13th century, the coastal Marquisate of Varazze became the main stage of the violent conflicts between the Republic of Genoa (Guelphs) and the Comune of Savona (Ghbellines).

Only the Marquises of Monferrat, Finale and Saluzzo, managed to outlive the conflict, awaiting the soon-following decline of papal-communal rule, and the consecutive rise of the Signoria. Most other surviving Aleramids (all Anselmian) retained reduced control of smaller fiefdoms, acting as vassal-lords to the Dukes of Milan and of Savoy, and specially to the Republic of Genoa. Through several agreements many Aleramids were granted Genoese citizenship, allowing them considerable preeminences, including preserving their princely rank as sovereign patricians of La Superba.

== Rulers of the Aleramid dynasty ==
=== Aleramid dynasty ===
Partitions of Liguria under Aleramid rule

Marquisate of Liguria (924-991)
Marquisate of Western Liguria (991-1125)
Marquisate of Western Liguria (991-1125)							Marquisate of Occimiano (991-1275)
Marquisate of Western Liguria (991-1125)					Marquisate of Rocchetta (1084-1203)	Marquisate of Eastern Liguria; Evolved as: Marquisate of Montferrat (991-1306)	Marquisate of Occimiano (991-1275)
Marquisate of Busca (Lancia branch) (1125-1281)	Marquisate of Ceva (1125-1313)	Marquisate of Clavesana (1125-1385)	Marquisate of Finale (Del Carretto branch) (1125-1566)		Marquisate of Rocchetta (1084-1203)	Marquisate of Eastern Liguria; Evolved as: Marquisate of Montferrat (991-1306)	Marquisate of Occimiano (991-1275)
Marquisate of Busca (Lancia branch) (1125-1281)	Marquisate of Ceva (1125-1313)	Marquisate of Clavesana (1125-1385)	Marquisate of Finale (Del Carretto branch) (1125-1566)		Marquisate of Incisa (1125-1548)	Marquisate of Eastern Liguria; Evolved as: Marquisate of Montferrat (991-1306)	Marquisate of Occimiano (991-1275)
Evolved as: Marquisate of Saluzzo (Del Vasto branch) (1125-1548)	Marquisate of Ceva (1125-1313)	Marquisate of Clavesana (1125-1385)	Marquisate of Finale (Del Carretto branch) (1125-1566)		Marquisate of Incisa (1125-1548)
Evolved as: Marquisate of Saluzzo (Del Vasto branch) (1125-1548)	Marquisate of Ceva (1125-1313)	Marquisate of Clavesana (1125-1385)	Marquisate of Finale (Del Carretto branch) (1125-1566)		Marquisate of Incisa (1125-1548)	Inherited by Palaiologos dynasty (1306-1536)
Evolved as: Marquisate of Saluzzo (Del Vasto branch) (1125-1548)	Acquired by the House of Savoy	Marquisate of Clavesana (1125-1385)	Marquisate of Finale (Del Carretto branch) (1125-1566)		Marquisate of Incisa (1125-1548)	Inherited by Palaiologos dynasty (1306-1536)
Evolved as: Marquisate of Saluzzo (Del Vasto branch) (1125-1548)	Acquired by the House of Savoy	Divided between the House of Savoy, the Marquisate of Finale and the Genoese Republic	Marquisate of Finale (Del Carretto branch) (1125-1566)		Marquisate of Incisa (1125-1548)	Inherited by Palaiologos dynasty (1306-1536)
Evolved as: Marquisate of Saluzzo (Del Vasto branch) (1125-1548)	Acquired by the House of Savoy	Divided between the House of Savoy, the Marquisate of Finale and the Genoese Republic		Marquisate of Zuccarello (Del Carretto branch) (1412-1631)	Marquisate of Incisa (1125-1548)	Inherited by Palaiologos dynasty (1306-1536)
Evolved as: Marquisate of Saluzzo (Del Vasto branch) (1125-1548)	Acquired by the House of Savoy	Divided between the House of Savoy, the Marquisate of Finale and the Genoese Republic		Marquisate of Zuccarello (Del Carretto branch) (1412-1631)	Marquisate of Incisa (1125-1548)	Inherited by the House of Gonzaga (from 1536)
Evolved as: Marquisate of Saluzzo (Del Vasto branch) (1125-1548)	Acquired by the House of Savoy	Divided between the House of Savoy, the Marquisate of Finale and the Genoese Republic		Marquisate of Zuccarello (Del Carretto branch) (1412-1631)	Inherited by the House of Gonzaga
Annexed to France	Acquired by the House of Savoy	Divided between the House of Savoy, the Marquisate of Finale and the Genoese Republic	Annexed to Spain	Marquisate of Zuccarello (Del Carretto branch) (1412-1631)	Inherited by the House of Gonzaga
Annexed to France	Acquired by the House of Savoy	Divided between the House of Savoy, the Marquisate of Finale and the Genoese Republic	Annexed to Spain	Annexed to the Genoese Republic	Inherited by the House of Gonzaga

Table of rulers

Ruler	Born	Reign	Ruling part	Consort	Death	Notes
Guglielmo I	c.900?	924 – 933	Marquisate of Liguria	Unknown one child	933 aged 32–33?	A Frankish count and the oldest known member of the family. His title of Marquis is usually given in retrospection: it's possible that he never used the title.
Aleramo	c.920? Son of Guglielmo I	933 – 991	Marquisate of Liguria	Adelaide three children Gerberga of Italy c.960 no children	991 aged 70–71?	Invested with fiefs in 938, when he is firstly documented.
Guglielmo II	c.940? First son of Aleramo and Adelaide	c.960 – 961	Marquisate of Liguria	Unmarried	961 aged 20–21?	Ruled alongside his father.
Anselmo I	c.940? Second son of Aleram and Adelaide	991 – 998	Marquisate of Western Liguria	Gisela of Milan four children	998 aged 57–58?	Younger children of Aleramo, ruled alongside his father at least since 983. After Aleramo's death the brothers made a division in their inheritance.
Oddone I	c.940? Third son of Aleramo and Adelaide	991	Marquisate of Eastern Liguria	? of Piacenza four children	991 aged 50–51?	Younger children of Aleramo, ruled alongside his father at least since 983. After Aleramo's death the brothers made a division in their inheritance.
Guglielmo III	c.970? First son of Oddone I	991 – c.1040	Marquisate of Eastern Liguria	Waza c.1030 four children	c.1040 aged 69–70?	Children of Oddone, divided their inheritance.
Riprando I	c.970? Second son of Oddone I	991 – c.1020	Marquisate of Occimiano	Unknown at least one child	c.1020 aged 49–50?	Children of Oddone, divided their inheritance.
Anselmo II	c.960? Second son of Anselmo I and Gisela of Milan	998 – c.1025	Marquisate of Western Liguria	Adela of Milan three children	c.1025 aged 64–65?	
Oddone	c.990 Son of Riprando I	c.1020 – 1050	Marquisate of Occimiano	Unknown three children	c.1050 aged 59–60?	
Oddone I	c.990? First son of Anselmo II and Adela of Milan	c.1025 – 1060	Marquisate of Western Liguria	Bertha of Turin; 1036 six children	c.1060 aged 69–70?	
Oddone II	1015; First son of Guglielmo III and Waza	c.1040 – 20 November 1084	Marquisate of Eastern Liguria	Constance of Savoy two children	20 November 1084 aged 50–51?	Children of Guglielmo III, ruled jointly.
Enrico	c.1015 Second son of Guglielmo III and Waza	c.1040 – 1045	Marquisate of Eastern Liguria	Unmarried	1045 aged 29–30	Children of Guglielmo III, ruled jointly.
Oberto I	c.1040? Son of Oddone	c.1050 – 1115	Marquisate of Occimiano	Unknown four children	c.1115 aged 74–75?	
Bonifazio I	1055; Savona; Third son of Oddone and Bertha of Turin	c.1060 – 1125	Marquisate of Western Liguria	? of Incisa (Note: Despite some sources referring a marriage to Alice of Savoy, a daughter of Peter II of Savoy, the marriage makes sense given the claimantship of the March of Turin (to which the Aleramics opposed the Savoyards). However, the degree of proximity between bride and groom was too close to be permitted.) seven children Agnes of Vermandois (1085-c.1130) six children	1125 aged 69–70?	After his death, his large inheritance was thoroughly divided between his sons.
Guglielmo IV	c.1030 First son of Oddone II and Constance of Savoy	20 November 1084 – 1100	Marquisate of Eastern Liguria	Emma of Apulia one child Otta di Agledo two children	1100 aged 69–70?	
Rainerio	1075; Second son of Guglielmo IV and Otta di Agledo	1100 – 1137	Marquisate of Montferrat	Gisela of Burgundy; 1105 five children	1137 aged 61–62	Children of Guglielmo IV, divided their inheritance. Rainerio was the first to be titled Marquis of Montferrat.
Enrico Balbo	c.1060 Second son of Guglielmo IV and Otta di Agledo	1100 – 1127	Marquisate of Rocchetta	Unknown one child	c.1127 aged 32–33?	Children of Guglielmo IV, divided their inheritance. Rainerio was the first to be titled Marquis of Montferrat.
Oberto II	c.1090? Son of Oberto I	c.1115 – 1145	Marquisate of Occimiano	Berta-Adelasia c.1125 five children	c.1145 aged 56–57?	
Manfredo I	c.1110? Savona; First son of Bonifacio and Agnes of Vermandois	1125 – 1175	Marquisate of Saluzzo	Eleonora of Arborea six children	1175; Saluzzo aged 64–65?	Children of Bonifazio, divided their inheritance. Ugo left no children and was succeeded by a nephew (son of Anselmo III).
Anselmo III	c.1110? Second son of Bonifazio and Agnes of Vermandois	1125 – 1178	Marquisate of Ceva (with Clavesana since 1170)	Unknown two children	c.1178 aged 67–68?	Children of Bonifazio, divided their inheritance. Ugo left no children and was succeeded by a nephew (son of Anselmo III).
Ugo	c.1110? Third son of Bonifazio I and Agnes of Vermandois	1125 – 1170	Marquisate of Clavesana	Unmarried	c.1170 aged 59–60?	Children of Bonifazio, divided their inheritance. Ugo left no children and was succeeded by a nephew (son of Anselmo III).
Bonifazio II	c.1120? Third son of Bonifazio I and Agnes of Vermandois	1125 – 1150	Marquisate of Incisa	Unknown at least one child	c.1150 aged 29-30?	Children of Bonifazio, divided their inheritance. Ugo left no children and was succeeded by a nephew (son of Anselmo III).
Guglielmo I	c.1120? Fifth son of Bonifazio I and Agnes of Vermandois	1125 – 1140	Marquisate of Busca	Unknown two children	c.1140 aged 19-20?	Children of Bonifazio, divided their inheritance. Ugo left no children and was succeeded by a nephew (son of Anselmo III).
Enrico I	c.1130? Sixth son of Bonifazio I and Agnes of Vermandois	1125 – 1185	Marquisate of Savona	Beatrice of Montferrat five children	c.1185 aged 54-55?	Children of Bonifazio, divided their inheritance. Ugo left no children and was succeeded by a nephew (son of Anselmo III).
Bernardo	c.1080? Son of Enrico	1127 – 1135	Marquisate of Rocchetta	Unknown one child	c.1135 (Note: He was alive in 1126, according to Monumenta Aquensia, Pars II, col. 320. It's possible that he lived at least until 1135) aged 54–55?	
Domicella	c.1120? Daughter of Bernardo	1135 – 1203	Marquisate of Rocchetta	Alberto I, Marquis of Incisa six children	1203 (Note: Despite being documented only until 1190, it's possible that she died in 1203, when her younger sons inherited her marquisate.); Incisa aged 82–83?	
Rocchetta annexed to Incisa
Guglielmo V the Elder	1110; First son of Rainerio and Gisela of Burgundy	1137 – 1191	Marquisate of Montferrat	Judith of Austria; 1133 nine children	1191; Tyre, Lebanonaged 50–51?	
Manfredo I	c.1130? First son of Guglielmo I	1140 – 1187	Marquisate of Busca	Unknown one child	1187 aged 56–57?	Siblings, possibly held the marquisate jointly, and founded two branches who apparently ruled concurrently, or jointly, the marquisate.
Berengario	c.1140? Second son of Guglielmo I	1140 – 1214	Marquisate of Busca	Emilia four children	1214 aged 73-74?	Siblings, possibly held the marquisate jointly, and founded two branches who apparently ruled concurrently, or jointly, the marquisate.
Guglielmo I	c.1110? First son of Oberto II and Berta-Adelasia	c.1145 – 1150	Marquisate of Occimiano	Galiana c.1145 no children	c.1150 aged 39–40?	Children of Oberto II, shared power, or at least shared, in documents, the title of marquis.
Oberto III	c.1110? Fifth son of Oberto I	c.1145 – 1150	Marquisate of Occimiano	Unmarried	c.1150 aged 39–40?	Children of Oberto II, shared power, or at least shared, in documents, the title of marquis.
Alberto I	c.1130? Son of Bonifazio II	1145 – 1188	Marquisate of Incisa	Domicella, Marchioness of Rocchetta six children	1188 aged 57-58	
Enrico	c.1130? First grandson of Oberto I	c.1150 – 1180	Marquisate of Occimiano	Unknown ? children (Note: Despite their names not being known, they were referenced as Enrico's children in 1203)	c.1180 aged 49–50?	Grandchildren of Oberto I (sons of a son or daughter of this marquis), and nephews of Oberto II. They shared power, or at least, in documents, the title of marquis.
Bernardo	c.1130? Second grandson of Oberto II and Berta-Adelasia	c.1150 – 1180	Marquisate of Occimiano	Unmarried	c.1180 aged 49–50?	Grandchildren of Oberto I (sons of a son or daughter of this marquis), and nephews of Oberto II. They shared power, or at least, in documents, the title of marquis.
Manfredo II	c.1140 Saluzzo; First son of Manfredo I and Eleonora of Arborea	1175 – February 1215	Marquisate of Saluzzo	Adelasia of Montferrat; 1182 four children	February 1215; Saluzzo aged 74–75?	
Guglielmo I	c.1140? First son of Anselmo III	1178 – 1205	Marquisate of Ceva	? of Vento five children	c.1205 aged 64–65?	Children of Anselmo III, divided their inheritance.
Bonifazio I	c.1140? Second son of Anselmo III	1178 – 1221	Marquisate of Clavesana	Unknown three children	1221 aged 80–81?	Children of Anselmo III, divided their inheritance.
Anselmo I	c.1170? First grandson of Enrico (?)	c.1180 – 1205	Marquisate of Occimiano	Unknown	c.1205 (Note: No references of his after 1202.) aged 34–35?	Possibly grandchildren of Enrico, ruled jointly.
Guglielmo II the Monk	c.1170? Second grandson of Enrico (?)	c.1180 – 1230	Marquisate of Occimiano	Unknown	c.1230 (Note: He was already dead in 1231) aged 59–60?	Possibly grandchildren of Enrico, ruled jointly.
Corrado	c.1170? Third grandson of Enrico (?)	c.1180 – 1200	Marquisate of Occimiano	Unknown	c.1205? aged 34–35?	Possibly grandchildren of Enrico, ruled jointly.
Anselmo II Camar	c.1170? Fourth grandson of Enrico (?)	c.1180 – 1205	Marquisate of Occimiano	Unknown one child?	c.1205? aged 34–35?	Possibly grandchildren of Enrico, ruled jointly.
Enrico II	c.1170 Savona; First son of Enrico I and Beatrice of Montferrat	1185 – 1231	Marquisate of Finale	Simona Guercio; 1181 no children Agata of Geneva three children	1231; Finale Ligure aged 60-61?	Children of Enrico I, divided their inheritance. Oddone, in 1191, abdicated from his marquisate, bequeathed it to the commune of Savona, and became its citizen.
Ottone	c.1170 Savona; Second son of Enrico I and Beatrice of Montferrat	1185 – 1191	Marquisate of Savona	Alda Embriaco three children	1240; Savona aged 69-70	Children of Enrico I, divided their inheritance. Oddone, in 1191, abdicated from his marquisate, bequeathed it to the commune of Savona, and became its citizen.
The marquisate of Savona was annexed to the namesake commune
Alberto II	c.1150? First son of Alberto I and Domicella	1188 – 1190	Marquisate of Incisa	Unmarried	1188 aged 57-58	Left no known descendants. The marquisate went to his brothers.
Guglielmo	c.1160? Second son of Alberto I and Domicella	1190 – 1215	Marquisate of Incisa	Alasia c.1190 no children	c.1215 aged 54-55?	Guglielmo was probably the sole ruler initially, but in 1203 had to divide the marquisate between his brothers: his mother's possessions were given to the younger brothers, but eventually reverted to Incisa.
Raimondo	c.1160? Third son of Alberto I and Domicella	1190 – 1215	Marquisate of Incisa	Unmarried	1215 aged 54-55?	Guglielmo was probably the sole ruler initially, but in 1203 had to divide the marquisate between his brothers: his mother's possessions were given to the younger brothers, but eventually reverted to Incisa.
Giacomo	c.1160? Fourth son of Alberto I and Domicella	1190 – 1215	Marquisate of Rocchetta (in Incisa until 1203)	Unmarried	c.1215 aged 54-55?	Guglielmo was probably the sole ruler initially, but in 1203 had to divide the marquisate between his brothers: his mother's possessions were given to the younger brothers, but eventually reverted to Incisa.
Pagano	c.1170? Fifth son of Alberto I and Domicella	1190 – 1215	Marquisate of Rocchetta (in Incisa until 1203)	Unmarried	c.1215 aged 44-45?	Guglielmo was probably the sole ruler initially, but in 1203 had to divide the marquisate between his brothers: his mother's possessions were given to the younger brothers, but eventually reverted to Incisa.
Rocchetta annexed again to Incisa
Corrado	1140; Montferrat; Second son of Guglielmo V and Judith of Austria	1191 – 28 April 1192	Marquisate of Montferrat	Unknown no children Theodora Angelina (d.c.1195) 1187 (separated May/June 1187)no children Isabella I, Queen of Jerusalem; 24 November 1190 one child	28 April 1192; Tyre, Lebanon aged 51–52	Also King of Jerusalem by right of his wife.
Bonifacio I	1140; Montferrat; Second son of Guglielmo V and Judith of Austria	28 April 1192 – 4 September 1207	Marquisate of Montferrat	Elena of Bosco (1145-1204) c.1170 three children Jeanne of Châtillon no children Margaret of Hungary; May 1204; Constantinople one child	4 September 1207; Tyre, Lebanon aged 50–51?	Laid also claim on the Kingdom of Thessalonica, ruling it effectively from 1205, after the Sack of Constantinople. During his reign in Montferrat, he encouraged the development of literature, inviting many troubadours to his court.
Guglielmo II	c.1160? First son of Guglielmo I	1205 – 1230	Marquisate of Ceva	Maria of Saluzzo one child	c.1230 aged 69–70?	Son-in-law of Manfredo II of Saluzzo, and father-in-law of Tommaso I of Saluzzo.
Guglielmo VI	1173; Montferrat; First son of Bonifacio I and Elena of Bosco	4 September 1207 – 17 September 1225	Marquisate of Montferrat	Sophia of Hohenstaufen (d.1187/88); 1187 no children Berta of Clavesana; 9 August 1202 three children	17 September 1225; Almyros aged 51–52	
Manfredo II	c.1150? First son of Manfredo I	1214 – 1215	Marquisate of Busca	Bianca Maletta eight children	1215 aged 64–65?	Cousins, possibly held the marquisate jointly. In spite of Manfred III having children, they stopped claiming co-rulership in the marquisate, which was then held exclusively by Berengar's line.
Guglielmo II	c.1160? First son of Berengario and Emilia	1214 – 5 April 1233	Marquisate of Busca	Audisia thee children	5 April 1233 aged 72–73?	Cousins, possibly held the marquisate jointly. In spite of Manfred III having children, they stopped claiming co-rulership in the marquisate, which was then held exclusively by Berengar's line.
Manfredo III	c.1180? First son of Manfredo II and Bianca Maletta	1215 – 1248	Marquisate of Busca	Unknown three children	1248; Asti aged 67–68?	Cousins, possibly held the marquisate jointly. In spite of Manfred III having children, they stopped claiming co-rulership in the marquisate, which was then held exclusively by Berengar's line.
Enrico	c.1200? Grandson of Alberto I and Domicella	1215 – 1273	Marquisate of Incisa	Unknown at least one child	c.1272 aged 72-73?	Son of an unknown son of Alberto I.
Regency of Adelasia of Montferrat (1215-1218)						Grandson of Manfredo II.
Manfredo III	1204; Saluzzo; Son of Bonifazio of Saluzzo and Maria of Torres	February 1215 – 29 October 1244	Marquisate of Saluzzo	Beatrice of Savoy; March 1233 four children	29 October 1244; Saluzzo aged 39–40	Grandson of Manfredo II.
Bonifazio II Tagliaferro	c.1180? First son of Bonifazio I	1221 – 1237	Marquisate of Clavesana	Unmarried	1237 aged 56–57?	Children of Bonifazio I, ruled jointly.
Oddone I	c.1180? Second son of Bonifazio I	1221 - 16 September 1233	Marquisate of Clavesana	Mabilia (d. 16 June 1248/14 March 1251) six children	1233 aged 52–53?	Children of Bonifazio I, ruled jointly.
Berta	1182; Daughter of Bonifazio I	1221 – 1224	Marquisate of Clavesana (at Mombarcaro and Cortemiglia)	Guglielmo VI, Marquis of Montferrat; 9 August 1202 three children	1224 aged 41–42	Children of Bonifazio I, ruled jointly.
Bonifazio II the Giant	July 1202; Montferrat; First son of Guglielmo VI and Berta of Clavesana	17 September 1225 – 12 May 1253	Marquisate of Montferrat	Margherita of Savoy I (d.1254) c.1235 three children	12 May 1253; Moncalvo aged 50	
Giorgio I	c.1190? Second son of Guglielmo I	1230 – 10 June 1268	Marquisate of Ceva	Unknown two children	10 June 1268 aged 77–78?	
Aleramo	c.1190? Son of Anselmo II (?)	c.1230 – 1265	Marquisate of Occimiano	Unknown two children	c.1265 (Note: He was already dead in 1269.) aged 74–75?	
Giacomo	1215; Alba; First son of Enrico II and Agata of Geneva	1231 – 21 October 1268	Marquisate of Finale	Caterina da Marano; May 1247 five children	21 October 1268; Finale Ligure aged 52-53	
Bonifazio III	c.1210? First son of Oddone I and Mabilia	1237 – 1268	Marquisate of Clavesana	Unmarried	1268 aged 57–58?	Children of Oddone I, ruled jointly.
Emmanuele I	c.1215? Second son of Oddone I and Mabilia	1237 – 1297	Marquisate of Clavesana	Unknown two children	1297 aged 80-81?	Children of Oddone I, ruled jointly.
Regencies of Beatrice of Savoy (1244) and Bonifazio II, Marquis of Montferrat (1244-1253)						
Tommaso I	1239; Saluzzo; First son of Manfredo III and Beatrice of Savoy	29 October 1244 – 3 December 1296	Marquisate of Saluzzo	Luisa of Ceva (d.22 August 1291) c.1260 fifteen children	3 December 1296; Saluzzo aged 64–65?	
Enrico	c.1190? First son of Guglielmo II and Audisia	1248 – 1281	Marquisate of Busca	Rufina three children	1281 aged 70–71?	Siblings and last known marquises. Ruled with Manfredo III since their father's death in 1233.
Oddone	c.1190? Second son of Guglielmo II and Audisia	1248 – c.1250?	Marquisate of Busca	Unmarried	c.1250? aged 39–40?	Siblings and last known marquises. Ruled with Manfredo III since their father's death in 1233.
Busca annexed to Saluzzo
Regency of Margherita of Savoy (I) (1253-1257)						
Guglielmo VII the Great	1240; Trino; Son of Bonifacio II and Margherita of Savoy (I)	12 May 1253 – 6 February 1292	Marquisate of Montferrat	Isabel de Clare (1240-1270); July 1258; Lyon two children Beatrice of Castile; August 1271; Murcia seven children	6 February 1292; Alessandria aged 51–52	
Oberto IV	c.1210? First son of Aleramo (?)	c.1265-1275	Marquisate of Occimiano	Unknown	c.1275 aged 74–75?	Children of Aleramo, ruled jointly.
Bonifazio	c.1210? Son of Aleramo (?)	c.1265-1275	Marquisate of Occimiano	Unknown	c.1275 aged 74–75?	Children of Aleramo, ruled jointly.
Occimiano merged again in Montferrat
Giorgio II	c.1250? First son of Giorgio I	10 June 1268 – 22 February 1313	Marquisate of Ceva	Unknown two children	1324 aged 73–74?	In 1313, Henry VII, Holy Roman Emperor, gave the marquisate to the duke of Savoy. This meant the loss of independence of the various branches that descended from Giorgio II. The marquisate itself met its end in 1427, when it was absorbed officially by Savoy.
Ceva annexed to Savoy
Antonio	c.1250 Alba; Son of Giacomo and Caterina da Marano	21 October 1268 – 1313	Marquisate of Finale	Eleonora Fieschi three children	1313; Finale Ligure aged 62-63	
Alberto III	c.1240? Son of Enrico	1273 – 1323	Marquisate of Incisa	Unknown at least one child	c.1323 aged 82-83?	
Giovanni I the Just	1277; Milan; Third son of Guglielmo VII and Beatrice of Castile	6 February 1292 – 9 January 1305	Marquisate of Montferrat	Margaret of Savoy II; 23 March 1296 no children	9 January 1305; Montferrat aged 27–28	Left no descendants.
Manfredo IV	1262; Saluzzo; First son of Tommaso I and Luisa of Ceva	3 December 1296 – 29 July 1332	Marquisate of Saluzzo	Beatrice of Sicily; 1287 two children Isabella Doria; 1308 five children	16 September 1340; Cortemilia aged 77–78	In 1332, after a war between his children over the succession, Manfredo signed a treaty with Amadeus VI, Count of Savoy, in which he abdicated to his eldest son, Federico.
Oddone II	c.1250? First son of Emmanuele I	1297 – 1308	Marquisate of Clavesana	? Spinola one child	1308 aged 57–58?	Children of Emmanuele I, ruled jointly.
Francesco	c.1250? Second son of Emmanuele I	1297 – 1310	Marquisate of Clavesana	Giacomina two children	1310 aged 59–60?	Children of Emmanuele I, ruled jointly.
Violante-Irene	1274; Casale Monferrato; First daughter of Guglielmo VII and Beatrice of Castile	9 January 1305 – 1306	Marquisate of Montferrat	Andronikos II Palaiologos; 1284 (separated 1303) seven children	1317; Constantinople aged 42–43	Inherited the marquisate from her brother in 1305, and tried to propose her eldest son to succeed her brother, but got rejected by Patriarch Athanasius I of Constantinople. Given that she inherited the marquisate, it's probable that she ruled in Montferrat between the death of her brother and the arrival of the chosen successor of John, her son Theodore. Yolande was also Eastern Roman Empress consort at Constantinople.
Montferrat inherited by the Palaiologos dynasty
Regency of Oberto Spinola (1310-1314?)						The marquisate was probably ruled by Federico (Oddone's son) and Argentina and Caterina, Francesco's daughters. As Argentina and Caterina's children were also known as Marquis of Clavesana, it's possible that, at this point, the three ruled jointly, or they divided the marquisate between them.
Federico	c.1300? Only son of Oddone II and ? Spinola	1310 – 1363	Marquisate of Clavesana (1/3 each)	Unknown two children	1363 aged 62–63?	The marquisate was probably ruled by Federico (Oddone's son) and Argentina and Caterina, Francesco's daughters. As Argentina and Caterina's children were also known as Marquis of Clavesana, it's possible that, at this point, the three ruled jointly, or they divided the marquisate between them.
Argentina	c.1300? First daughter of Francesco and Giacomina	1310 – 1355	Marquisate of Clavesana (1/3 each)	Rafaele Doria no children ? of Saluzzo one child	c.1355 aged 54–55?	The marquisate was probably ruled by Federico (Oddone's son) and Argentina and Caterina, Francesco's daughters. As Argentina and Caterina's children were also known as Marquis of Clavesana, it's possible that, at this point, the three ruled jointly, or they divided the marquisate between them.
Caterina	c.1300? Second daughter of Francesco and Giacomina	1310-1350	Marquisate of Clavesana (1/3 each)	Enrico del Carretto (d.22 April 1328/8 May 1340) two children	c.1350? aged 49–50?	The marquisate was probably ruled by Federico (Oddone's son) and Argentina and Caterina, Francesco's daughters. As Argentina and Caterina's children were also known as Marquis of Clavesana, it's possible that, at this point, the three ruled jointly, or they divided the marquisate between them.
Giorgio	c.1290 Finale Ligure; Son of Antonio and Eleonora Fieschi	1313 – 1367	Marquisate of Finale	Unknown five children	1367; Genoa aged 76-77	
Guglielmo II	c.1290? Son of Alberto III	1323 – 1365	Marquisate of Incisa	Unknown at least one child	c.1365? aged 74-75	
Federico I	1287; Savona; Son of Manfredo IV and Beatrice of Sicily	29 July 1332 – 29 June 1336	Marquisate of Saluzzo	Margaret of Viennois; 1303 two children Giacomina di Biandrate; 21 June 1333 no children	29 June 1336; Saluzzo aged 64–65?	From 1330, fought with his younger half-brother Manfredo, who their father had favoured and designated successor with the influence of Federico's stepmother Isabella Doria. The treaty with the count of Savoy (1332) made his father abdicate and give the land to him.
Tommaso II	1304; Saluzzo; Son of Federico I and Margaret of Viennois	29 June 1336 – 1341 1342 – 18 August 1357	Marquisate of Saluzzo	Ricciarda of Milan; 1329 eleven children	18 August 1357; Saluzzo aged 52–53	Became involved in his father's previous war of succession, as his uncle Manfredo came back to reclaim power once more. However, his uncle's victory was short-lived, and he recovered the throne not long after.
Manfredo V	c.1310? Saluzzo; Second son of Manfredo IV and Isabella Doria	1341 – 1342	Marquisate of Saluzzo	Eleonora of Savoy; 1333 eight children	1392; Pavia aged 81–82?	After the war with his brother and subsequent exile, he managed to take power from his nephew. However, he was eventually persuaded by the House of Visconti to abandon his claim on Saluzzo.
Federico II	1332; Saluzzo; First son of Tommaso II and Ricciarda of Milan	18 August 1357 – 1396	Marquisate of Saluzzo	Beatrice of Geneva; 1360 nine children	1396; Saluzzo aged 63–64	
Emmanuele II	c.1320? Only son of Federico	1363 – 1385	Marquisate of Clavesana (1/3)	Andriola three children	1385 aged 64–65?	After his death, what was left on the marquisate on the male line was divided between Savoy, the Republic of Genoa, and the Marquisate of Finale.
Clavesana divided between Savoy, Finale and the Republic of Genoa
Corrado	c.1330? Son of Guglielmo II	1365 – 1390	Marquisate of Incisa	Unknown at least one child	c.1390 aged 59-60	
Lazzarino I	c.1330 Finale Ligure; First son of Giorgio	1367 – 1393	Marquisate of Finale	Marietta del Carretto two children	1393; Finale Ligure aged 62-63	Children of Giorgio, divided their inheritance.
Carlo I Diego	c.1340 Finale Ligure; Second son of Giorgio	1367 – 1421	Marquisate of Zuccarello	Pomellina Adorno (1355-1410/11); 1375 four children	1421; Finale Ligure aged 80-81?	Children of Giorgio, divided their inheritance.
Pietro	c.1370? Son of Corrado	1390 – 1430	Marquisate of Incisa	Unknown at least one child	c.1430 aged 59-60?	
Lazzarino II	c.1370 Finale Ligure; Son of Lazzarino I and Marietta del Carretto	1393 – August 1412	Marquisate of Finale	Caterina del Carretto two children	August 1412; Lucca aged 41-42	
Tommaso III	1356; Saluzzo; First son of Federico II and Beatrice of Geneva	1396 – 1416	Marquisate of Saluzzo	Margaret of Roucy; 1403 five children	1416; Saluzzo aged 59–60	
Galeotto I	c.1390 Finale Ligure; First son of Lazzarino II and Caterina del Carretto	August 1412 – 5 February 1449	Marquisate of Finale	Vannina Adorno nine children	June 1450; Quimper aged 59-60	Involved in Genoese politics, he was exiled in 1449. The marquisate was ruled by his brother as regent until his death in the following year.
Regency of Giovanni I del Carretto, Marquis of Finale (1449-1450)						Involved in Genoese politics, he was exiled in 1449. The marquisate was ruled by his brother as regent until his death in the following year.
Regency of Margaret of Roucy and Valerano of Saluzzo (1416-1424)						
Ludovico I	1405; Saluzzo; First son of Tommaso III and Margaret of Roucy	1416 – 15 April 1475	Marquisate of Saluzzo	Isabella Palaiologina of Montferrat; 7 August 1435 nine children	15 April 1475; Saluzzo aged 69–70	
Enrico	c.1370 Zuccarello; Son of Carlo I Diego and Pomellina Adorno	1421 – 1431	Marquisate of Zuccarello	Paganina Guarco (1400-1450/51); 1422/23 three children	1431; Zuccarello aged 60-61	
Enrico II	c.1390? Son of Pietro	1430 – 1471	Marquisate of Incisa	Unknown at least one child	1471 aged 82-83?	
Carlo II	1425; Zuccarello; First son of Enrico and Paganina Guarco	1431 – 6 January 1488	Marquisate of Zuccarello	Maria del Carretto (d.1487) four children	6 January 1488; Zuccarello aged 62-63	Children of Enrico, ruled jointly.
Giorgio	1427; Zuccarello; Second son of Enrico and Paganina Guarco	1431 – 1452	Marquisate of Zuccarello	Maria Giustiniani one child Clemenza Fregoso (1429-1507); 1468; Genoa one child	1452; Zuccarello aged 24-25	Children of Enrico, ruled jointly.
Giovanni I	c.1400 Finale Ligure; Second son of Lazzarino II and Caterina del Carretto	20 December 1450 – April 1468	Marquisate of Finale	Viscontina Adorno; 1451; Genoa three children	April 1468; Finale Ligure aged 67-68	Previously regent, took power after his brother's death.
Galeotto II	1452; Finale Ligure; First son of Giovanni and Viscontina Adorno	1468 – 9 February 1482	Marquisate of Finale	Elisabetta dal Verme no children	9 February 1482; Finale Ligure aged 29-30	
Ottone	c.1450? Son of Enrico II	1471 – July 1514	Marquisate of Incisa	Franchetta Asinari; 1503 at least one child	July 1514; Nizza Monferrato aged 63-64	
Incisa briefly annexed to Montferrat (1514-1517)
Ludovico II	23 March 1438; Saluzzo; Second son of Ludovico I and Isabella Palaiologina of Montferrat	15 April 1475 – 27 January 1504	Marquisate of Saluzzo	Giovanna Palaiologina of Montferrat; August 1481 one child Margaret of Foix-Candale; 1492 five children	27 January 1504; Genoa aged 65	
Alfonso I	1457; Finale Ligure; Third son of Giovanni and Viscontina Adorno	9 February 1482 – 1499 15 August 1514 – 1516	Marquisate of Finale	Bianca Simonetta (d.1487) no children Peretta Usodimare; 16 November 1488; Rome five children	1516; Finale Ligure aged 58-59	Brothers, fought for succession with his brother, Archbishop Carlo Domenico.
Carlo Domenico	1454; Finale Ligure; Second son of Giovanni and Viscontina Adorno	1499 – 15 August 1514	Marquisate of Finale	Unmarried	15 August 1514; Rome aged 59-60	Brothers, fought for succession with his brother, Archbishop Carlo Domenico.
Antonio	c.1450 Zuccarello; Son of Carlo II and Maria del Carretto	6 January 1488 – 1519	Marquisate of Zuccarello	Anne de Seyssel four children	1519; Zuccarello aged 68-69	Cousins, ruled jointly.
Gian Giacomo	c.1450 Zuccarello; Son of Giorgio and Clemenza Fregoso	6 January 1488 – 6 October 1518	Marquisate of Zuccarello	Anna de Bolliers three children	6 October 1518; Zuccarello aged 67-68	Cousins, ruled jointly.
Regency of Margaret of Foix-Candale (1504-1522)						Left no descendants. The marquisate passed to his brothers.
Michele Antonio	26 March 1495; Saluzzo; First son of Ludovico II and Margaret of Foix-Candale	27 January 1504 – 18 October 1528	Marquisate of Saluzzo	Unmarried	18 October 1528; Aversa aged 33	Left no descendants. The marquisate passed to his brothers.
Giovanni II	1502; Finale Ligure; Son of Alfonso I and Peretta Usodimare	1516 – 30 June 1535	Marquisate of Finale	Ginevra Bentivoglio (1503-1534); 1524; Milan five children	30 June 1535; Tunis aged 32-33	
Gian Giacomo	c.1490? Son of Ottone and Franchetta Asinari	22 April 1517 – 1546	Marquisate of Incisa	Francesca Lacerda at least one child	1546 aged 82-83?	Franchetta Asinari managed to re-establish the marquisate for her sons after its annexation to Montferrat on her husband's demise.
Gian Bartolomeo	1475; Zuccarello; First son of Antonio and Anne de Seyssel	1519 – 21 July 1554	Marquisate of Zuccarello	Caterina del Carretto of Castelvecchio three children	21 July 1554; Albenga aged 78-79	Children of Antonio, ruled jointly. Pirro's descendants became Marquesses of Balestrino, not listed here.
Pirro	1476; Zuccarello; Second son of Antonio and Anne de Seyssel	1519 – 16 March 1553	Marquisate of Zuccarello	Caterina del Carretto of Prunetto (d.1542); 1494; Balestrino three children Caterina Barla (1525-1553); 1544; Pieve di Teco no children	16 March 1553; Balestrino aged 76-77	Children of Antonio, ruled jointly. Pirro's descendants became Marquesses of Balestrino, not listed here.
Giovanni Ludovico	21 October 1496; Saluzzo; Second son of Ludovico II and Margaret of Foix-Candale	18 October 1528 – 2 June 1529	Marquisate of Saluzzo	Unmarried	1563; Beaufort-en-Vallée aged 66–67	In 1529, he was forced to abdicate to his younger brother by Francis I of France.
Francesco Ludovico	25 February 1498; Saluzzo; Third son of Ludovico II and Margaret of Foix-Candale	2 June 1529 – 28 March 1537	Marquisate of Saluzzo	Unmarried	28 March 1537; Carmagnola aged 39	Left no descendants. He was succeeded by his younger brother.
Alfonso II	1525; Finale Ligure; First son of Giovanni II and Ginevra Bentivoglio	30 June 1535 – 9 November 1583	Marquisate of Finale	Unmarried	9 November 1583; Vienna aged 57-58	
Gabriele	26 September 1501; Saluzzo; Fifth son of Ludovico II and Margaret of Foix-Candale	28 March 1537 – 29 July 1548	Marquisate of Saluzzo	Madeleine d'Annebault no children	29 July 1548; Pinerolo aged 46	Last marquis of the family in Saluzzo. After his death the marquisate was annexed to France.
Saluzzo annexed by France
Boarello	c.1520? Son of Gian Giacomo and Francesca Lacerda	1546 – 1548	Marquisate of Incisa	Unknown	c.1550 aged 82-83?	Abdicated; the marquisate was annexed to the Duchy of Mantua.
Incisa annexed to Mantua
Filiberto	1523; Zuccarello; Son of Gian Bartolomeo and Caterina del Carretto of Castelvecchio	16 March 1553 – 7 April 1574	Marquisate of Zuccarello	Peretta Doria (1532-1590); 1548; Oneglia six children	7 April 1574; Zuccarello aged 50-51	
Scipione	1550; Zuccarello; Son of Filiberto and Peretta Doria	7 April 1574 – 1588	Marquisate of Zuccarello	Girolama Lomellini (d.1610); 1572; Genoa four children	1605; Mondovi aged 54-55	In 1588 abdicated of his feuds to the Duchy of Savoy; the Holy Roman Empire didn't recognise this cession, and appointed a council of regency. In 1598 the marquisate was enfeoffed to Scipione's brother Prospero.
Council of Regency (1588-1598)						In 1588 abdicated of his feuds to the Duchy of Savoy; the Holy Roman Empire didn't recognise this cession, and appointed a council of regency. In 1598 the marquisate was enfeoffed to Scipione's brother Prospero.
Alessandro	30 August 1528; Finale Ligure; Second son of Giovanni II and Ginevra Bentivoglio	9 November 1583 – 1596	Marquisate of Finale	Unmarried	1596; Finale Ligure aged 67-68	
Sforza Andrea	1534; Finale Ligure; Third son of Giovanni II and Ginevra Bentivoglio	1596 – 1602	Marquisate of Finale	Faustina Sforza (1576-1628); 1595; Milan no children	1602; Carcare aged 67-68	After his death with no descendants, Finale was absorbed by Spain.
Finale annexed to Spain
Prospero	1554; Zuccarello; Second son of Filiberto and Peretta Doria	1598 – 1607	Marquisate of Zuccarello	Lavinia Ortiz (1575-1610); 1594; Prague four children	1607; Zuccarello aged 52-53	
Ottavio	1557; Zuccarello; Third son of Filiberto and Peretta Doria	1607 – 1631	Marquisate of Zuccarello	Lelia Morone (d. 16 May 1643); 1609; Genoa two children	13 February 1632; Genoa aged 81-82	Alienated the marquisate to the Genoese Republic, in 1631, and died the next year.
Zuccarello annexed to the Genoese Republic

== Gallery ==
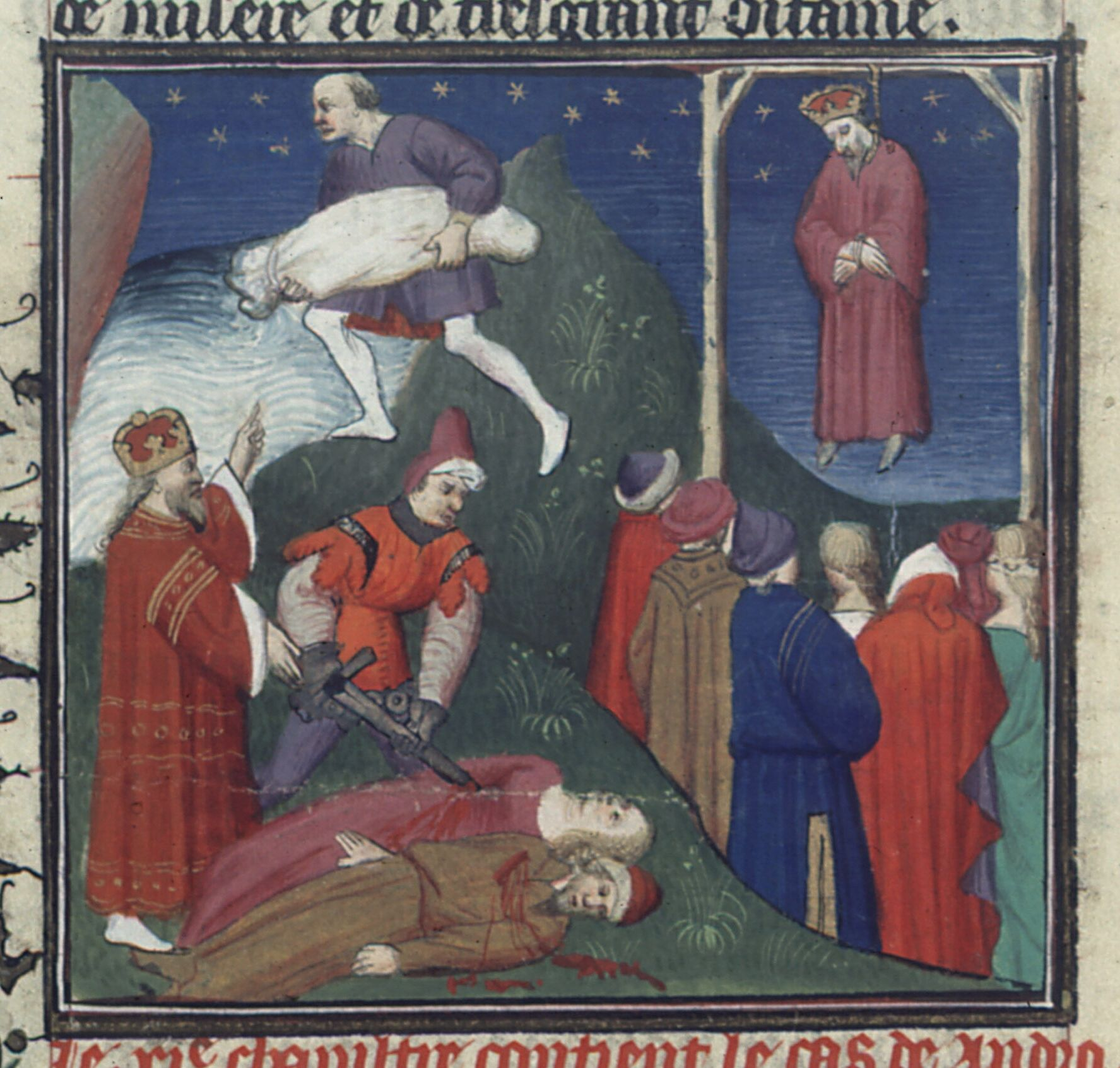
The death of Caesar Renier of Monferrat and his wife Maria Komnene

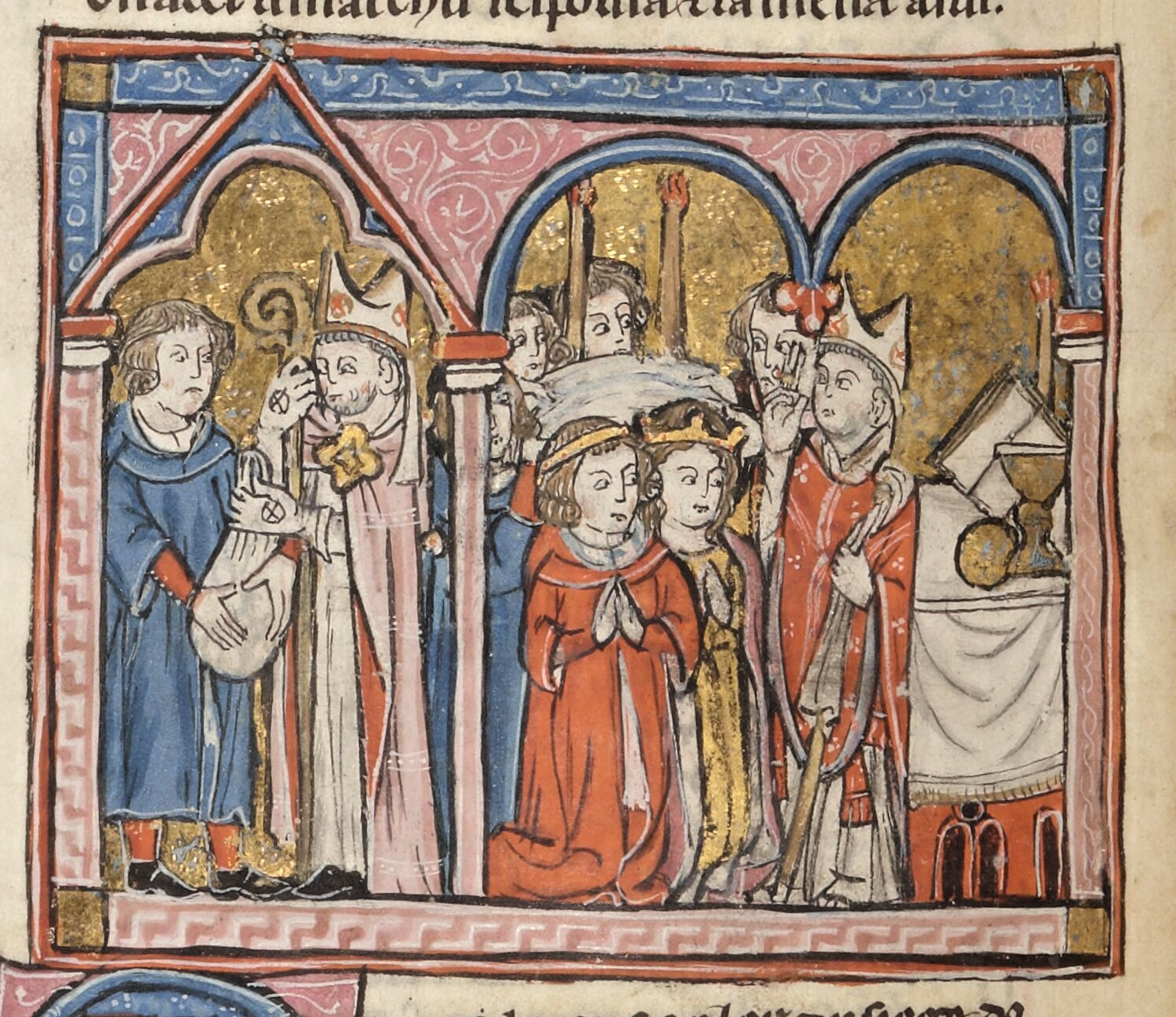
Marriage of Conrad of Montferrat and Isabella I of Jerusalem

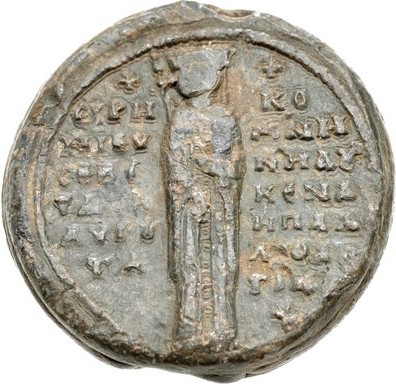
Coin depicting Irene of Montferrat as Eastern Roman Empress

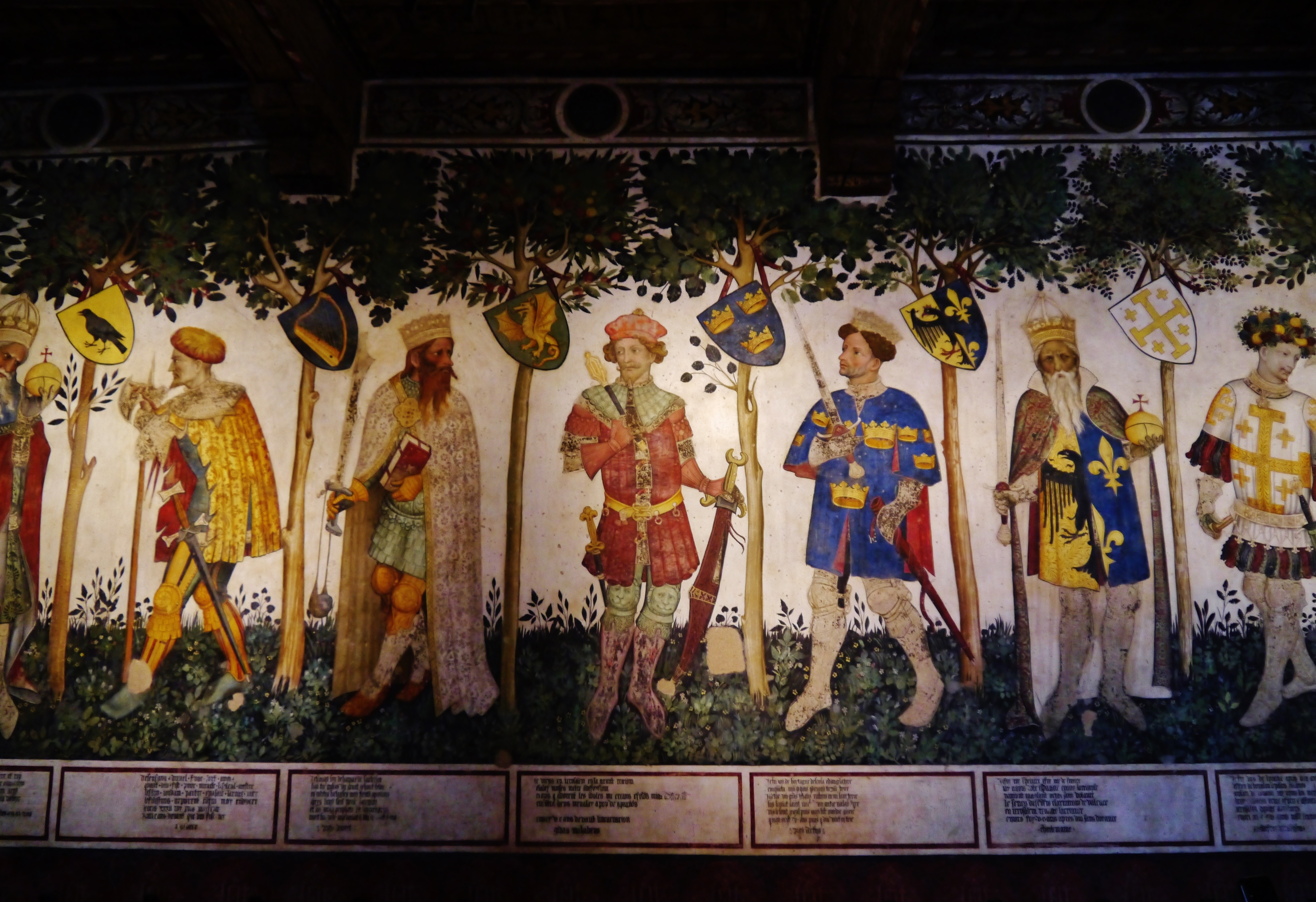
Several Aleramici del Vasto at Castello della Manta

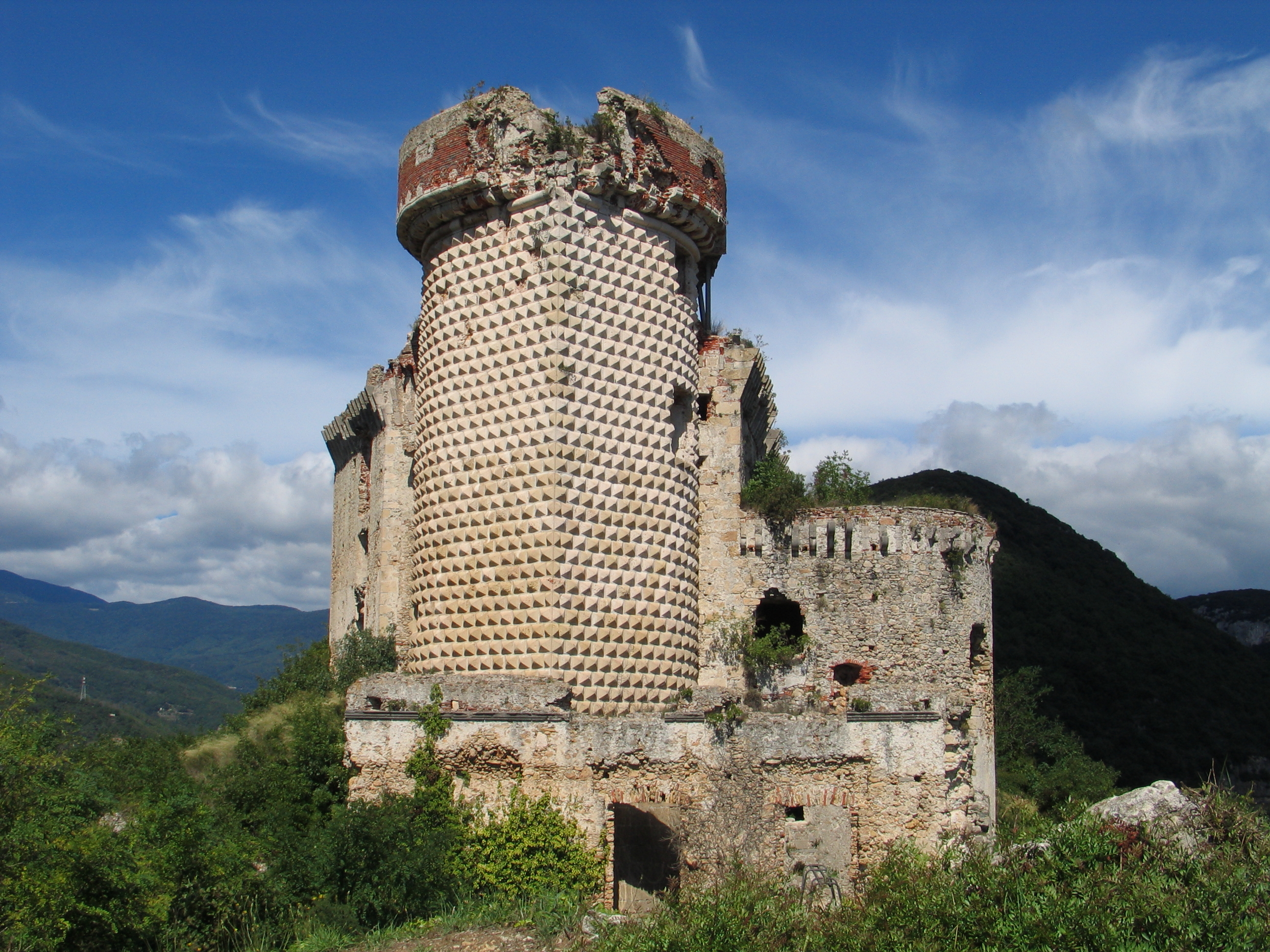
Castel Gavone of the Marquises of Finale

== Family tree ==
Aleramici

Aleramo (958–991) I Marquis of Central Liguria
married 1. Adelaide 2. Gerberga of Ivrea (daughter of Berengar II, king of Lombardy)

- William II, Marquess of Montferrat co-ruler with his father (no offspring)
- Anselmo I founder of the main branch Aleramici de Savona or del Vasto
  - Anselmo II
    - Otto marquess of Western Liguria
      - Boniface del Vasto marquess of Western Liguria
        - Manfred I, Marquess of Saluzzo (1125–1175)
          married Eleanor
          - Manfred II, Marquess of Saluzzo (1175–1215)
            married Azalaïs of Montferrat (daughter of William V, Marquess of Montferrat)
            - Boniface
              married Maria Torres (daughter of Comita III, guidice in Sardinia)
              - Manfred III, Marquess of Saluzzo (1215–1244)
                married Beatrice of Savoy (daughter of Amadeus IV, Count of Savoy)
                - Thomas I, Marquess of Saluzzo (1244–1296)
                  married Luigia/Aloisia di Ceva
                  - Manfred IV, Marquess of Saluzzo (1296–1330)
                    married 1.Beatrice of Hohenstaufen (daughter of Manfred, King of Sicily) 2.Isabella Doria (daughter of Bernabo Doria)
                    - Manfred V, Marquess of Saluzzo (1330–1332)
                    - Frederick I, Marquess of Saluzzo (1330–1336)
                      married Margarete de La Tour-du-Pin (daughter of Humbert I of Viennois)
                      - Thomas II, Marquess of Saluzzo (1336–57)
                        married Richarda Visconti (daughter of Galeazzo I, lord of Milan)
                        - Frederick II, Marquess of Saluzzo (1357–1396)
                          married Beatrice (daughter of Hugh of Geneve)
                          - Thomas III, Marquess of Saluzzo (1396–1416)
                            - Ricciarda
                              married Niccolò III d'Este, Marquis of Ferrara
                            - Ludovico I, Marquess of Saluzzo (1416–1475)
                              married 1.Isabella Palaiologo (daughter of John Jacob, Marquess of Montferrat)
                              - Ludovico II, Marquess of Saluzzo (1475–1504)
                                married 1.Giovanna Palaiologo (daughter of William VIII, Marquess of Montferrat) 2.Margaret de Foix (daughter of Jean, count of Candale)
                                - Michele Antonio, Marquess of Saluzzo (1504–1528)
                                - Giovanni Ludovico, Marquess of Saluzzo (1528–1529)
                                - Francesco of Saluzzo (1529–1537)
                                - Gian Gabriele I of Saluzzo (1537–1548)
                                  king Henry II annexed Saluzzo to France
- Otto I, Marquess of Montferrat (d. 991), founder of the cadet branch of Montferrat
  - William III, Marquess of Montferrat (991–1042)
    married Wasa
    - Otto II, Marquess of Montferrat (1042–1084)
      married Constance of Savoy (daughter of Amadeus II, Count of Savoy)
      - William IV, Marquess of Montferrat (1084–1100)
        married Otta di Aglie
        - Rainier, Marquess of Montferrat (1100–1136)
          married Gisela of Ivrea (daughter of William I, Count of Burgundy)
          - Giovanne
            married William Clito of Normandy, count of Flanders
          - William V, Marquess of Montferrat the old (1136–1191)
            married Judith of Babenberg (daughter of Leopold III, Margrave of Austria)
            - William of Montferrat, Count of Jaffa and Ascalon the longsword
              married Sibylla d'Anjou, queen of Jerusalem (daughter of Amalric I, king of Jerusalem)
              - Baldwin V king of Jerusalem (1185–1186)
            - Conrad of Montferrat marquess (1191–1192)
              married 2.Theodora Angelina (sister of Isaac II, Roman Emperor) 3.Isabella d'Anjou, queen of Jerusalem (daughter of Amalric I, king of Jerusalem)
            - Renier of Montferrat
              married Maria Komnene (daughter of Manuel I, Roman emperor)
            - Azalais/Adelasia
              married Manfred II, Marquess of Saluzzo
            - Boniface I, Marquess of Montferrat marquis of Montferrat (1192–1207), king of Thessalonica (1205–1207)
              married 1.Helena del Bosco 2.Jeanne de Chatillon 3.Margaret of Hungary (daughter of king Bela III of Hungary)
              - Agnes
                married Henry of Flanders, Latin emperor of Constantinople
              - Demetrius, king of Thessalonica (1207–1224)
              - William VI, Marquess of Montferrat (1207–1225)
                married Berta di Clavesna (daughter of Bonifacio, marquess of Cortemiglia)
                - Beatrice
                  married 1.Guigues VI of Viennois 2.Guy II lord of Bauge 3.Pierre de La Roue
                - Alix/Alasia
                  married Henry I de Lusignan, king of Cyprus
                - Boniface II, Marquess of Montferrat, the giant (1225–53)
                  married Margaret of Savoy (daughter of Amadeus IV, Count of Savoy)
                  - Adelaide
                    married Albert I of Welf, duke of Brunswick-Lüneburg
                  - William VII, Marquess of Montferrat, the great (1253–1292)
                    married 1.Isabella de Clare (daughter of Richard, earl of Gloucester) 2.Beatrice of Ivrea (daughter of Alfonso X, king of Castile)
                    - Margherita
                      married 1.Pallavicini 2.Juan of Castile
                    - John I, Marquess of Montferrat (1292–1305)
                      married Marguerite of Savoy (daughter of Amadeus V, Count of Savoy)
                    - Yolanda/Violante (renamed Irene) marchioness of Montferrat
                      married Andronikos II Palaiologos, Roman Emperor
                      - Theodore I Palaiologos marquess of Montferrat (1338–1372)
                        Montferrat ruled by the Palaiologos family and later by the Gonzaga family

== See also ==
- March of Montferrat
- Marquisate of Saluzzo
- Marquisate of Finale
- Marquisate of Ceva
