= Bertha of Turin =

11th-century Italian noblewoman

Bertha (c.1020/4 – after 1064/5) was a member of the Arduinici dynasty.

Bertha was the daughter of Ulric Manfred II of Turin and Bertha of Milan. Her older sister was Adelaide of Susa. Bertha possessed property in the southern part of the county of Asti, between the lower Belbo and Tanaro rivers.

She married Otto (or Teto) of Savona, margrave of western Liguria, c.1036. Otto was a member of the Aleramici dynasty, and was the son of Anselm II of Savona and Adela of Saluzzo. With Otto she had at least six children:

- Boniface del Vasto, margrave of Savona and Western Liguria
- Manfred, father of Henry del Vasto and Adelaide del Vasto
- Anselm
- Henry
- Otto
- Gerberga
