= Incisa =

Incisa may refer to:

== Places of Italy ==
- Incisa Scapaccino (originally Incisa Belbo), a municipality in the province of Asti.
- Incisa in Val d'Arno, a municipality in the province of Florence.
- Marquisate of Incisa (1161-1548), a lordship aleramica of Piedmont

== People ==
- Oddone d'Incisa (1450/60-1514), Italian aleramic marquess
- Stefano Giuseppe Incisa (1742-1819), Italian canon and historian
