= Marquisate of Ceva =

Italian state (1125–1427)

Coordinates: 44°39′N 07°29′E

Marquisate of Ceva Marchesato di Ceva (Italian)
- 1125–1427
- Coat of arms

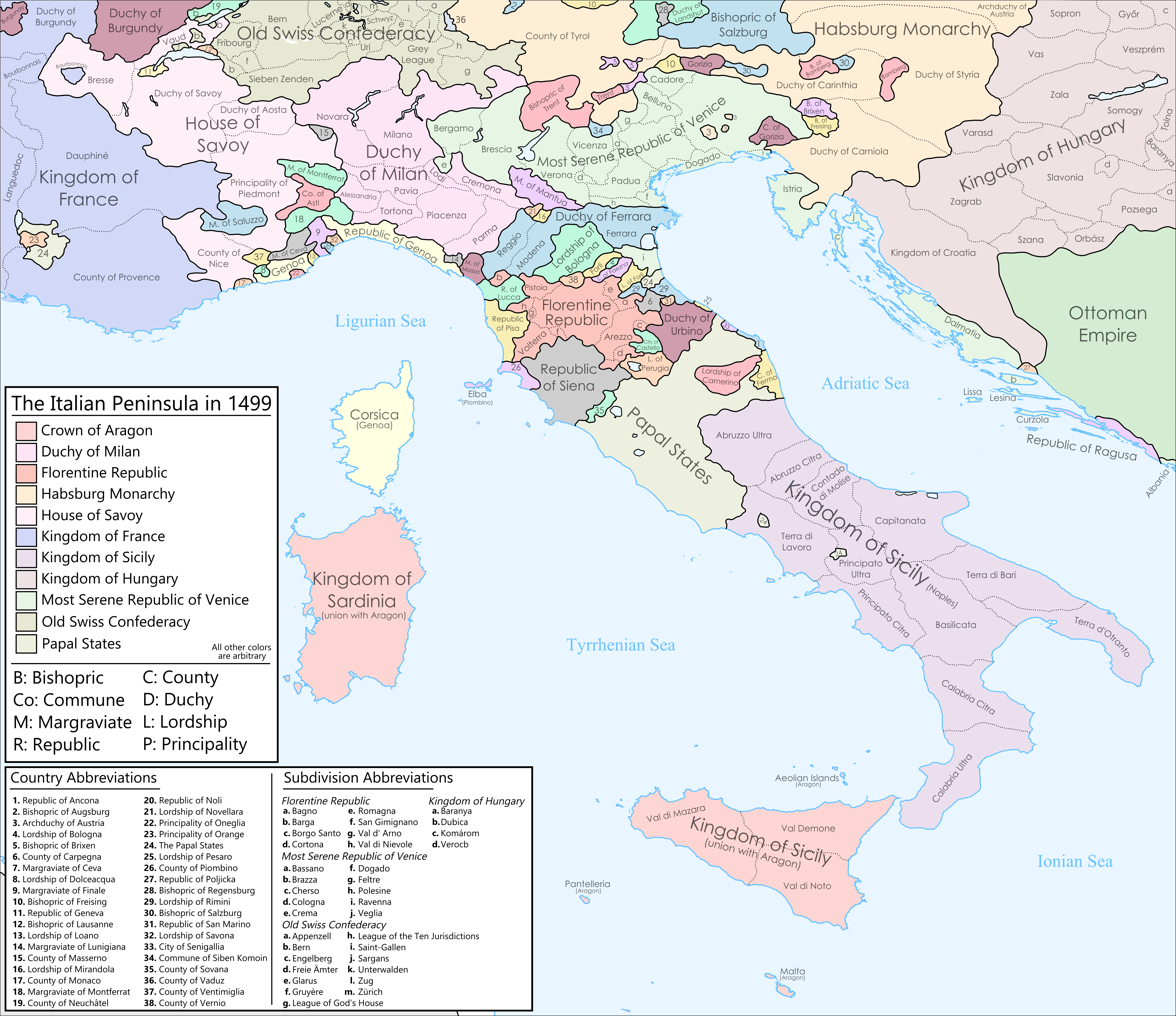
- Capital: Ceva
- Religion: Roman Catholicism
- Government: Marquisate
- Marquis
  - 1125: Anselmo
- History
  - Death of Boniface del Vasto, establishment of the Marquisate: 1125
  - Annexion to Savoy: 1427
Succeeded by
Duchy of Savoy

The Marquisate of Ceva was a small independent state in north-western Italy, situated at the foot of the Apennines, with its seat at Ceva, in what is now a part of Piedmont.

== Establishment ==
The marquisate was created in 1125 at the death of Boniface del Vasto, of the Aleramici family, his son Anselmo becoming the first marquis of the newly formed state. He subsequently acquired a part of the province Clavesana from his brother Ugo, but at Anselmo's death Ceva (assigned to his son Guglielmo) was again divided from Clavesana, which went to the other son Bonifacio.

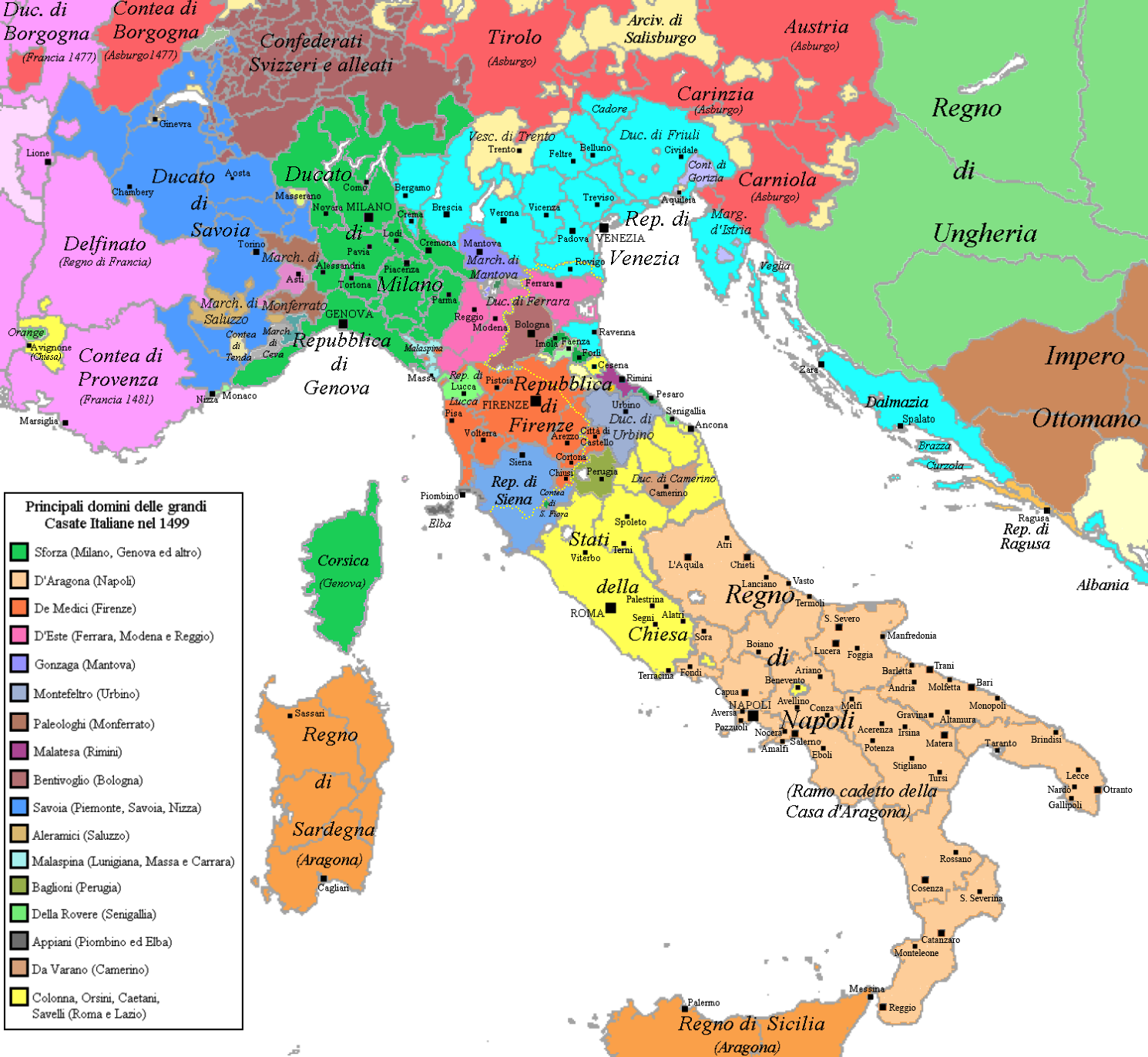
Borders of the Marquisate of Ceva in 1499

The marquisate was partitioned in several petty states between Guglielmos, and its fortunes began to decline. Marquis Giorgio Nano had thus to submit to the increasingly powerful commune of Asti, which had previously helped marquis Guglielmo II in extending his territories during the 12th century. Further weakened by internal strife, the marquisate submitted to Amadeus V of Savoy on 22 February 1313. During the wars between the marquisates of Saluzzo, Monferrato and the Angevins, Ceva swore loyalty to John II of Montferrat. In 1352 it was conquered by the Visconti of Milan, who were pushed back by the marquis in 1356.

The fragmented marquisate was eventually acquired by the French Duke of Orleans, and ultimately Savoy in 1531.

== See also ==
- Ceva Grimaldi family
