= Henry del Vasto =

Henry del Vasto (Italia: Enrico del Vasto), died before 1141 was a son of Manfred del Vasto, margrave of Western Liguria, and brother of Adelaide, countess of Sicily (1089–1117) and Jerusalem (1112–1117) and of Boniface, margrave of Savona and Western Liguria.

== Early life ==
His father's family was a branch of the Aleramici, sharing a common descent from Aleramo of Montferrat with the Marquesses of Montferrat. His brothers founded the lines of the Marquesses of Saluzzo, of Busca, of Lancia, of Ceva, and of Savona.

== Biography ==
He received Paternò and Butera in Sicily from either Roger I of Sicily or Adelaide during her regency after 1101. He also married Flandina, a daughter of Roger and his second wife, Eremburga of Mortain. He was considered the count of Lombards of Sicily and Aleramici branch of Sicily. His nephew, Roger II, named one of his sons Henry after the child's great uncle. He was the founder of the Mazzarino family.

According to Alexander of Telese, it was Henry's idea that Roger, who then ruled all of Southern Italy and Sicily, should have the title of king and rule in Palermo, where, he alleged, kings had ruled in the past. Roger was duly crowned in 1130.

== Family ==
Henry had five sons from his wife Fland(r)ina:

- Roger
- Simone (died c. 1156), Count of Policastro
- Manfred
- Jordan
- Girard

== Sources ==
- Carlo Alberto Garufi, Gli Aleramici e i Normanni in Sicilia e nelle Puglie, in Centenario della nascita di Michele Amari, I, Palermo 1910
- Pasquale Hamel, Adelaide del Vasto, Regina di Gerusalemme. Palermo: Sellerio Editore, 1997.
