= Boniface del Vasto =

Italian noble (c. 1055 – c. 1125)

- Margrave of Savona & Western Liguria
- Coat of arms of Del Vasto.
- Tenure: 1084 – 1125
- Known for: Member of the Aleramici dynasty and maternal grand uncle of Roger II
- Born: c.1055
- Died: c.1125 (aged around 70); Loreto Castle, Italy
- Locality: Liguria
- Parents: Otto del Vasto (son of Anselm II); Bertha of Turin

Boniface del Vasto (c. 1055 – c. 1125) was the margrave of Savona and Western Liguria from 1084 to c. 1125. He was the son and successor of Otto and of Bertha, daughter of Ulric Manfred II of Turin. Boniface was a member of the Aleramici dynasty.

== Marriages ==
As his first wife, Boniface intended to marry an unnamed woman who had been betrothed to his brother, Anselm, before his death. In 1079 Pope Gregory VII commissioned the bishops of Turin, Asti and Alba to convince Boniface del Vasto not to marry the woman, because her betrothal to his brother created a relationship of affinity between them.

Boniface is sometimes said to have married Alice of Savoy, the daughter of Peter of Savoy. This is unlikely, however, since Boniface and Alice were first-cousins-once-removed (Boniface's mother Bertha and Alice's grandmother Adelaide were sisters), and thus far too closely related to be permitted to marry according to canon law.

Boniface married Agnes, daughter of Hugh, Count of Vermandois.

== Issue ==
Boniface and Agnes of Vermandois had:

- Manfred I of Saluzzo
- William, lord of Busca, and perhaps also Lancia
- Hugh
- Anselm, progenitor of the margraves of Ceva
- Henry, from whom the Del Carretto dynasty were descended.
- Otto Boverio, margrave of Loreto
- Boniface, 'the younger', bishop of Cortemilla
- Sybil, who married William VI of Montpellier

Boniface was also the guardian of his brother Manfred's children: Henry del Vasto, who married Flandrina, a daughter of Roger I of Sicily, and Adelaide del Vasto, who was Roger's third wife. Following Roger's death, Adelaide married Baldwin I of Jerusalem. Two of Manfred's unnamed daughters married Roger I of Sicily's sons from previous relationships, Jordan, Count of Syracuse, and Geoffrey, Count of Ragusa (who may have died before the marriage actually took place).

== Sources ==
- Previté-Orton, C.W. (1912). The Early History of the House of Savoy (1000–1233). Cambridge at the University Press.
- Malaterra, De rebus gestis Rogerii Calabriæ et Siciliæ comitis et Roberti Guiscardi ducis fratris eius, ed. E. Pontiari, Rerum Italicarum Scriptores, nuova ed. v. 5.1 (Bolgna, 1927–1928).
- R. Bordone, ‘Affermazione personale e sviluppi dinastici del gruppo parentalae aleramico: il marchese Bonifacio ‘del Vasto’,’ in Formazione e strutture dei ceti dominanti nel medioevo (Atti del I convegno di Pisa: 10–11 maggio 1983) (Rome, 1988), pp. 29–44.
- L. Provero, Dai marchesi del Vasto ai primi marchesi di Saluzzo. Sviluppi signorili entro quadri pubblici (secoli XI-XII) (Turin, 1992).
- Giuseppe Sorge, Mussomeli dall'origine all'abolizione della feudalità, vol. II, Catania 1916, poi Edizioni Ristampe Siciliane, Palermo 1982.
