= Alfonso I del Carretto =

Marquis of Finale from 1482–1499, 1514–1516 (1457–1516)

Alfonso I del Carretto (1457, in Finale Ligure – 1516, in Finale Ligure) was an Italian noble who was the Marquis of Finale from 1482 till 1499 and then again from 1514 till 1516. He was also appointed an Imperial vicar in the Holy Roman Empire from 1498.
