= Marquisate of Incisa =

Coordinates: 44°49′N 8°23′E

Marquisate of Incisa Marchesato di Incisa (Italian)
- 1161–1548
- Coat of arms

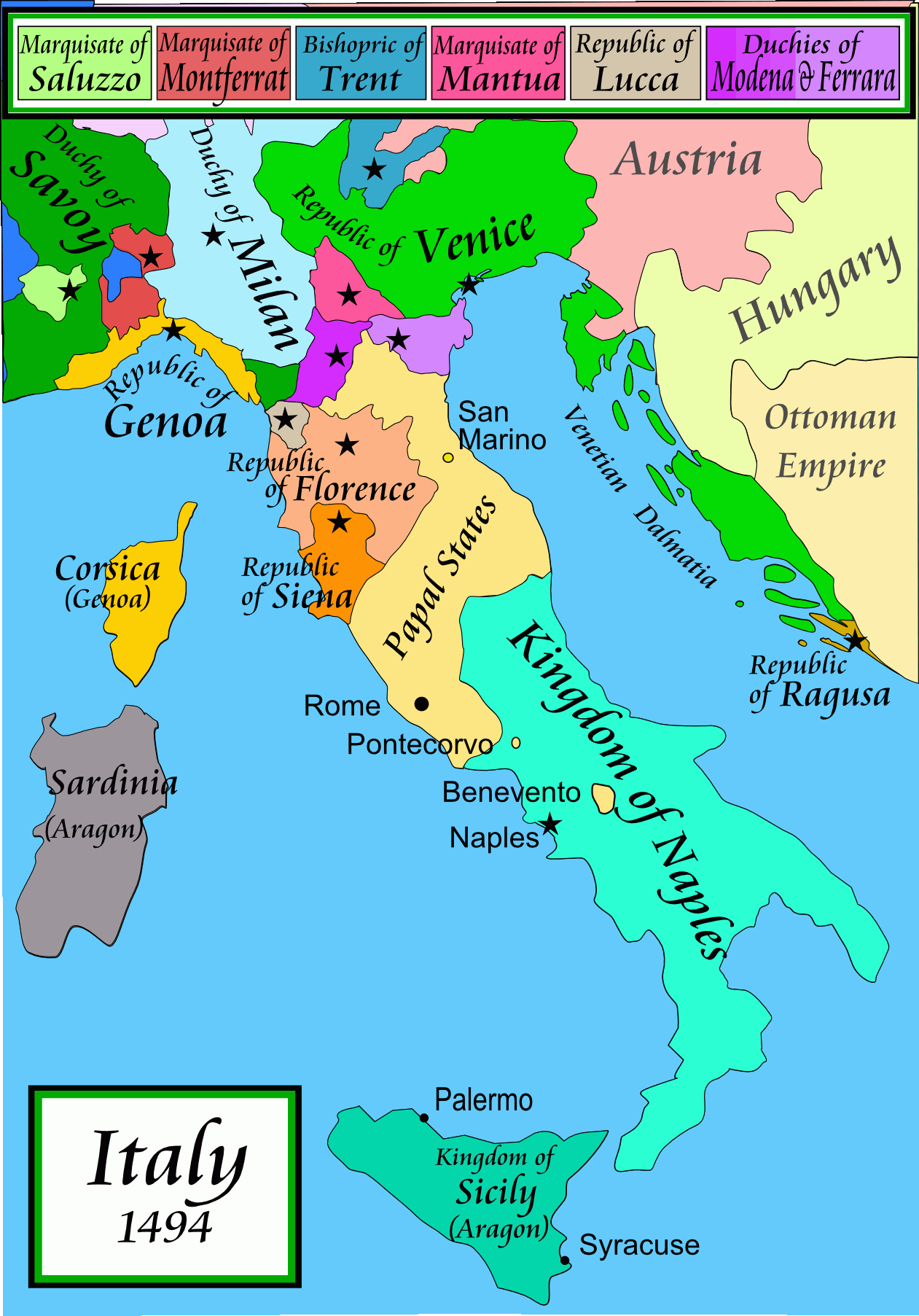
- Italy in 1494
- Capital: Incisa Scapaccino
- Common languages: Piedmont; Italian
- Religion: Roman Catholicism
- Government: Principality
- Marquisate
- Historical era: Middle Ages; Early Modern
  - Established: 1161
  - Siege by the Marquis of Montferrat: July 1514
  - Disestablished: 1548
Preceded by
Marquisate of Incisa

The Marquisate of Incisa (Marchesato di Incisa in Italian) was a lordship of the House of Aleramici in southern Piedmont, northern Italy, which existed between the 12th and 16th centuries.

== History ==
The castle of Incisa is mentioned for the first time in 984. The marquisate originated from Alberto del Vasto, a descendant of the Aleramici who had been exiled to southern Italy; here he helped Roger II of Sicily against the rebel baron, and was made count of Gravina. His son Alberto in 1161 obtained several lands near Incisa. He died in 1181 during a battle, in which his son was also severely wounded; Alberto's wife, Domicella, acted as regent. In 1189 she imprisoned two ambassadors of the Republic of Genoa, a feat which caused emperor Henry VI to transfer her fiefs to Boniface I of Montferrat; she was however able to keep her lands by allying with the commune of Asti.

In 1203 her junior sons Manfredo and Pagano obtained Montaldo and Rocchetta, starting the branch of Incisa di Rocchetta. During the Angevine wars in Piedmont of the 14th century, the marquisate of Incisa found itself in a dangerous situation, being forced to recognize the authority of Montferrat. In the following century their policy wavered from the alliance with Montferrat or with the Visconti of Milan. In 1428 marquis Petrino fought with Milan against Amadeus VIII of Savoy.

In 1497 Oddone d'Incisa was able to regain the control of the whole marquisate, which had been previously split between several branches of the family. In 1513 he allied with Charles II of Savoy to obtain the investiture as marquis of Montferrat; however, he was discovered, and Incisa was besieged and easily captured in 1514 by William IX of Montferrat. Oddone and his son Badone were executed at Nizza della Paglia. After a dispute with the emperor, Incisa was annexed to Montferrat in 1518. The marquisate was returned to the Incisa in 1536, with Giangiacomo. He died in 1545, being succeeded by his cousin Boarello II. The latter renounced to Incisa in 1548 in exchange for the territories of Camerana and Gottasecca in favour of the Gonzaga family of Milan, who were also namely marquesses of Montferrat at the time.

== Sources ==
- Pasqua, M. (2000). Il Marchesato d'Incisa dal 1514 al tramonto della feudalità in età moderna. Comune di Incisa Scapaccino.
