= Carlo Domenico del Carretto =

Catholic cardinal (1454–1514)

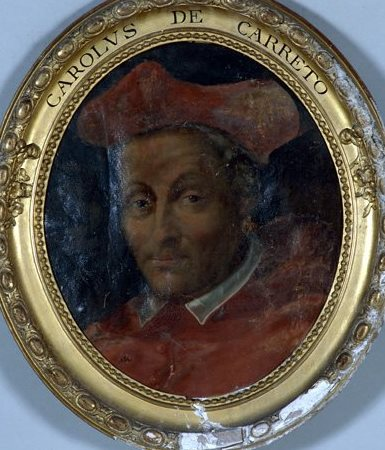
Carlo Domenico del Carretto

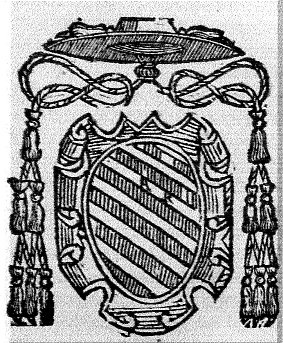
Coat of arms of Cardinal Carlo Domenico del Carretto

Carlo Domenico del Carretto (1454 – 15 August 1514) was an Italian papal legate and cardinal. He was called the Cardinal of Finale.

== Biography ==
He was born to a noble family of Finale Ligure, the son of Giovanni I Lazzarino, marquis of Finale and Noli and Viscontina Adorno, daughter of Barnaba Adorno, doge of Genoa (1447).

=== Early life and education ===
There is no information about his education. He became captain of the papal troops from 1485. Clerk of the Roman Curia until 1489, when he was promoted to episcopacy with the protection of King Louis XII of France.

=== Episcopate ===
Del Carretto was named metropolitan archbishop of Cosenza on 24 April 1489, and named administrator of Diocese of Angers on 10 October 1491 until 15 May 1499. On 16 August 1499 he was named titular bishop of Thebae (nowadays Thebes, Greece) and apostolic nuncio in France in 1503.

=== Cardinalate ===
Pope Julius II created him cardinal deacon in the consistory on 1 December 1505, and published on 12 December that year with the deaconry of Ss Vito e Modesto. He was promoted cardinal priest with the title of San Nicola fra le Immagini (suppressed title since 13 April 1587) on 4 January 1507, and appointed metropolitan archbishop to the see of Reims on 16 September 1507. Soon after, on 5 April 1509, he was transferred to the metropolitan see of Tours. Named legate in France, he participated in the 1513 papal conclave. In the Consistory held by Pope Leo X Caretto exercised his option for the title of Santa Cecilia in Trastevere. A month before his death Pope Leo transferred him to the see of Cahors. Cardinal del Carretto died on 15 August 1514 in Rome. He was buried in his titular church, S. Cecilia.
