= Calvisia =

Calvisia may refer to:

- Calvisia gens, a Roman family called gens Calvisia
- Calvisia (insect), a genus of stick insects in the subfamily Necrosciinae

== See also ==
- Calvisio, a frazione (and parish) of the municipality of Finale Ligure, in Liguria, northern Italy
