= Renato Castellani =

Italian film director and screenwriter

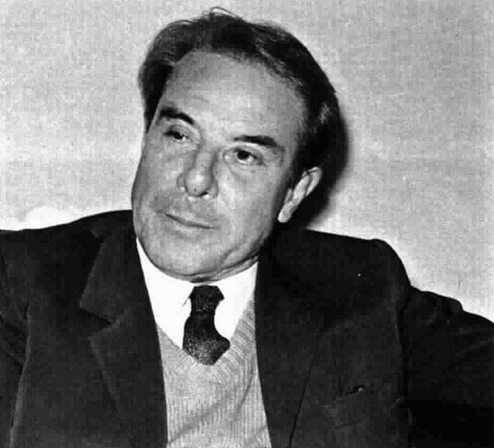
- Born: 4 September 1913; Varigotti, Finale Ligure, Kingdom of Italy
- Died: 28 December 1985 (aged 72); Rome, Italy
- Occupations: Director; screenwriter
- Notable work: Under the Sun of Rome Two Cents Worth of Hope Romeo and Juliet

Renato Castellani (4 September 1913 – 28 December 1985) was an Italian film director and screenwriter.

== Early life ==
Son of a representative of Kodak, he was born in Varigotti, at the time a hamlet of Final Pia, which became Finale Ligure (Savona) in 1927, where his mother had returned from Argentina to give birth to his son. He spent his childhood in Argentina, in the city of Rosario. After 12 years, he returned to Liguria and resumed his studies in Genoa. He moved to Milan, where he graduated from the Polytechnic University in architecture. In Milan he met Livio Castiglioni and together they aired for GUF (Fascist University Group) L'ora radiofonica and La fontana malata by Aldo Palazzeschi, experimenting with new techniques for sound editing on radio.

== Career ==
He began collaborating in 1936 as a military consultant for The Great Appeal, a film by Mario Camerini. He worked as a film critic and worked - as a screenwriter or assistant director - with important names of the Italian cinema of the time, such as Augusto Genina, with whom he signed the script for Castles in the air (1939), by Mario Soldati, of which he was assistant director on the set of Malombra (1942). He then worked with the director Alessandro Blasetti, signing the screenplays of his movies An Adventure of Salvator Rosa (1939), The Iron Crown (1941), Four Steps in the Clouds (1942) and with the director Camillo Mastrocinque, signing the screenplay of The Cuckoo Clock (1938).

His first work as a director was A Pistol Shot (1942), based on a story by Aleksandr Puskin, in which Alberto Moravia also took part in the screenplay, with Fosco Giachetti and Assia Noris. This movie, as well as the subsequent Zazà (1942), fit into the caligraphism genre.

With Under the Sun of Rome (1948), It's Forever Springtime (1950), both shot outdoors with non-professional actors, and especially Two Cents Worth of Hope (1952), Castellani gave rise to a new genre, defined as "pink neorealism", considered by critics at the time as the downward trend of neorealism, but destined to a vast audience success.

With Two Cents Worth of Hope, he won the ex aequo Grand Prix at the 1952 Cannes Film Festival. With Romeo and Juliet (1954), he won the Golden Lion at the 1954 Venice Film Festival.

After some other significant films such as Dreams in a Drawer (1957) and The Brigand (1961), Castellani devoted himself mainly to biopics in episodes shot for television, widely followed, such as The Life of Leonardo da Vinci (1971) and The Life of Verdi (1982).

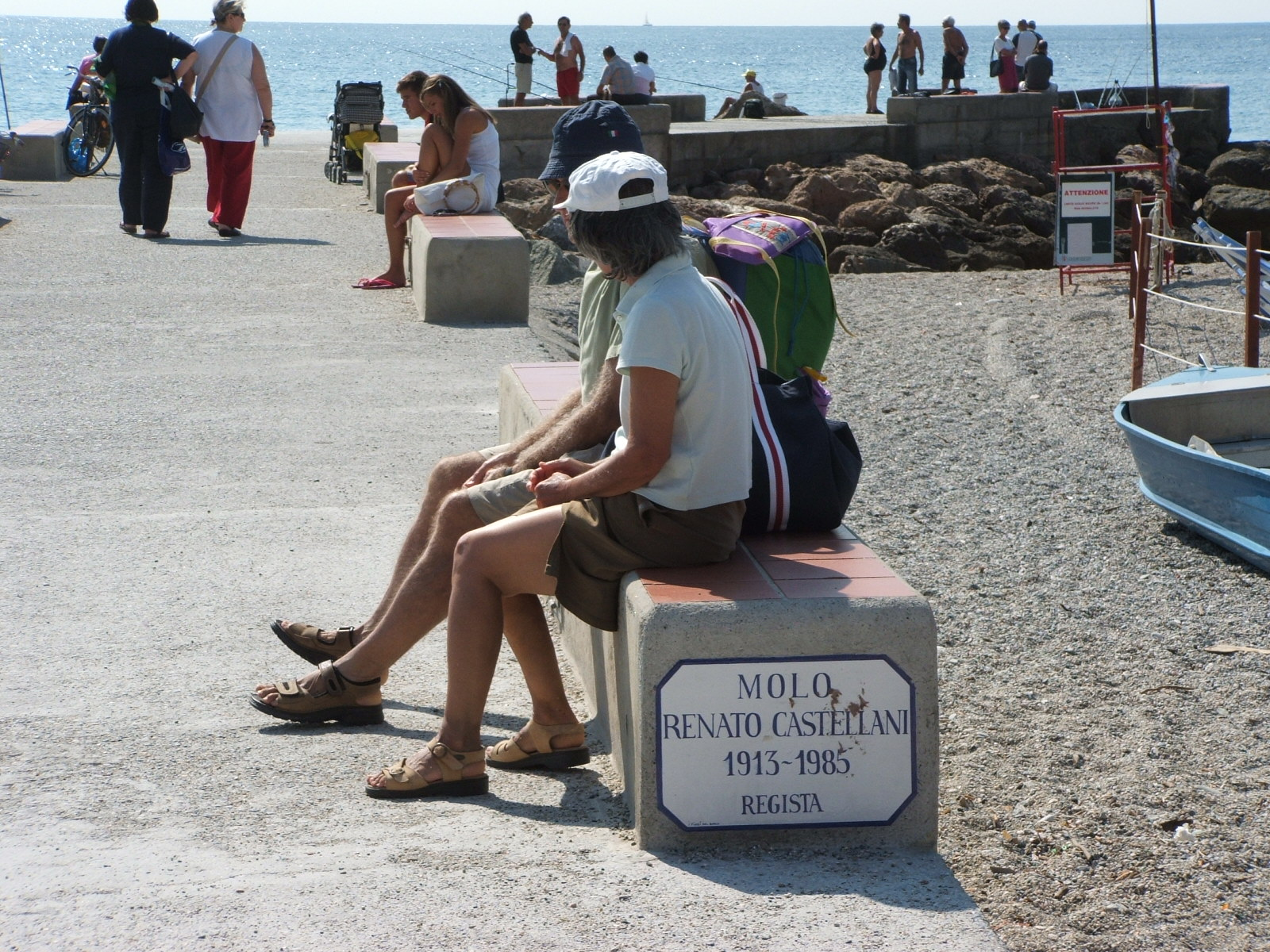
The pier dedicated to Castellani in the town of Varigotti, his birthplace

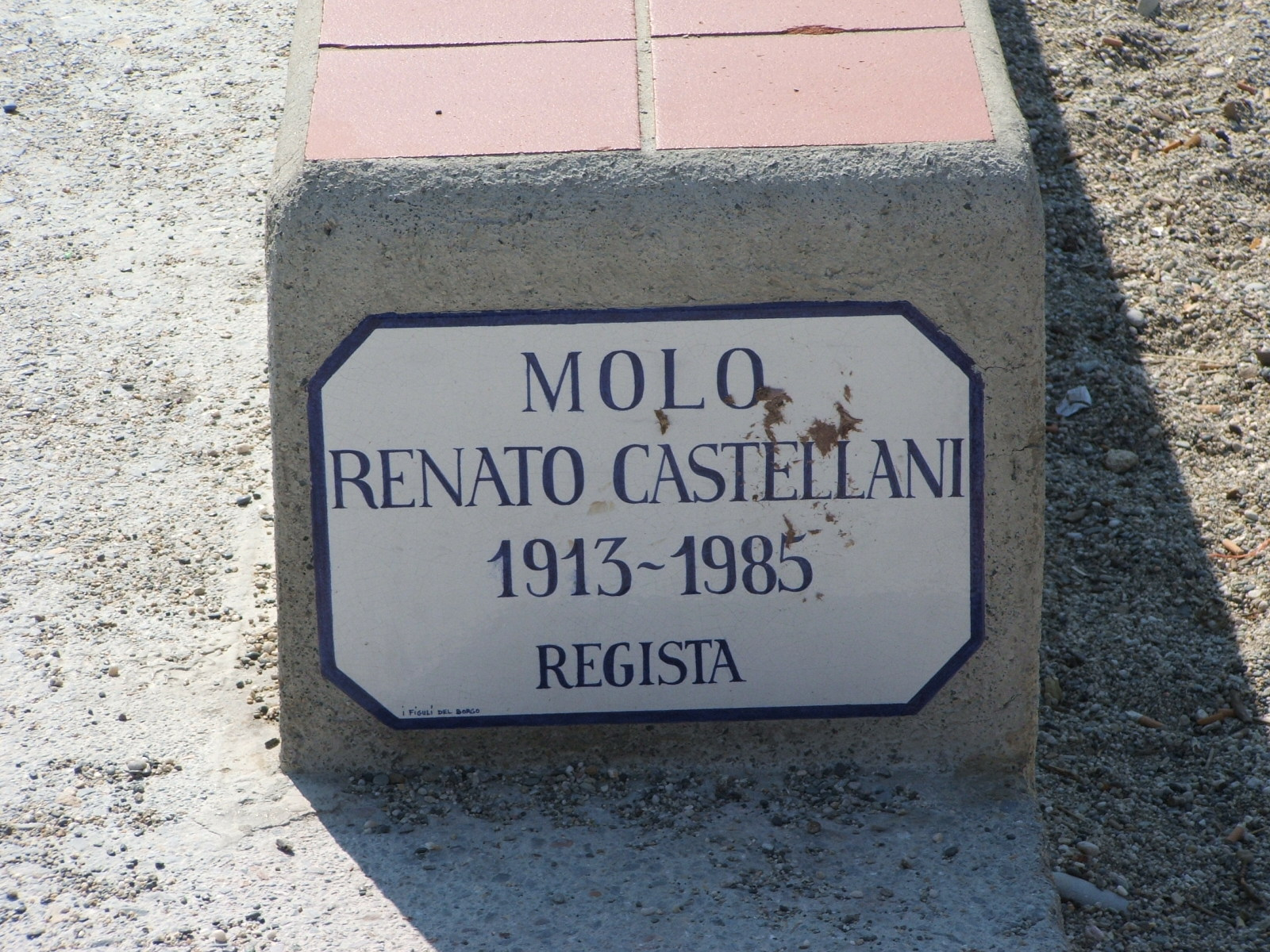
Plate of the pier

== Filmography ==
=== Film ===
Year	Title	Director	Writer
1938	The Cuckoo Clock	No	Yes
1938	Unknown of Monte Carlo	No	Yes
1939	Two Million for a Smile	No	Yes
1939	Heartbeat	No	Yes
1939	Department Store	No	Yes
1939	The Document	No	Yes
1939	Castles in the Air	No	Yes
1939	The Knight of San Marco	No	Yes
1940	One Hundred Thousand Dollars	No	Yes
1940	A Romantic Adventure	No	Yes
1940	An Adventure of Salvator Rosa	No	Yes
1941	The Jester's Supper	No	Yes
1941	The Iron Crown	No	Yes
1942	Malombra	No	Yes
1942	A Pistol Shot	Yes	Yes
1942	Zazà	Yes	Yes
1943	The Woman of the Mountain	Yes	Yes
1943	In High Places	No	Yes
1946	Malìa	No	Yes
1946	Professor, My Son	Yes	Yes
1948	Under the Sun of Rome	Yes	Yes
1948	Fabiola	No	Yes
1950	It's Forever Springtime	Yes	Yes
1950	Romanticismo	No	Yes
1952	Two Cents Worth of Hope	Yes	Yes
1954	Romeo and Juliet	Yes	Yes
1957	Dreams in a Drawer	Yes	Yes
1959	...And the Wild Wild Women	Yes	Yes
1961	The Brigand	Yes	Yes
1963	Mad Sea	Yes	Yes
1964	Marriage Italian Style	No	Yes
1964	Countersex	Yes	Yes
1964	Three Nights of Love	Yes	Yes
1967	Ghosts - Italian Style	Yes	Yes
1969	The Archangel	No	Yes
1969	Brief Season	Yes	Yes

=== Television ===
- The Life of Leonardo da Vinci (Rai, 1971)
- Il furto della Gioconda (Rai, 1978)
- The Life of Verdi (Rai, 1982)

== Theater ==
- Blithe Spirit, by Noël Coward, Rome, Teatro delle Arti, December 1945

== See also ==
- Cinema of Italy
- Neorealism
- Caligraphism
- Luciano Emmer
- Steno

== Bibliography ==
- Brunetta, Gian Piero (2003). Guida alla storia del cinema italiano (1905-2003) (in Italian). Turin: Einaudi. ISBN 9788806164850.
- Brunetta, Gian Piero (2009). Il cinema neorealista italiano. Da "Roma città aperta" a "I soliti ignoti" (in Italian). Rome: Laterza. ISBN 9788842089124.
- Brunetta, Gian Piero (2009). Il cinema neorealista italiano: storia economica, politica e culturale (in Italian). Rome: Laterza. ISBN 9788842089452.
- Sacchettini, Rodolfo (2011). La radiofonica arte invisibile. Il radiodramma italiano prima della televisione (in Italian). Corazzano (Pisa): Titivillus. ISBN 9788872183151.

== Externals links ==
- "Renato Castellani - IMDb". IMDb. Archived from the original on 24 May 2022.
