= Finale Ligure =

- Comune
- Comune di Finale Ligure
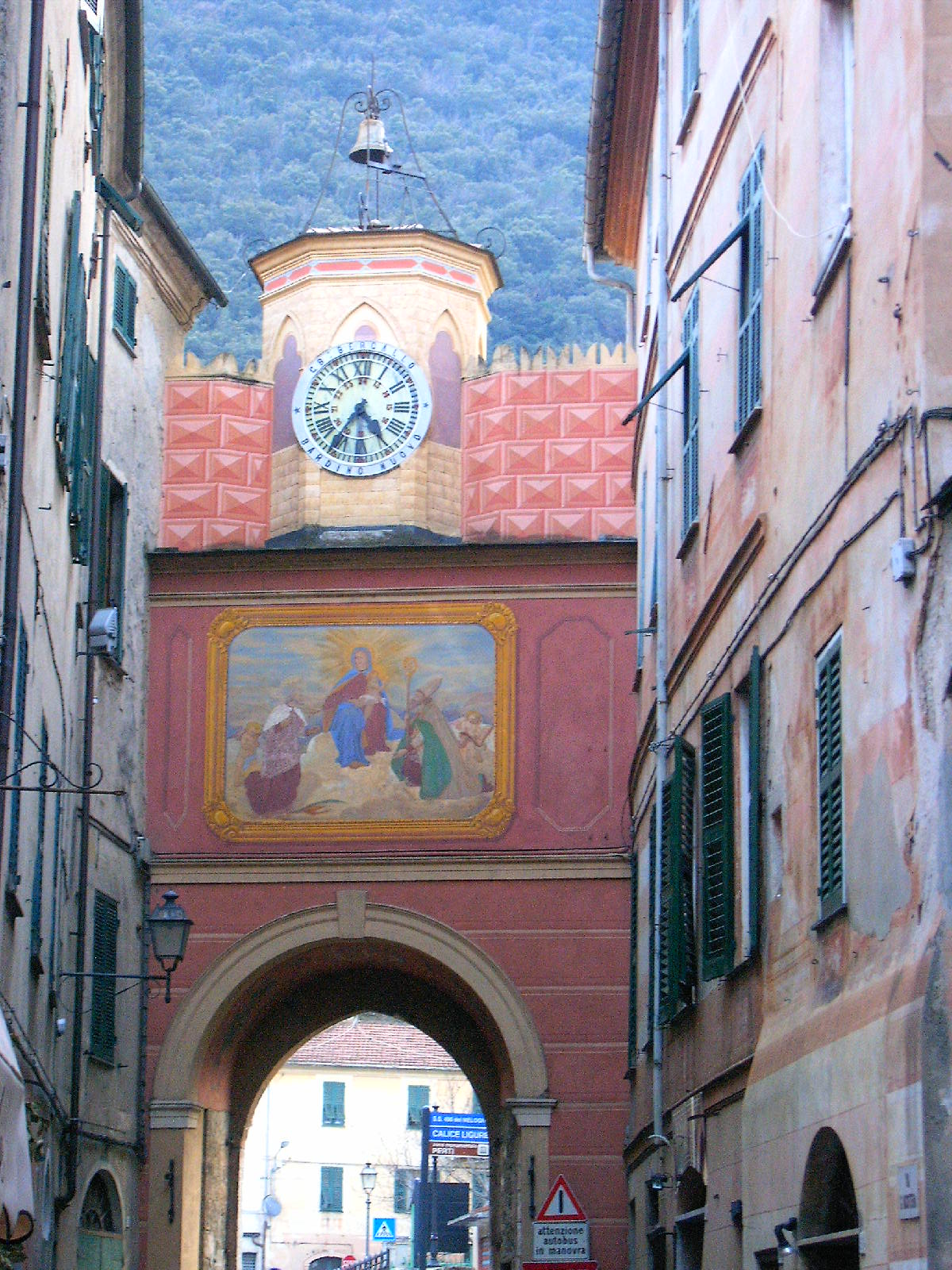
- A frescoed gate in Finale Ligure

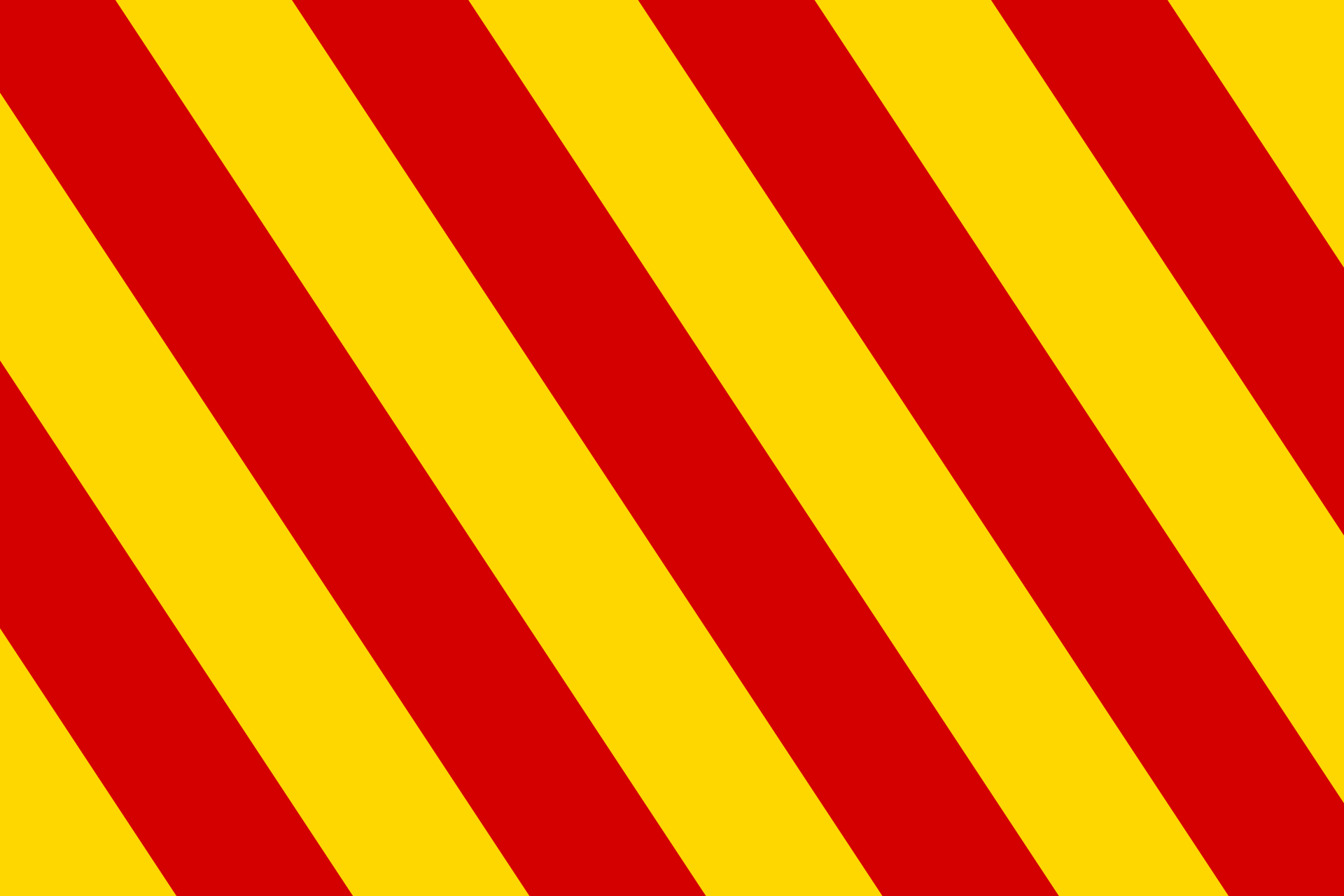
- Flag Coat of arms

- Location within Italy Location within Liguria
- Coordinates: 44°10′17″N 8°20′40″E
- Country: Italy
- Region: Liguria
- Province: Savona (SV)
- Frazioni: Gorra, Olle, Varigotti, Calvisio, Perti, San Bernardino, le Mànie, Selva, Verzi, Monticello

Government
  - Mayor: Ugo Frascherelli

Area
  - Total: 34.59 km^{2} (13.36 sq mi)
- Elevation: 0 m (0 ft)

Population (30 December 2010)
  - Total: 11,638
  - Density: 336.5/km^{2} (871.4/sq mi)
- Demonym: Finalesi
- Time zone: UTC+1 (CET)
  - Summer (DST): UTC+2 (CEST)
- Postal code: 17024
- Dialing code: 019
- Patron saint: St. John the Baptist
- Saint day: June 24
- Website: Official website

Finale Ligure (Ligurian: O Finâ, locally Finô; Latin: Finarium) is a comune on the Gulf of Genoa, in the province of Savona, in Liguria, Italy. It is considered part of the Italian Riviera. Part of its historical center ("Finalborgo") is one of I Borghi più belli d'Italia ("The most beautiful villages of Italy").

== Geography ==
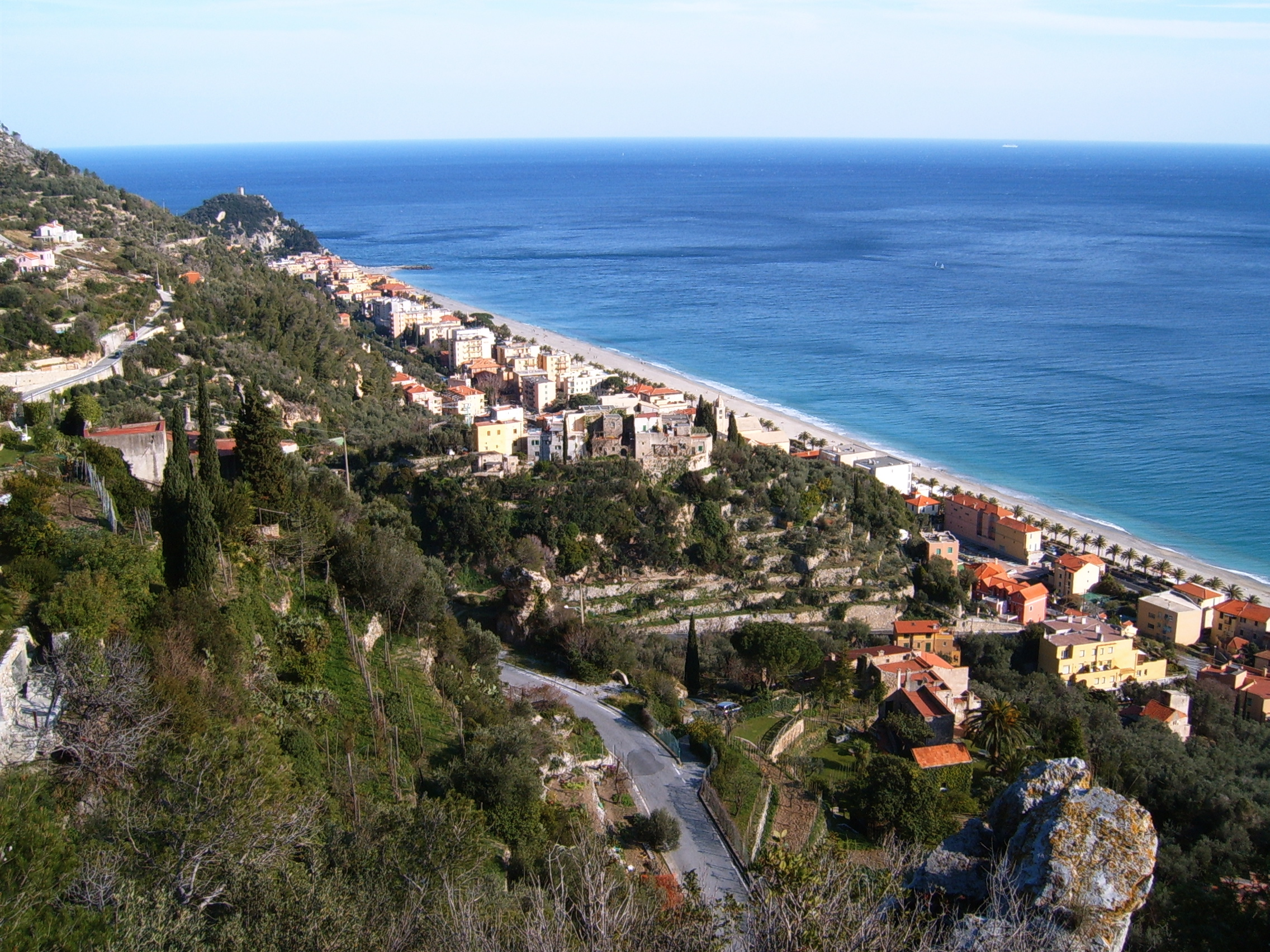
A view on the frazione of Varigotti

Known for its white sand beaches and its views, Finale Ligure is located directly adjacent to the Rock of Caprazoppa, a steep limestone mountain on the southwest, and much of the town extends up hill slopes. The town has a lively commercial district. The boardwalk is lined with palm trees and many restaurants from the adjacent street have located large, open-air dining rooms along it.

The town of Finale Ligure is nominally divided into three "boroughs". Finale Ligure Marina (Finalmarina) is the main seaside part of the town, most frequented by tourists, while Finale Pia (Finalpia) is the traditional center of the town, where a Benedictine abbey still stands. Finalborgo, the third borough and located further inland, consists of an old walled medieval town built at the junction of two streams: Aquila and Pora.

Finale Ligure has furthermore some frazioni: Varigotti, an appreciated and characteristic seaside holiday destination, which was an important port in Roman and Byzantine times; Perti, also an ancient center with Roman and Medieval ruins, up into the entroterra (interior); Le Manie (e Magne in local dialect), a plateau partly cultivated, partly left to pine forest and Mediterranean Bush; Gorra, a panoramic hamlet along the steep road to the Alpine forests of Melogno pass; San Bernardino, a recent set of buildings and residences on the top of the hill overlooking Finale Marina.

The territory surrounding Finale is known as "Il Finale", and not "Il Finalese" as sometimes wrongly spelled; it is made up of limestone plateaus and canyons which host a significant biodiversity and important remains of Roman and Medieval times.

== History ==
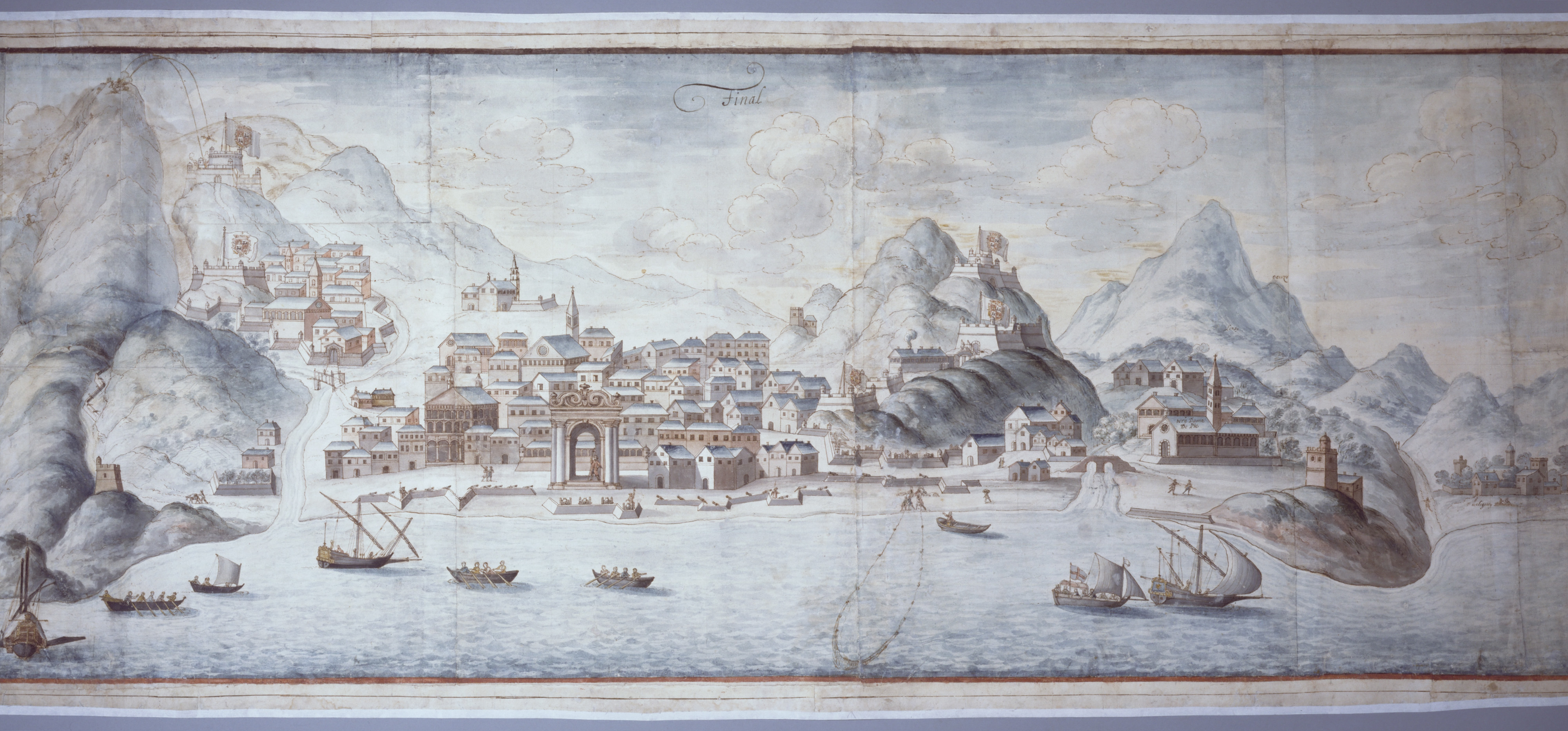
Map of Finale with the town wall, 17th century

Caves attesting the presence of human settlements in the area as early as the Neolithic age have been found. During the Roman times, the burgh of Finale was known as Ad Fines ("On the Border"), as it marked the boundary between two of the main Ligurian tribes: the Sabatii in the east, and the Intemelii in the west.

In Roman times the area hosted a road and post station named Pollupex (Pollupice, in Italian) along the via Julia Augusta; it is supposed that it was situated where nowadays the frazione of Calvisio stands. Important was in those times also the port of Varicottis (Varigotti), now interred, as were the fortifications in Perti (Castrum Perticae, active to the Middle Ages), later integrated into the Byzantine lines against the Ostrogoths and Lombards.

The first document citing the town is from 967, when it was included in the Marca Aleramica created by Emperor Otto I. Later a possession of Bonifacio Del Vasto, it was inherited by the Del Carretto who made it the base of a powerful Marquisate which they enlarged absorbing the neighbouring fiefs, and which raised the hostility of the Republic of Genoa. After various disputes, in 1385 the Del Carretto were compelled to cede most of their lands to the Genoese; their rule was however not well accepted, and a true war ensued in 1447–48, which ended with a Genoese victory.

In 1496 Alfonso I del Carretto obtained the investiture of the whole marquisate by Emperor Maximilian I, later confirmed by Charles V. In 1558, however, the misgovernment of Alfonso II Del Carretto created attrition with the population, with the encroachment of Genoa, which claimed new lands from the Emperor. The Spanish governor of Milan therefore occupied Finale in 1571, and the town passed under the Spanish rule in 1602.

The Marquisate was acquired by the Republic of Genoa in 1713, being confirmed in the possession by the Peace of Aix-la-Chapelle of 1748. The town became part of the Kingdom of Sardinia in 1815 and of the Kingdom of Italy in 1861. At that time the Finale area was divided in several small Comuni: Finalborgo (formerly known as Finario), Finalmarina, Finalpia, Gorra, Perti, Calvisio, Varigotti. Between 1869 and 1877, a time of administrative reforms, only the three Finales survived after swallowing their smaller neighbors amidst recriminations. It was the Fascist regime, bent on creating wider Comuni, to eventually unify these townships in the Comune of Finale Ligure in 1927.

== Main sights ==
- Castel Gavone, the former seat of the Del Carretto Marquesses. It was allegedly built by the Enrico II Del Carretto in 1181. Destroyed during the struggles with Genoa, it was rebuilt in 1451–52. In 1715 it was largely dismantled by the Genoese after their conquest of the Marquisate.
- Castel San Giovanni, a 17th-century Spanish fort just above the old walled town.
- Castello Vuillermin, a castle dating from the early 20th century which is now converted into a youth hostel. It sits on the mountains directly above the town.
- Basilica of St. John the Baptist (1619–75), with two bell towers from 1762.
- Church of Santa Maria di Pia, rebuilt in 1725–28. It houses works from the 16th century and has a 13th-century bell tower.
- Church of San Biagio, rebuilt in 1630–50. It has maintained an octagonal tower from the 15th century.
- Church of Sant'Eusebio, with parts in Romanesque style. Noteworthy are the Gothic apse and the 11th-century crypt.
- Church of Sant'Antonino, with a 12th-century crypt.
- Church of San Bartolomeo apostolo, in the frazione of Gorra. It has a Gothic bell tower with three floors of mullioned windows.
- Church of San Lorenzo, between Varigotti and Capo Noli. It has Romanesque bell tower from the 12th century.
- Former convent of Santa Caterina, founded in 1359 and rebuilt in Renaissance times with the addition of two cloisters. It is now home to the town museum.

== Transport ==
The town is connected by various roads (mainly the SS1, or via Aurelia), the A10 highway Genova-Ventimiglia (exit "Finale Ligure"), and a double-track rail line. The city offers also a service of public transportation, TPL (Trasporto Pubblico Locale nella Provincia di Savona, that connects the whole province of Savona.

== Twin towns ==
- Benalmádena, Spain
- Ocean City, MD, United States
- Coseano, Italy
- Racalmuto, Italy
- Montechiaro d'Asti, Italy
- Vittorio Veneto, Italy

== Famous people ==
- Carlo Domenico del Carretto (1454–1514), Roman Catholic cardinal
- Enrico Caviglia (1863–1945), Marshal of Italy
- Renato Castellani, film director and writer
- Giovanni Boine, writer
- Marco Ferrando, communist politician
- Vittorio Brumotti, TV presenter and cyclist

== See also ==
- Final Pia – a zone of Finale

== Gallery ==
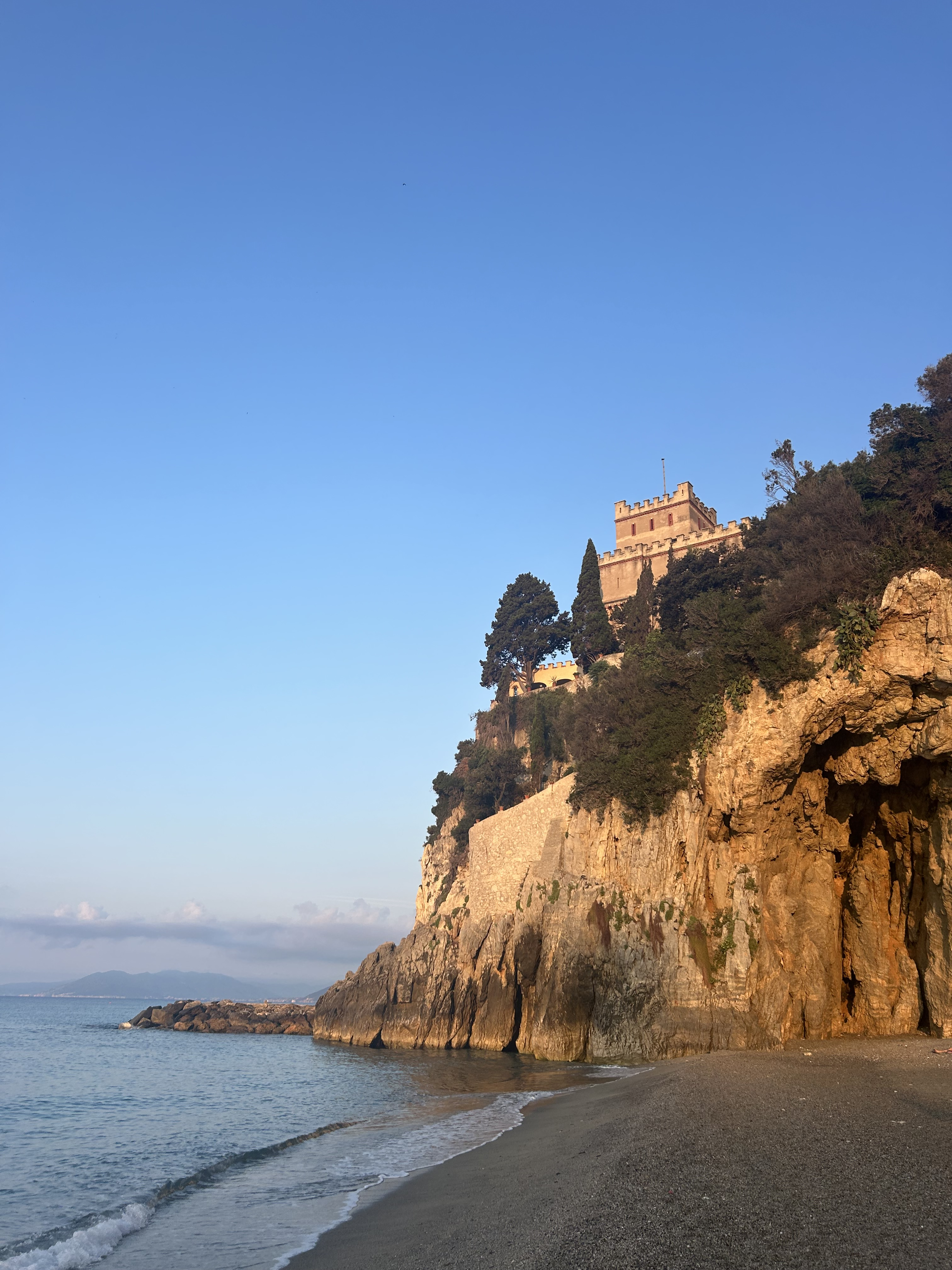
Free beach of Final Pia, Castelletto

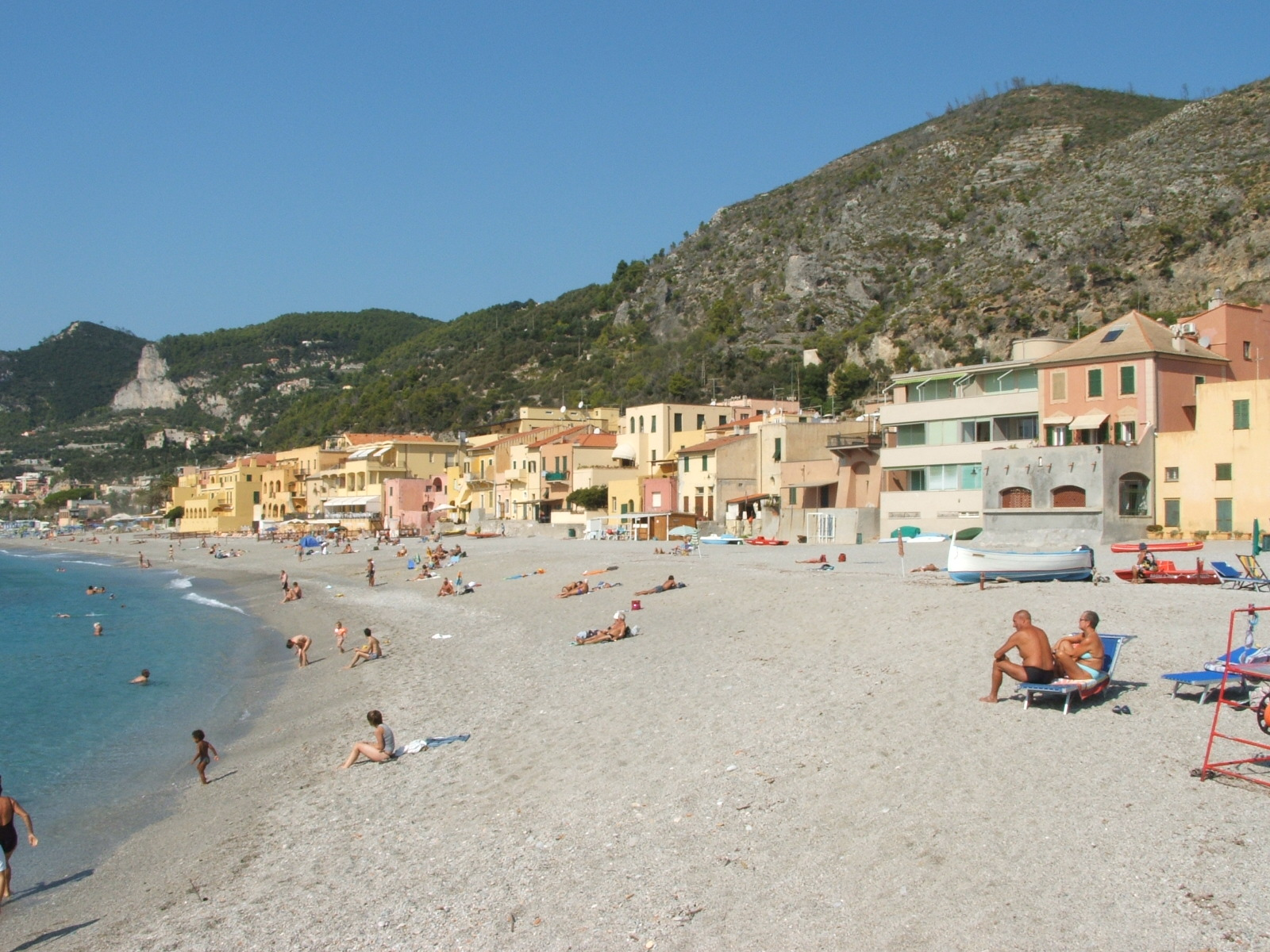
Beach of Varigotti

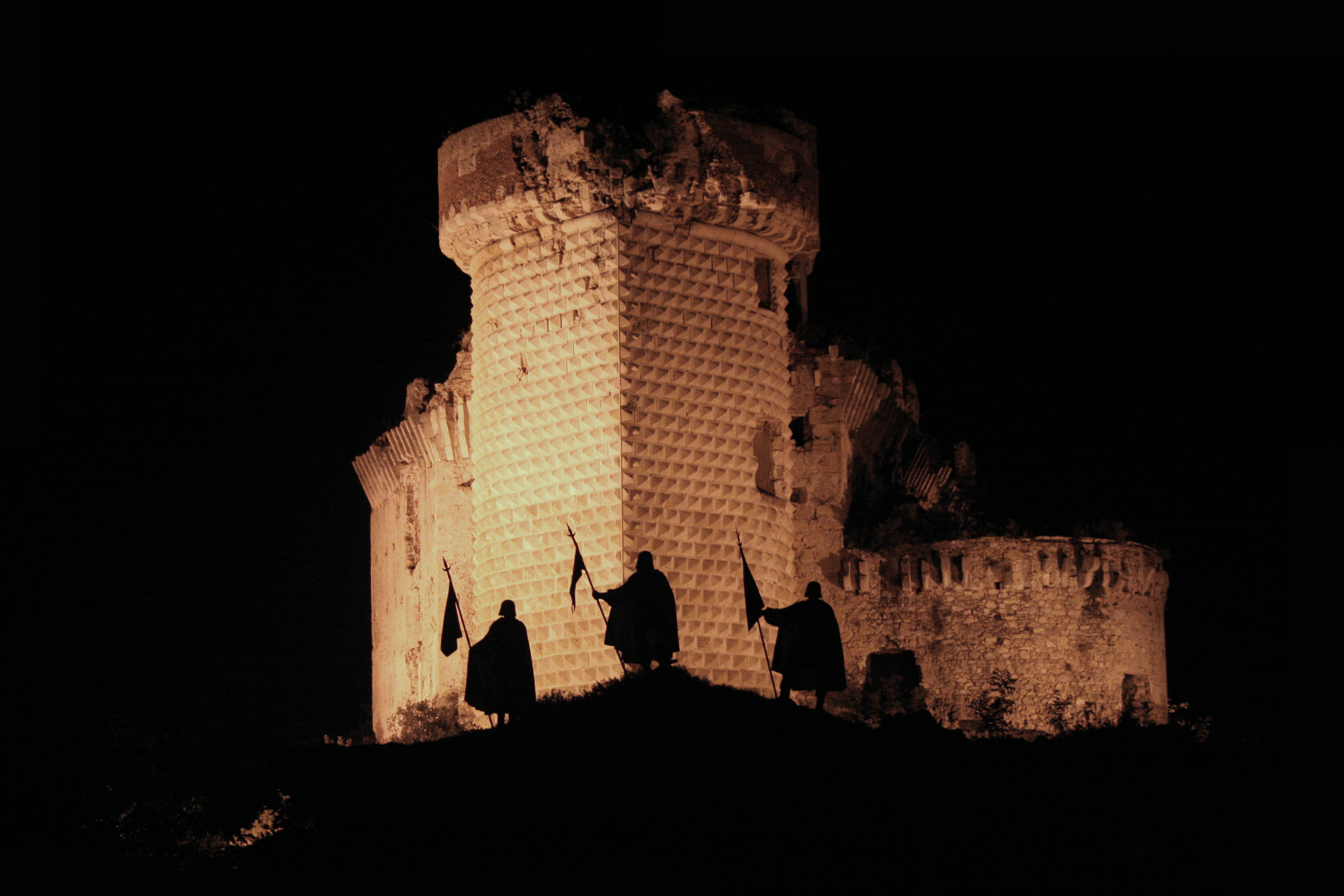
The Gavone Castle

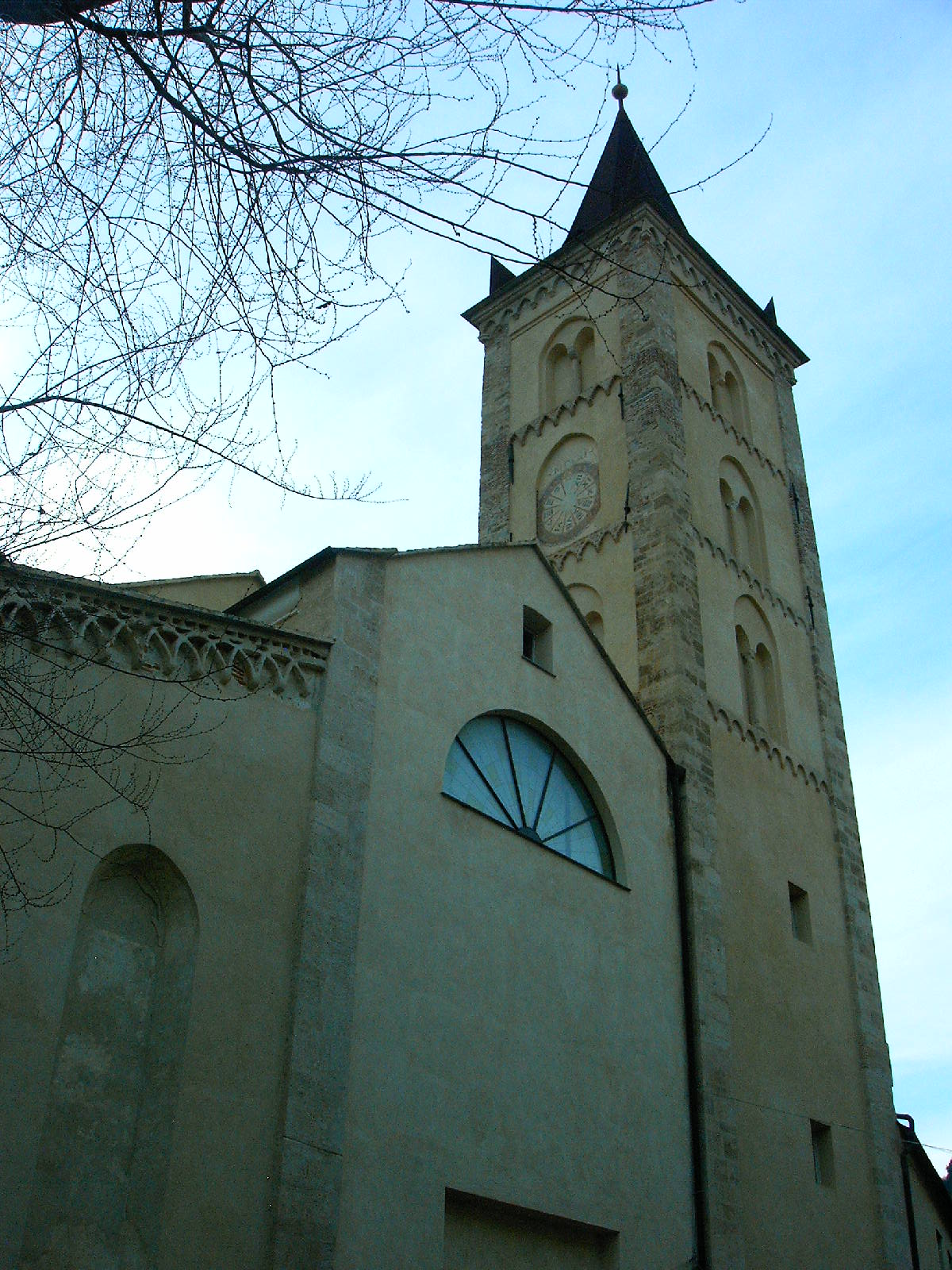
The former convent of Santa Caterina in Finalborgo

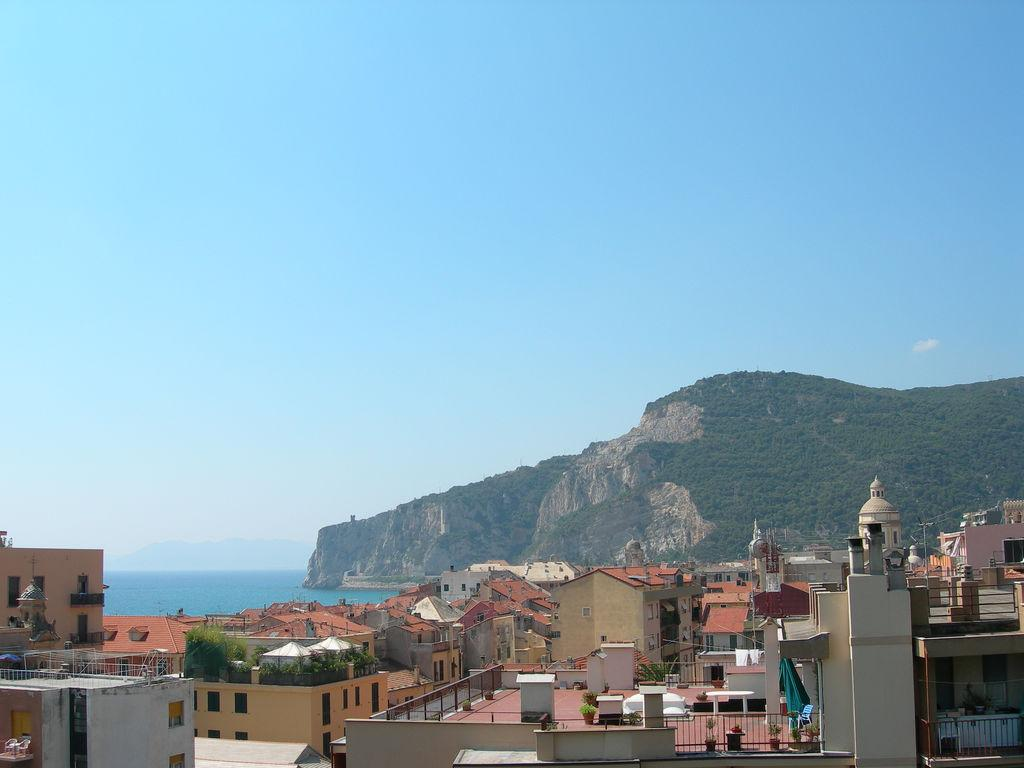
Landscape with the backdrop of the promontory Caprazoppa

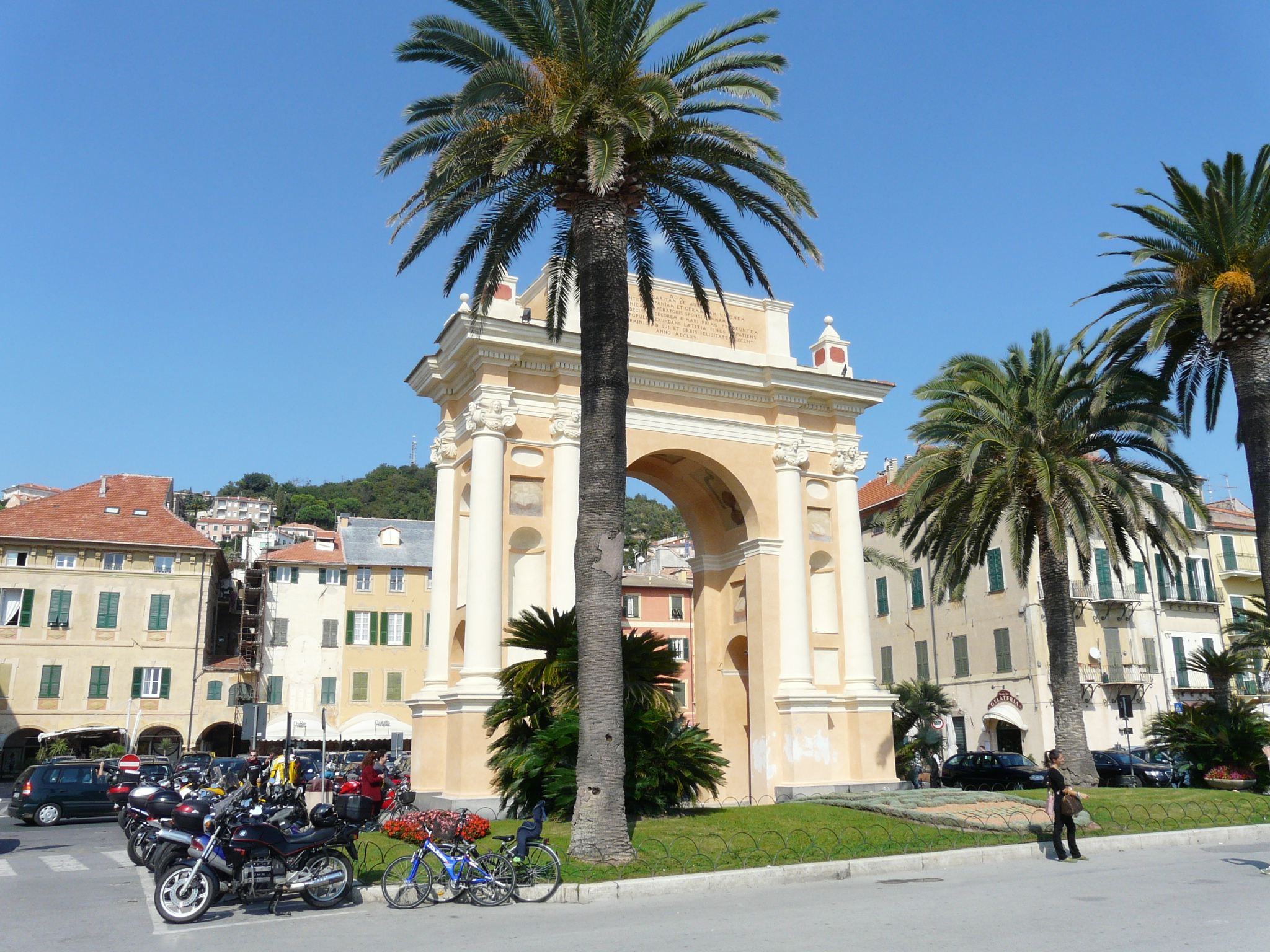
Arch dedicated to Queen Margherita of Austria

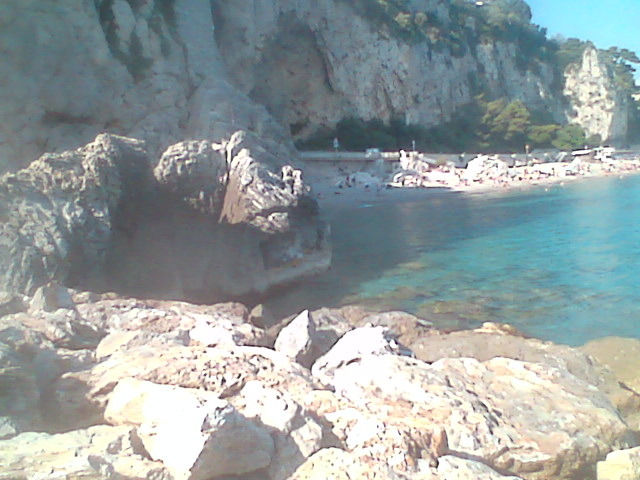
Beach of Final Pia

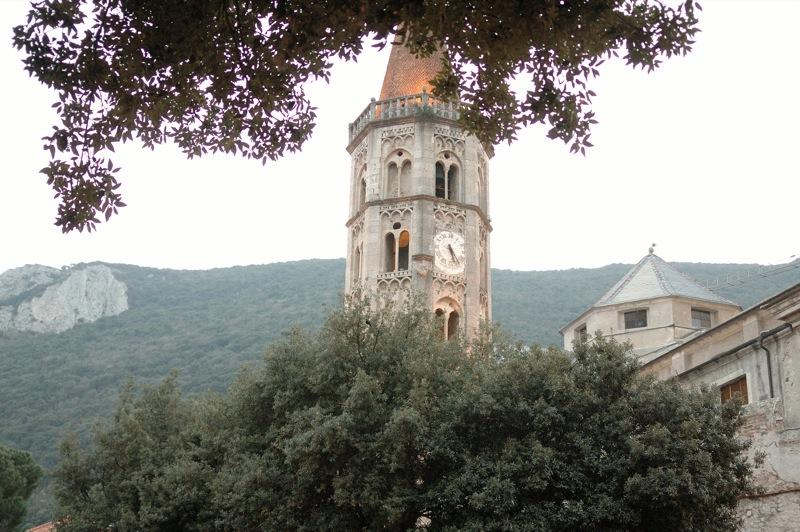
Bell Tower San Biagio in Finalborgo

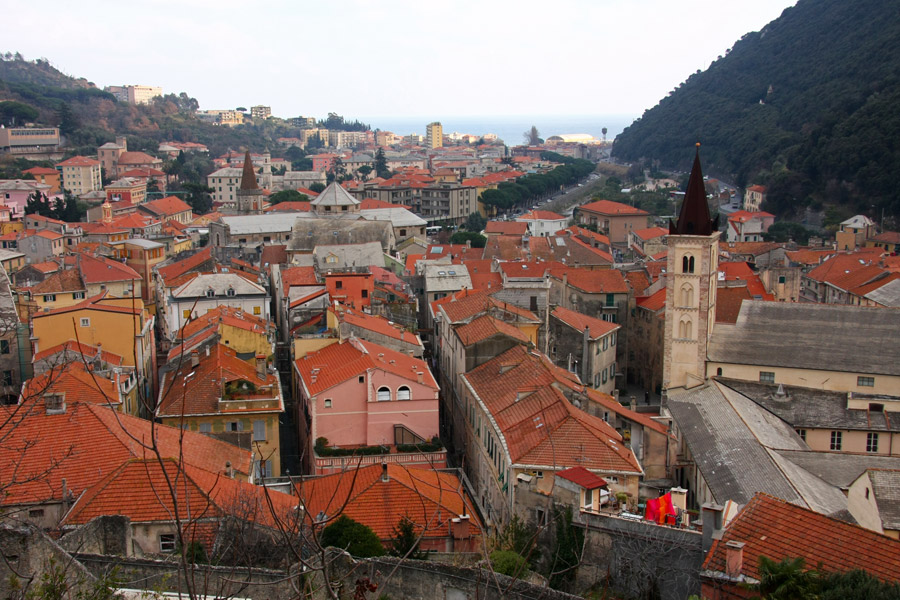
View of Finalborgo

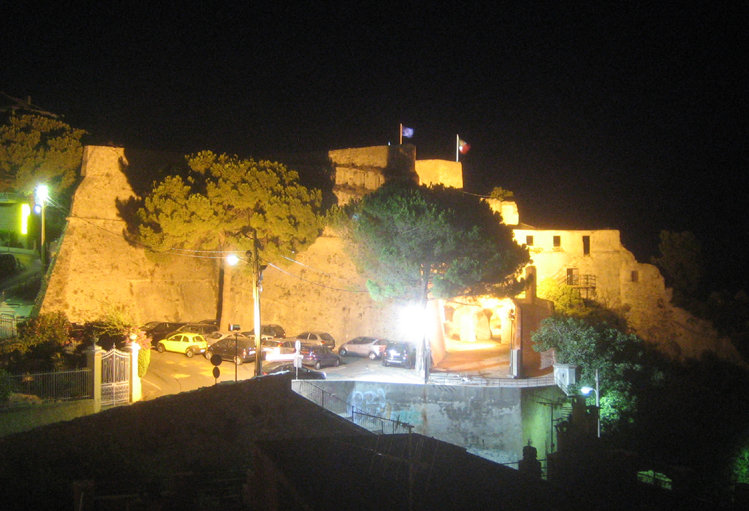
The Castelfranco

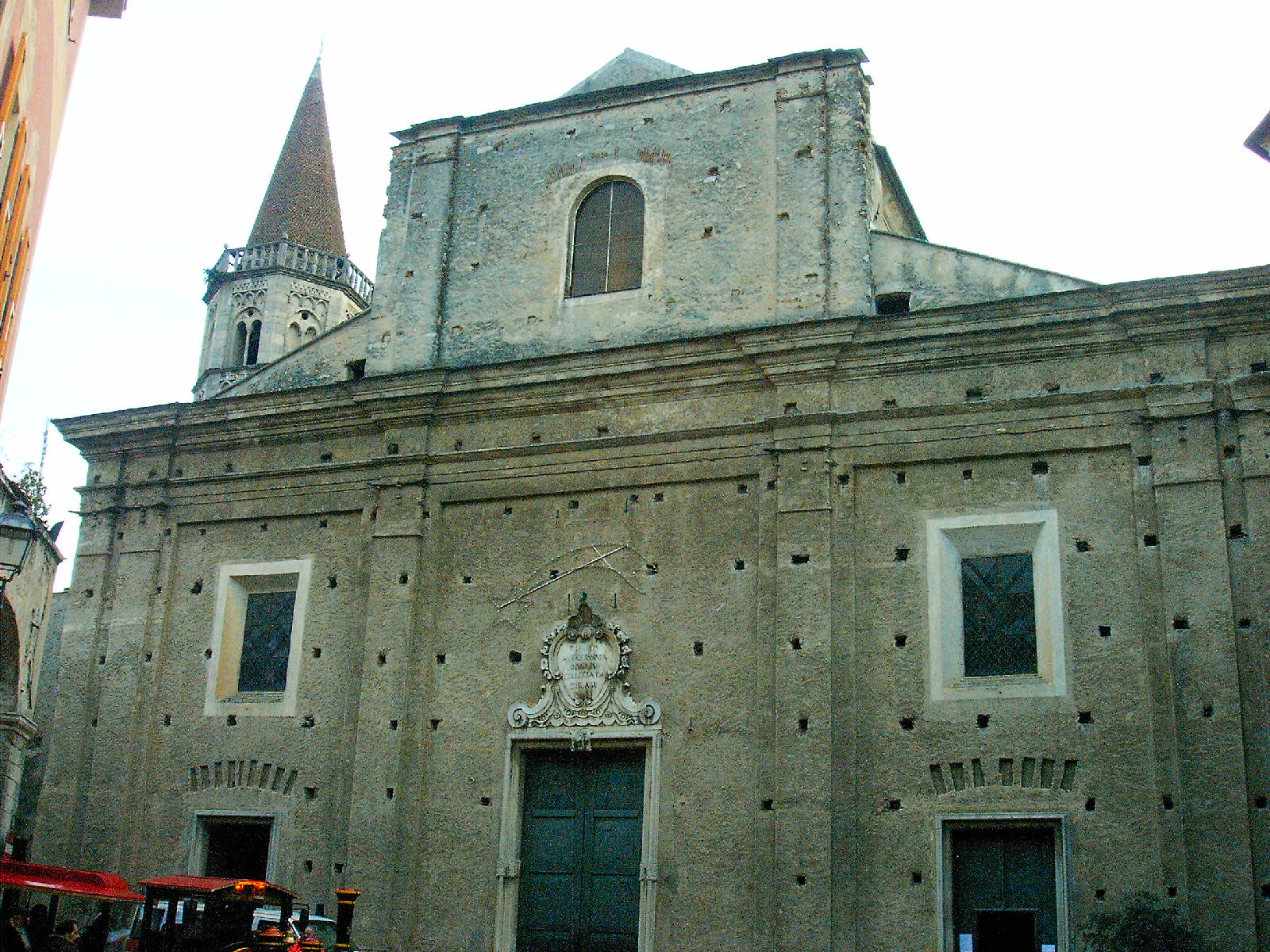
Façade of San Biagio church in Finalborgo

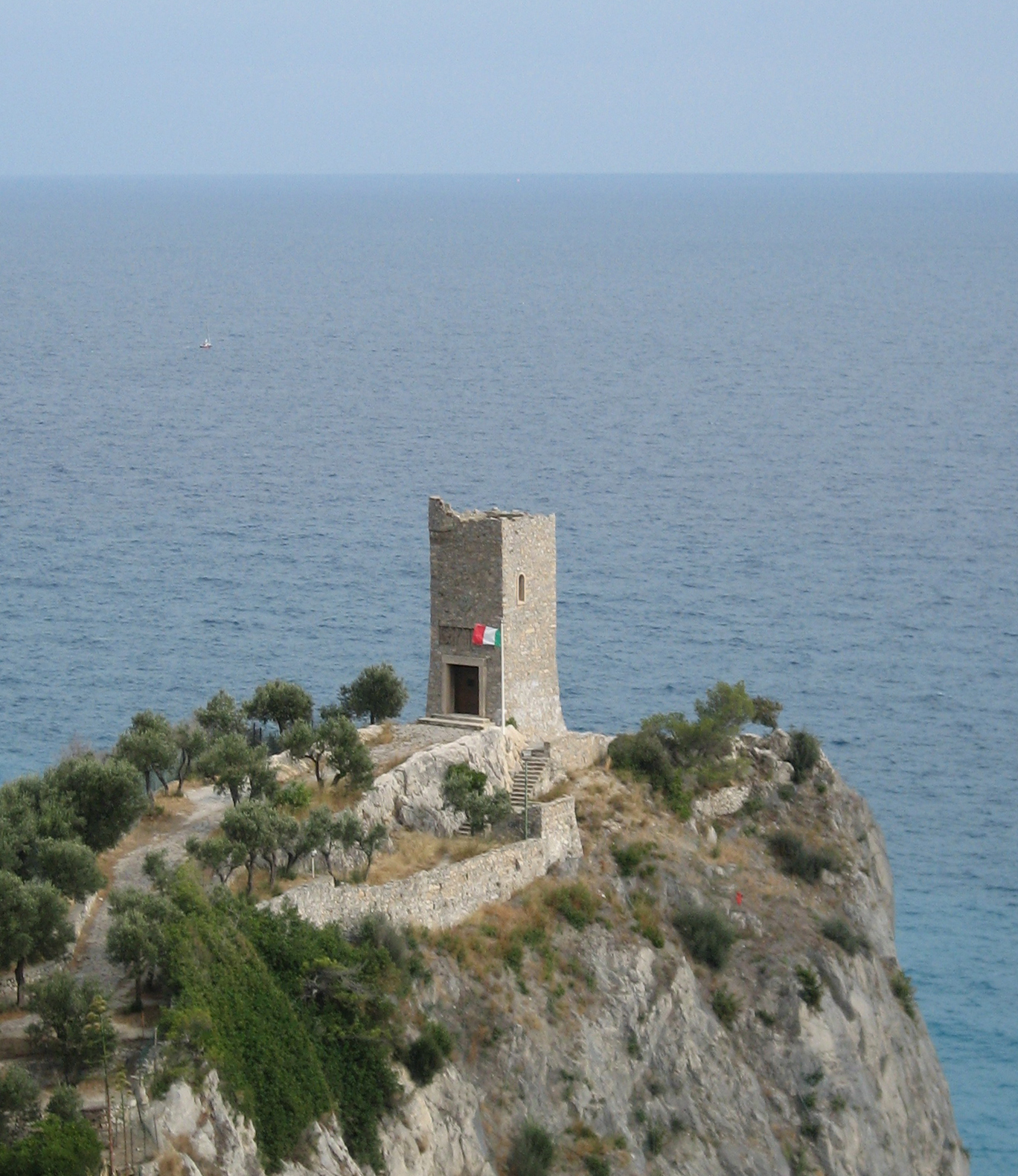
Mausoleum of General Enrico Caviglia, Cape San Donato
