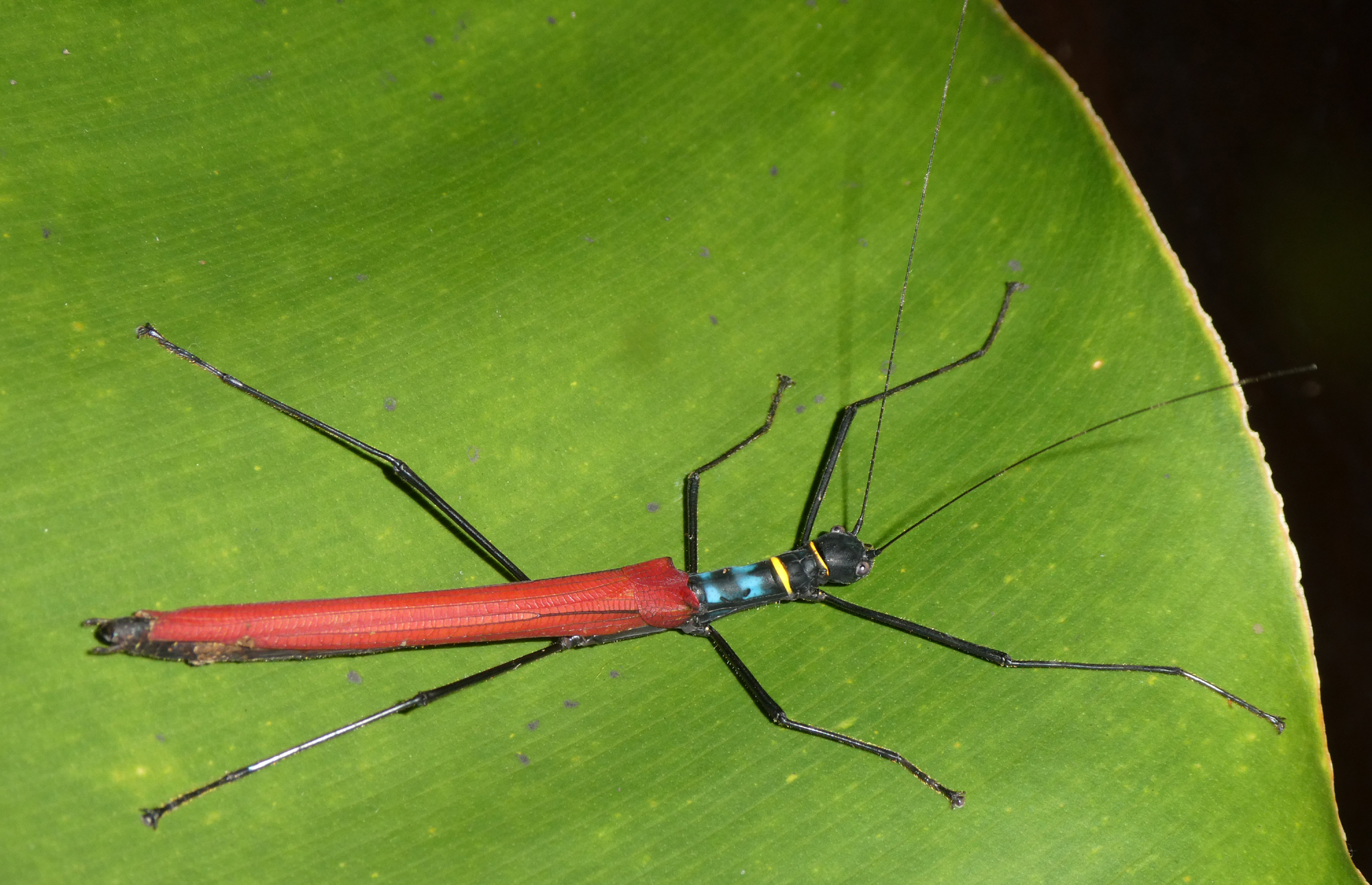
- Specimen from Cát Tiên National Park

Scientific classification
- Kingdom: Animalia
- Phylum: Arthropoda
- Class: Insecta
- Order: Phasmatodea
- Family: Lonchodidae
- Genus: Calvisia
- Subgenus: Calvisia
- Species: C. kneubuehleri

Binomial name
- Calvisia kneubuehleri Bresseel & Constant, 2017

= Calvisia kneubuehleri =

Species of stick insect

Calvisia kneubuehleri is a species of stick insects in the tribe Necrosciini: called the Picasso stick insect by the authors. This species was found in the seasonal tropical forests of the Dong Nai Biosphere Reserve (type locality), which includes Cát Tiên National Park, Vietnam.

Then undescribed, the species (female) has been photographed by the Russian ornithologists Andrei V. Zinoviev 13/04/2001 in Ma Da Enterprise, Dong Nai Province.

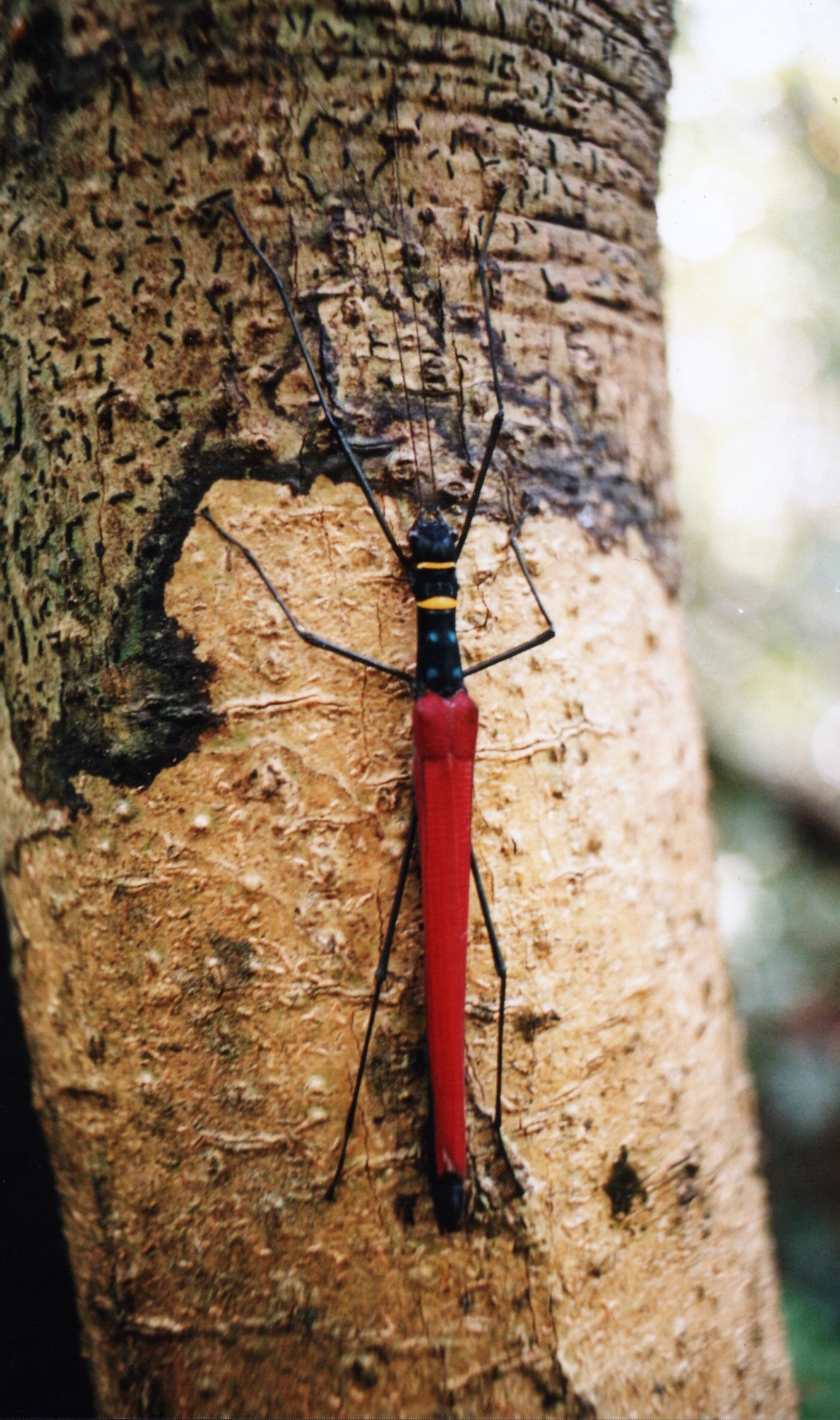
Female of Calvisia kneubuehleri, photographed by Andrei V. Zinoviev in Ma Da Enterprise, Dong Nai Province on 13/04/2001.
