= Final Pia =

- Quarter of Finale Ligure
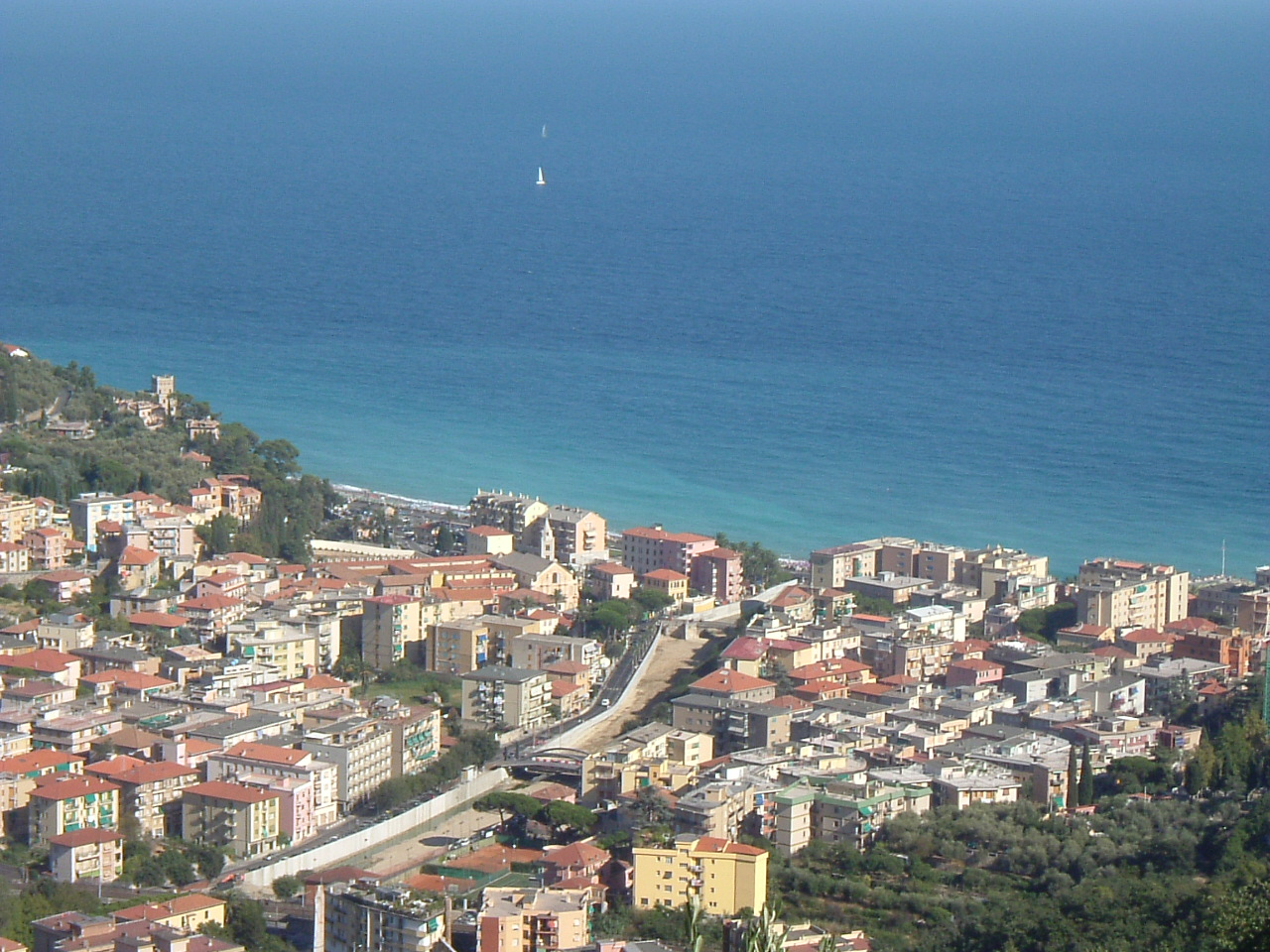
- Interactive map of Final Pia
- Coordinates: 44°10′17″N 8°20′40″E
- Country: Italy
- Region: Liguria
- Province: Savona
- Comune: Finale Ligure
- Zone: Final Pia
- Time zone: UTC+1 (CET)
  - Summer (DST): UTC+2 (CEST)
- Postal code: 17024

Final Pia or Finale Pia is one of three units forming the Ligurian town of Finale Ligure, near Savona, northern Italy. An independent municipality until 1927, it was later merged with Finale Marina and Finalborgo to form the modern town of Finale Ligure. The village is situated along the Via Aurelia, however, most of the buildings face the banks of the river Sciusa, especially after the big residential development in the postwar period, expansion that has effectively united the center of the inner Finale Pia Calvisio frazione, at about one kilometer from the coast.

== History ==
The old town developed around the church of Santa Maria Pia in medieval times. Like other centers of Finale, Finale Pia was part of Marquisate of Finale under the Del Carretto, the Kingdom of Spain and Republic of Genoa, until it was annexed to Piedmont-Sardinia in the 19th century.

== Gallery ==
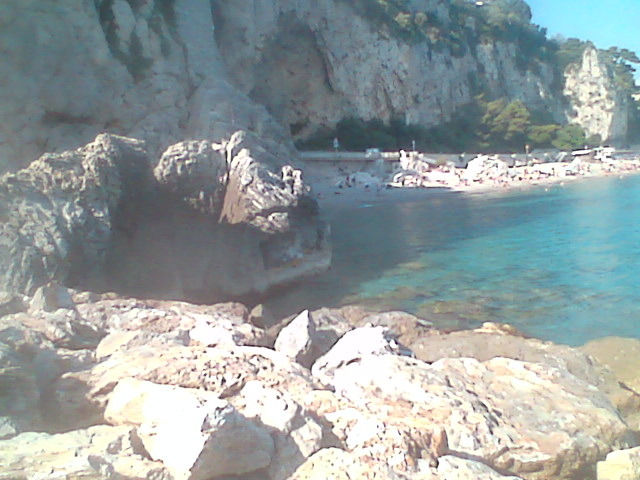
The Beach

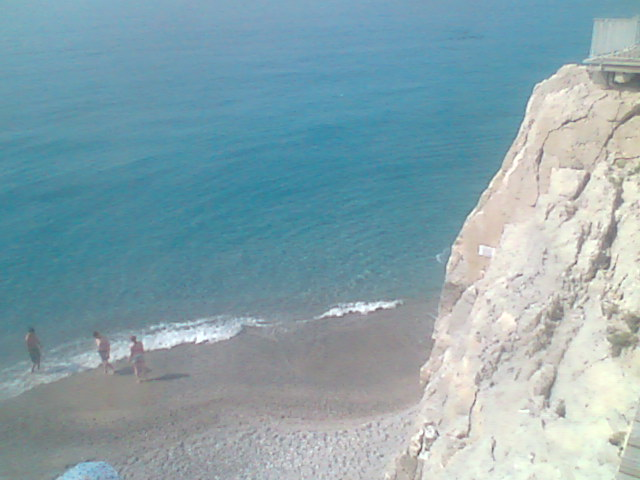
A view of the Beach near Port of San Donato

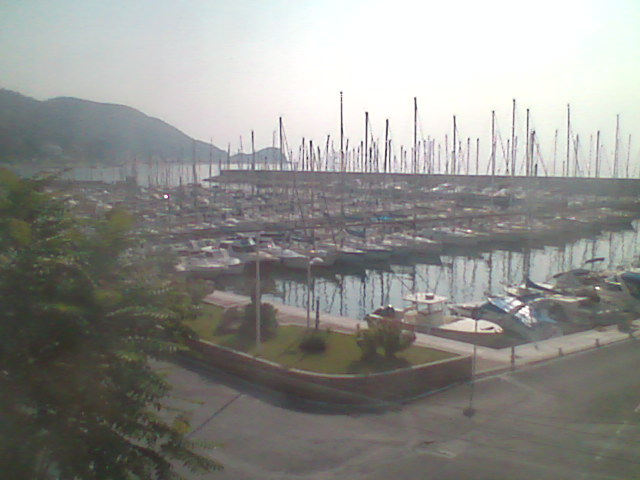
The Port of San Donato
