= Perti =

Perti may refer to:

== People ==
- a family name originating in Italy
  - Giacomo Antonio Perti, an Italian Baroque composer
  - Giovanni Pietro Perti, a Baroque architect and sculptor who had worked in the Grand Duchy of Lithuania

== Places ==
- Perti, fraction of the municipality (comune) of Finale Ligure, in the Province of Savona, Italy

== Organizations ==
- the Islamic Education Movement (Pergerakan Tarbijah Islamijah), a defunct political party in Indonesia
