= Dreams in a Drawer =

- Directed by: Renato Castellani
- Written by: Renato Castellani; Adriana Chiaromonte
- Starring: Lea Massari
- Cinematography: Leonida Barboni
- Music by: Roman Vlad
- Release date: 1957
- Language: Italian

Dreams in a Drawer (Italian: I sogni nel cassetto) is a 1957 Italian romantic drama film written and directed by Renato Castellani and starring Lea Massari.

== Plot ==
Mario and Lucia, two young students from the University of Pavia, fall in love. Lucia's father decides that the girl interrupts her studies and returns to the country waiting for the wedding, to be celebrated after Mario's graduation. The two young men therefore decide to get married. Their happiness will be short-lived: Lucia will die in giving birth to a girl.

== Cast ==
- Lea Massari as Lucia Moretti
- Enrico Pagani as Mario Bonelli
- Lilla Brignone as Antonietta, Lucia's Mother
- Sergio Tofano as Lucia's Father
- Carlo D'Angelo as The Substitute
- Cosetta Greco as Lina
- Armando Anzelmo as Monsignor
- Guglielmo Inglese as The Neurology Professor
- Adriana Facchetti as The Landlady
- Guido Celano as The Hospital Doctor
