= Calvisio =

- Frazione
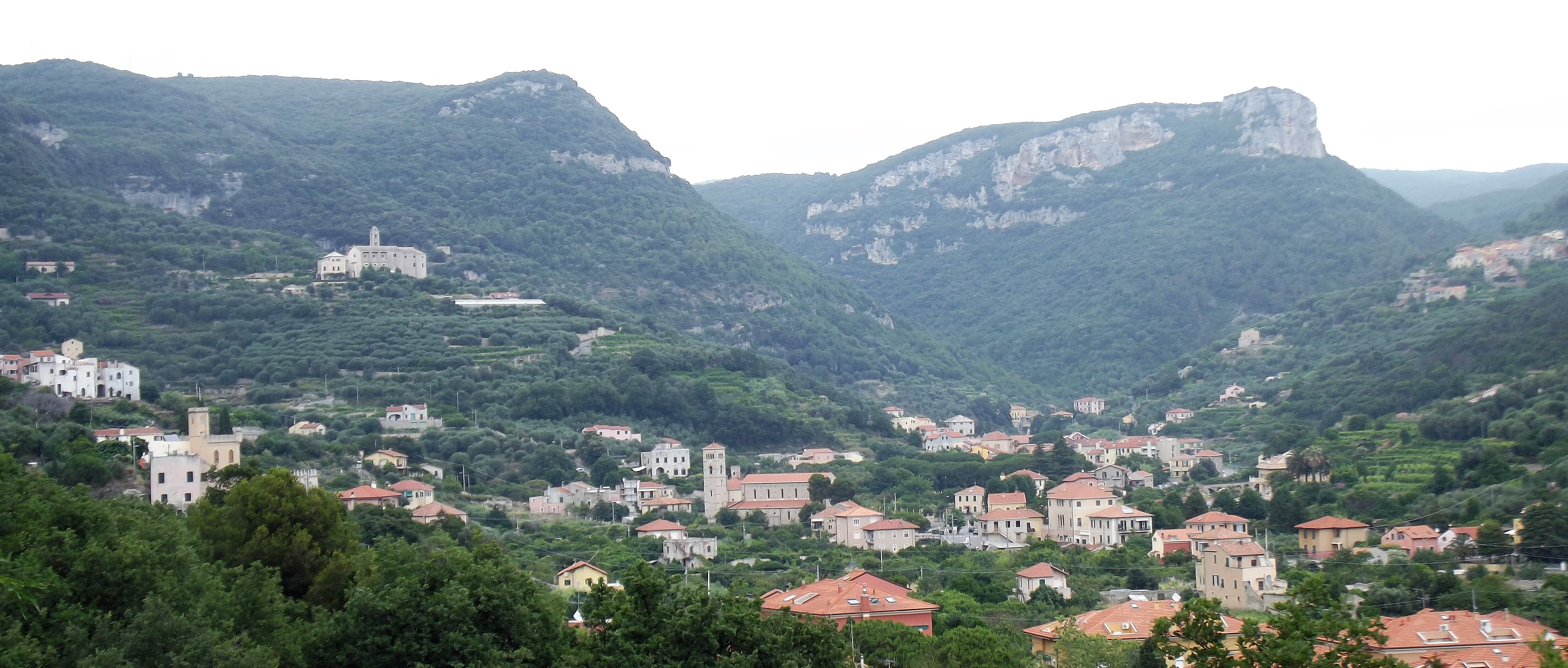
- Panoramic view

- Location of Calvisio in Italy
- Coordinates: 44°10′54.4″N 8°21′6.87″E
- Country: Italy
- Region: Liguria
- Province: Savona (SV)
- Comune: Finale Ligure
- Elevation: 21 m (69 ft)
- Time zone: UTC+1 (CET)
  - Summer (DST): UTC+2 (CEST)
- Postal code: 17024
- Dialing code: (+39) 019

Calvisio is a frazione (and parish) of the municipality of Finale Ligure, in Liguria, northern Italy.

== Geography ==
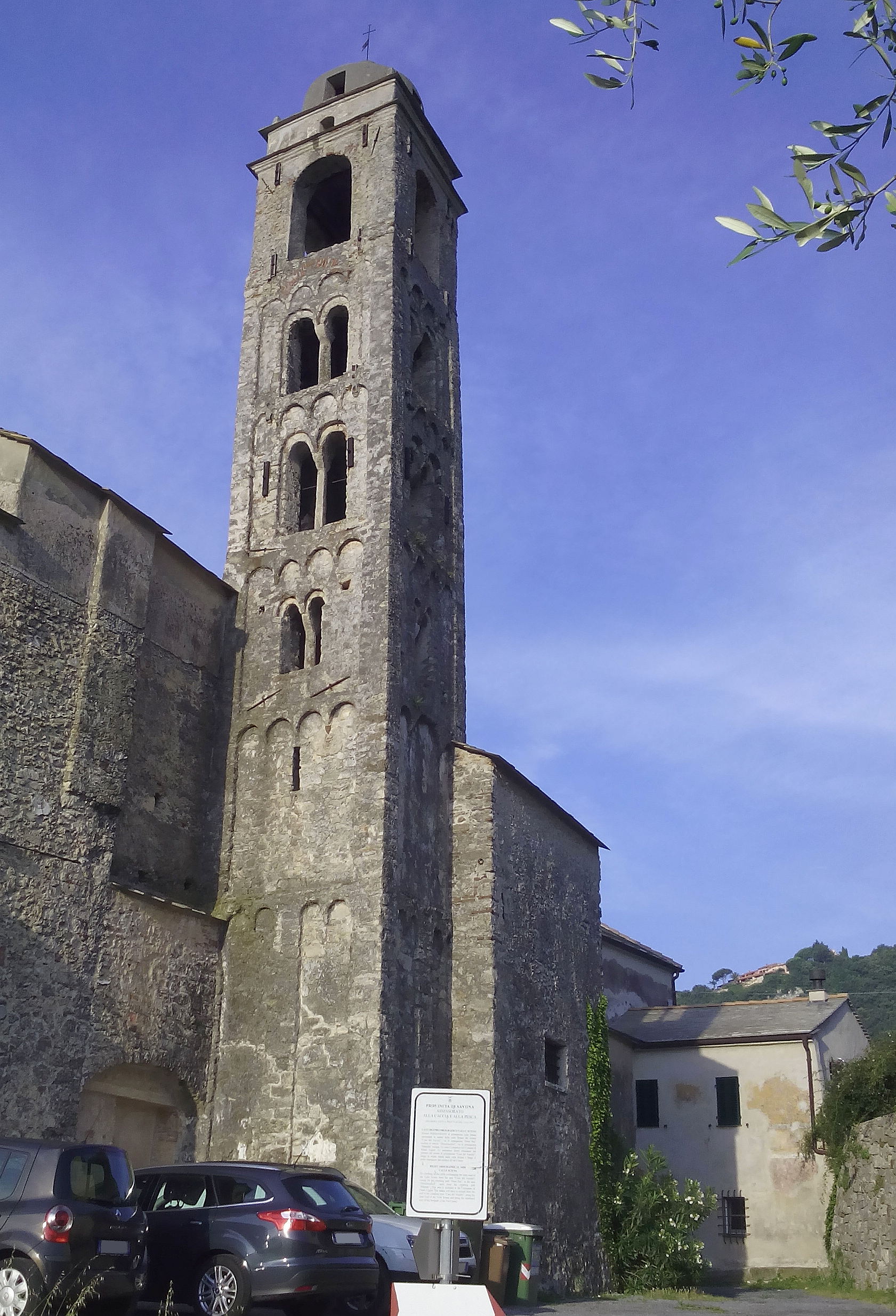
Lacrêma bell tower

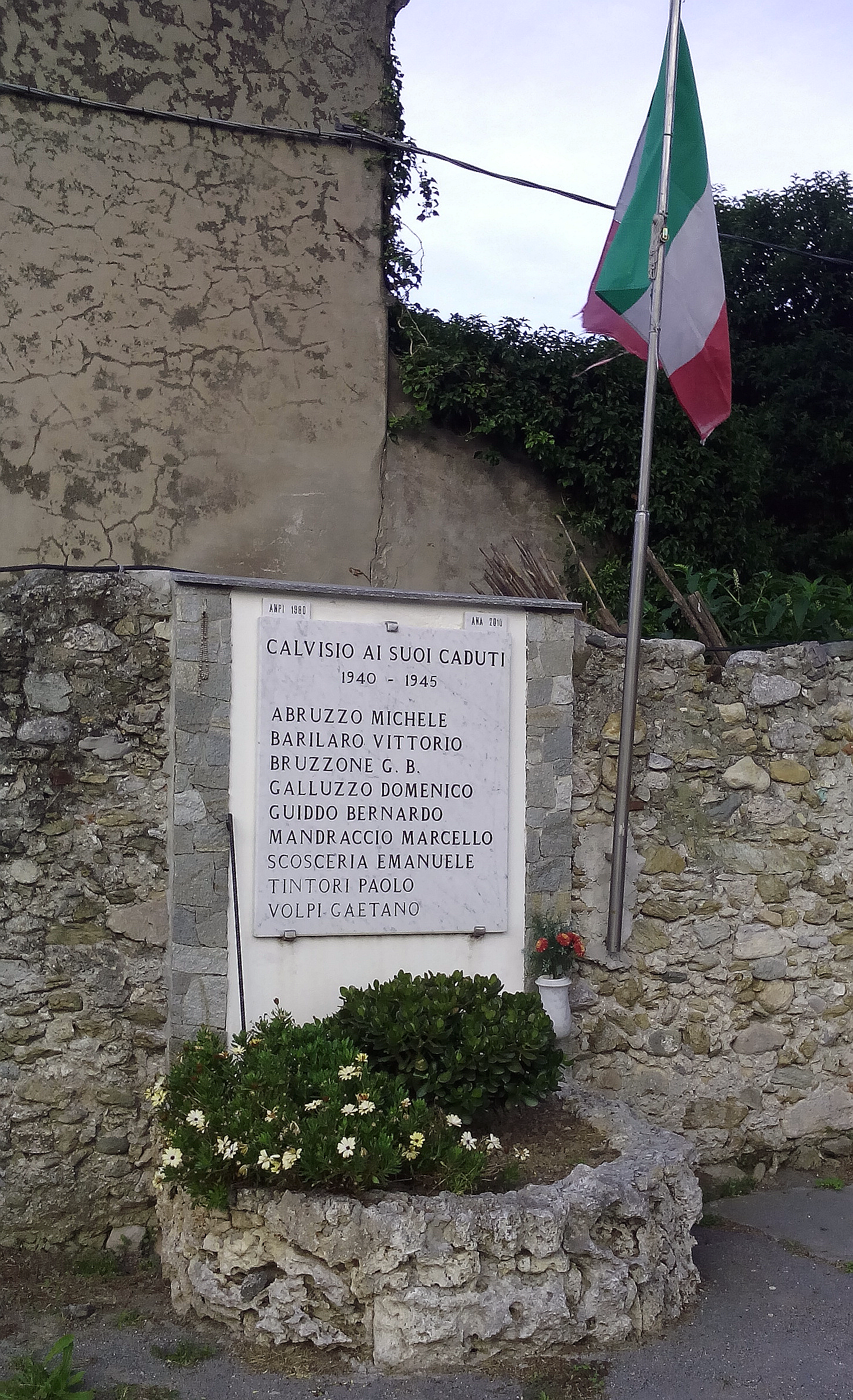
World War II memorial.

Present-day Calvisio is located near the Sciusa, mainly on the right banks of the stream. There also stands the parish church, built in a neo-Middle Ages style. On monte Tolla slopes, also on the right side of Sciusa Valley but at an elevation of 120 m, is located Lacrêma, the oldest part of the village, also known as Calvisio Vecchio (literally Old Calvisio).

== History ==
Calvisio area was inhabited by Ligures as confirmed by remains as an ellipse-shaped field encircled by menhirs named Pratorotondo (round meadow).

During the Roman Age the Sciusa Valley was crossed by Via Julia Augusta and maybe some of the stones of that ancient highway were recycled in oldest buildings of the village. Saint Cipriano church was promoted to parish church before 1356.

Calvisio was a separate comune (municipality) until 1868 when, with Varigotti (which also was an autonomous municipality) requested and obtained to be joined with Final Pia. At the time Calvisio had around 500 inhabitants.

It later followed the destiny of Final Pia, which in 1927 was joined to Finale Marina e Finalborgo giving the present-day municipality of Finale Ligure.

== Bibliography ==
- Virgilio, Jacopo (1869). Sulla aggregazione dei comuni di Calvisio, Finalpia e Varigotti ala Città di Finalmarina: osservazioni. Genova: Tip.del commercio.

Media related to Calvisio at Wikimedia Commons
