= Gorra =

Gorra is a surname. Notable people with the surname include:

- Giulio Gorra (1832–1884), Italian painter
- Guy Maganga Gorra (born 1993), Gabonese sprinter
- Michael Gorra (born 1957), American professor of English and literature
- Patrick Gorra (born 1955), Belgium
