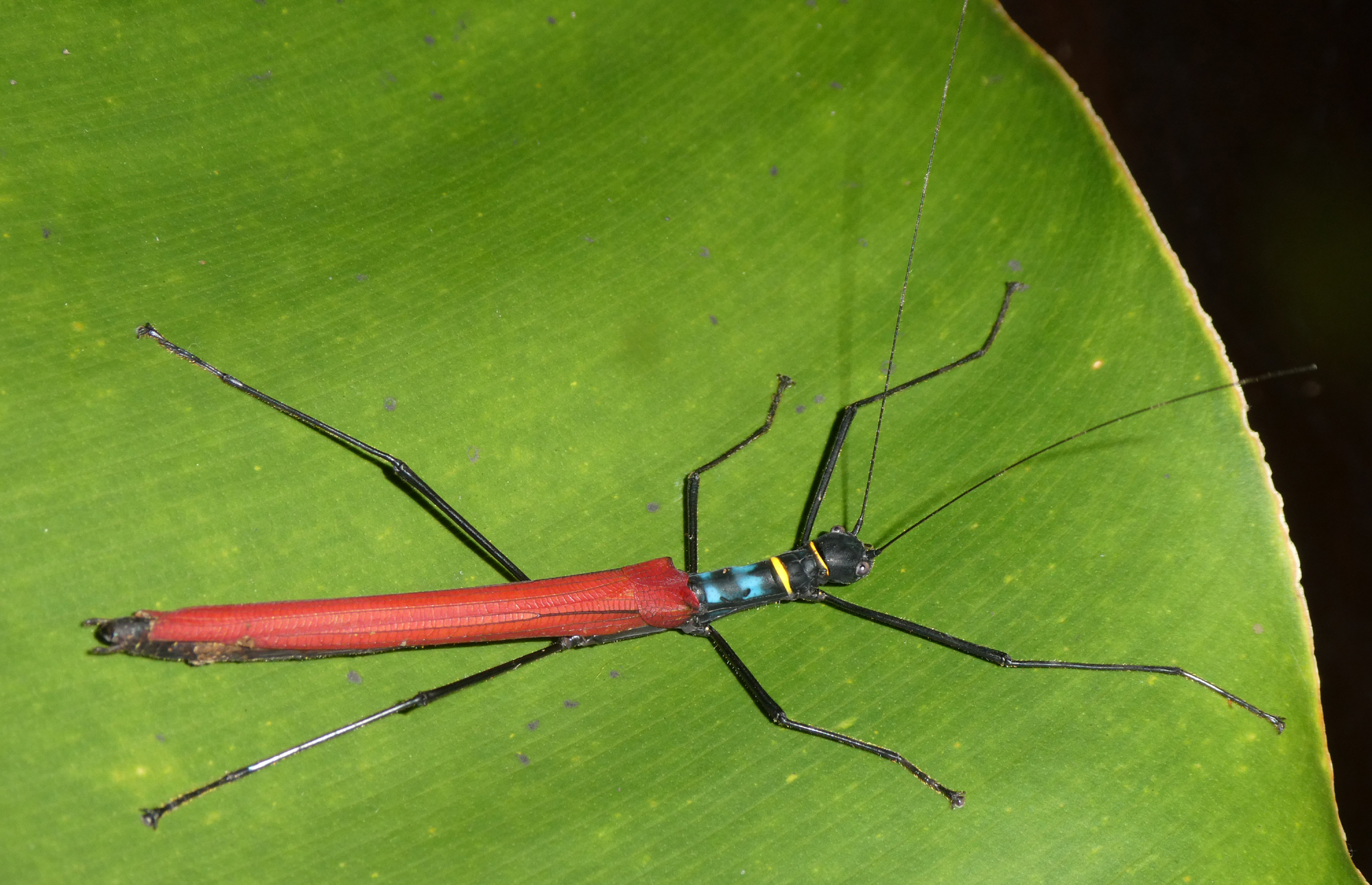
- Calvisia kneubuehleri

Scientific classification
- Kingdom: Animalia
- Phylum: Arthropoda
- Clade: Pancrustacea
- Class: Insecta
- Order: Phasmatodea
- Family: Lonchodidae
- Subfamily: Necrosciinae
- Genus: Calvisia; Stål, 1875

= Calvisia (insect) =

Genus of stick insects

Calvisia is a genus of stick insects in the subfamily Necrosciinae (tribe Necrosciini). Species are known to be distributed in temperate and tropical Asia.

== Species ==
The Phasmida Species File lists:

=== Subgenus Calvisia Stål, 1875 ===
1. Calvisia acutegranulosa (Redtenbacher, 1908)
2. Calvisia conicipennis (Bates, 1865)
3. Calvisia costata (Thunberg, 1815)
4. Calvisia fessa Redtenbacher, 1908
5. Calvisia khlongsokana Bresseel, Constant, Jiaranaisakul & Hübner, 2022
6. Calvisia kneubuehleri Bresseel & Constant, 2017
7. Calvisia lineata Redtenbacher, 1908
8. Calvisia medogensis Bi, 1993
9. Calvisia sammannani Seow-Choen, 2016
10. Calvisia sangarius (Westwood, 1859) - type species (as Necroscia sangarius Westwood)
11. Calvisia torquata (Bates, 1865)

=== Subgenus Conocalvisia Seow-Choen, 2016 ===
1. Calvisia aeruginosa Redtenbacher, 1908
2. Calvisia coerulescens Redtenbacher, 1908
3. Calvisia fuscoalata Redtenbacher, 1908
4. Calvisia hemus (Westwood, 1859)
5. Calvisia hilaris (Westwood, 1848)
6. Calvisia hippolyte (Westwood, 1859)
7. Calvisia leopoldi Werner, 1934
8. Calvisia octolineata Redtenbacher, 1908
9. Calvisia semihilaris Redtenbacher, 1908
10. Calvisia spurcata Redtenbacher, 1908
11. Calvisia virbius (Westwood, 1859)

=== Subgenus Nigracalvisia Seow-Choen, 2016 ===
1. Calvisia abercrombiei Seow-Choen, 2016
2. Calvisia albosignata Redtenbacher, 1908
3. Calvisia ferruginea Redtenbacher, 1908
4. Calvisia flavopennis Seow-Choen, 2016
5. Calvisia fordae Seow-Choen, 2016
6. Calvisia fuscoviridis Seow-Choen, 2016
7. Calvisia grossegranosa Redtenbacher, 1908
8. Calvisia harmani Seow-Choen, 2019
9. Calvisia nigroaxillaris Günther, 1943
10. Calvisia omissa Redtenbacher, 1908
11. Calvisia rufescens Redtenbacher, 1908

=== Subgenus Punctatocalvisia Seow-Choen, 2016 ===
1. Calvisia conspersa Redtenbacher, 1908
2. Calvisia hennemanni Seow-Choen, 2016
3. Calvisia pseudoscutellum Seow-Choen, 2016

=== Subgenus Spinocalvisia Seow-Choen, 2016 ===
1. Calvisia medora (Westwood, 1859)
2. Calvisia medorina Redtenbacher, 1908

=== Subgenus Viridocalvisia Seow-Choen, 2016 ===
1. Calvisia aspersa (Redtenbacher, 1908)
2. Calvisia bakeri Seow-Choen, 2017
3. Calvisia biguttata (Burmeister, 1838)
4. Calvisia chani Seow-Choen, 2016
5. Calvisia clarissima Redtenbacher, 1908
6. Calvisia flavoguttata Redtenbacher, 1908
7. Calvisia marmorata (Redtenbacher, 1908)
8. Calvisia punctulata Redtenbacher, 1908

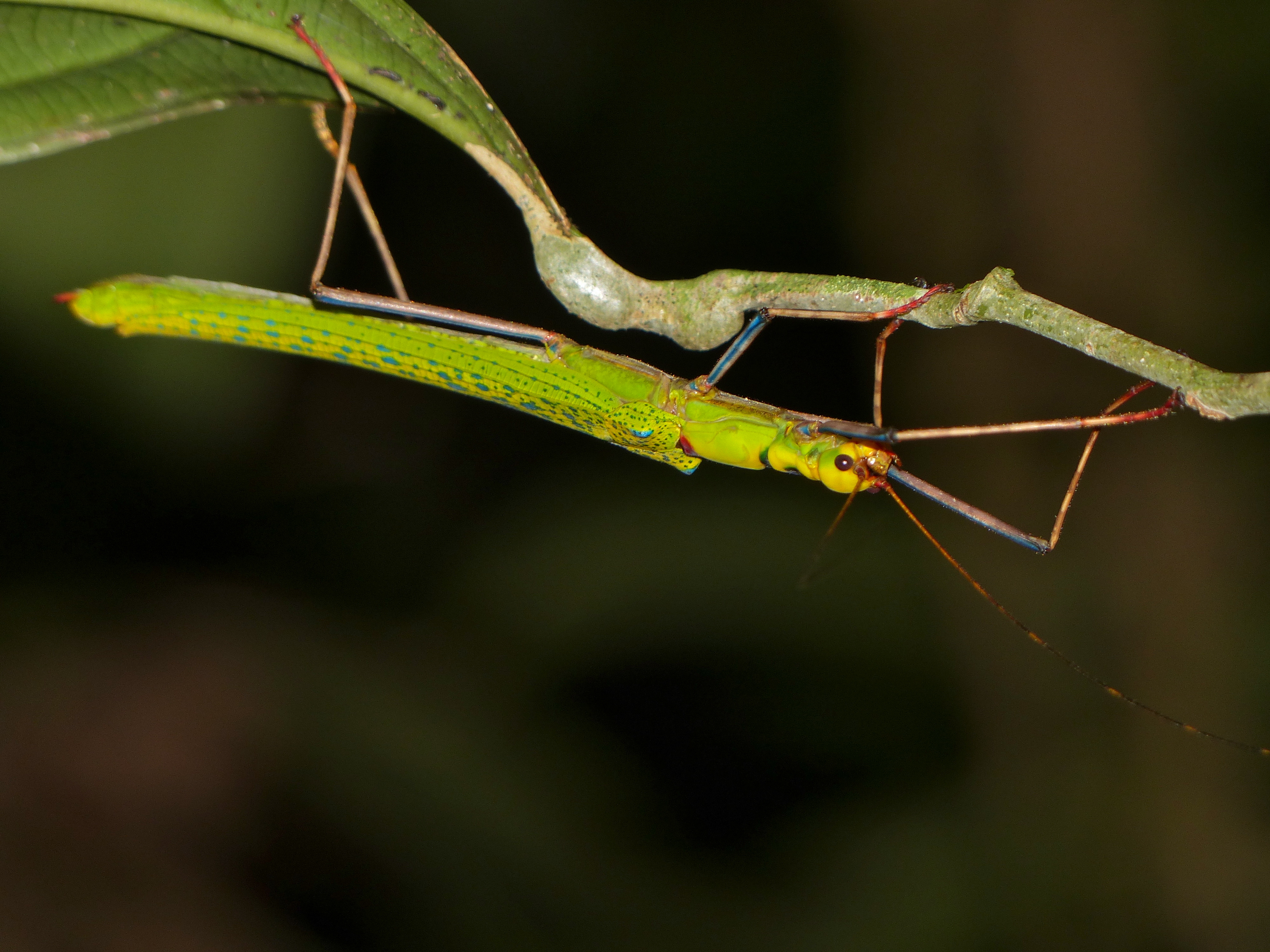
Calvisia punctulata female
