= Varigotti =

- Frazione
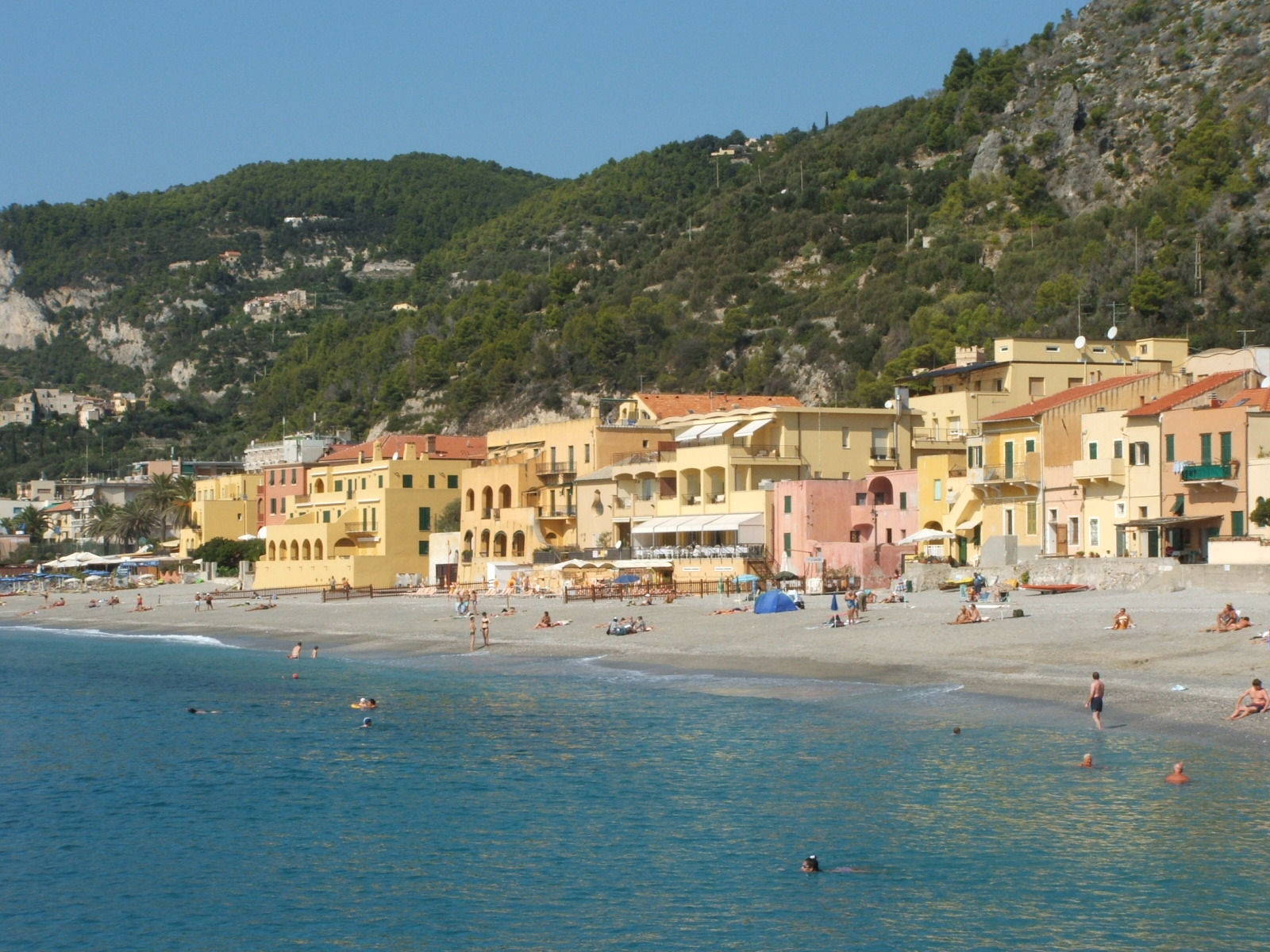
- Panorama
- Interactive map of Varigotti
- Coordinates: 44°10′17″N 8°20′40″E
- Country: Italy
- Region: Liguria
- Province: Savona
- Comune: Finale Ligure
- Elevation: 0 m (0 ft)

Population (2009)
  - Total: 743
- Demonym: Varigottesi
- Time zone: UTC+1 (CET)
  - Summer (DST): UTC+2 (CEST)
- Postal code: 17024
- Area code: 019
- Website: Official website
- saint of the village: St. Lawrence (August 10)

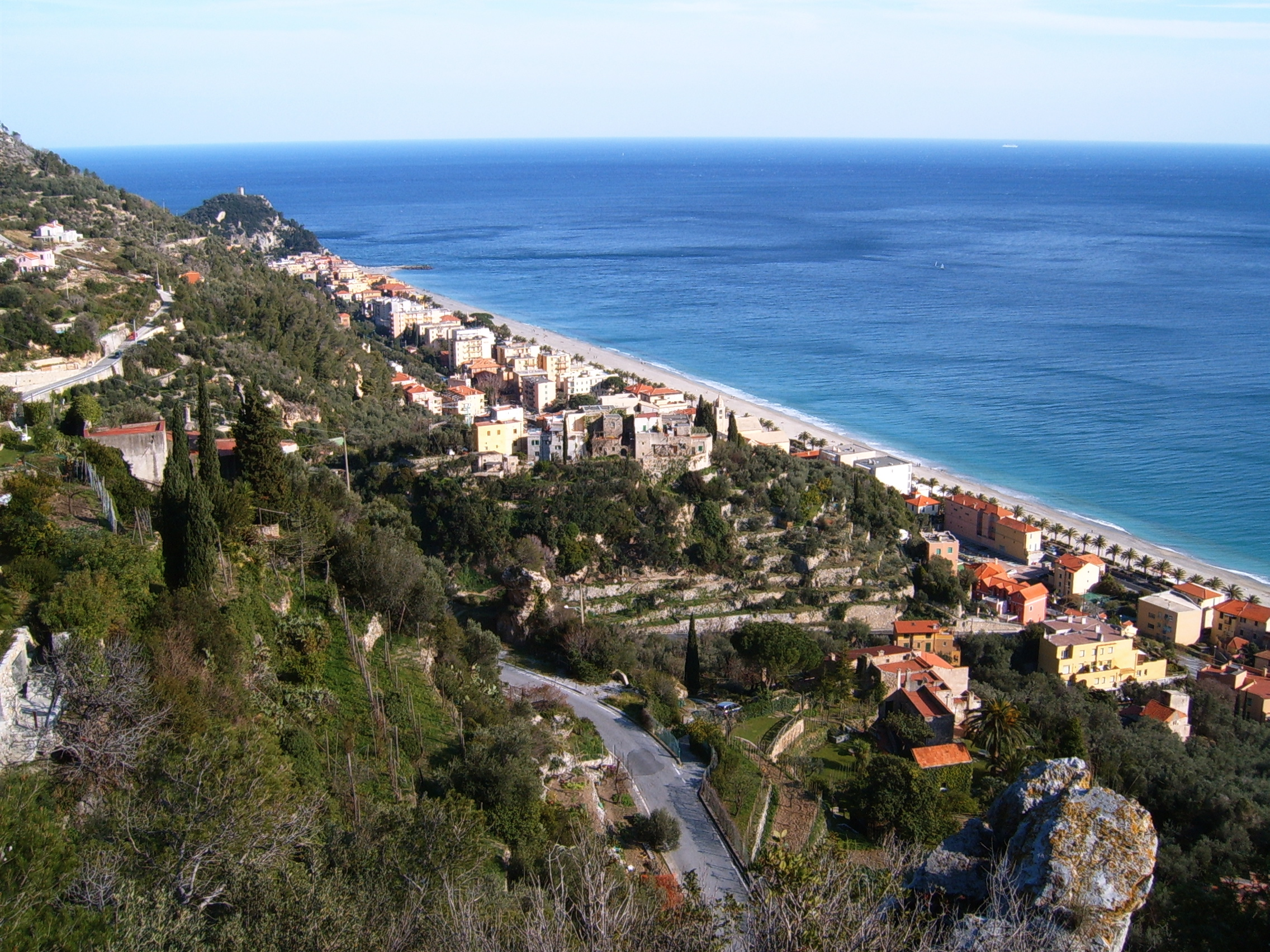
Varigotti.

Varigotti is a frazione (locality) of the comune of Finale Ligure, in Liguria, northern Italy.

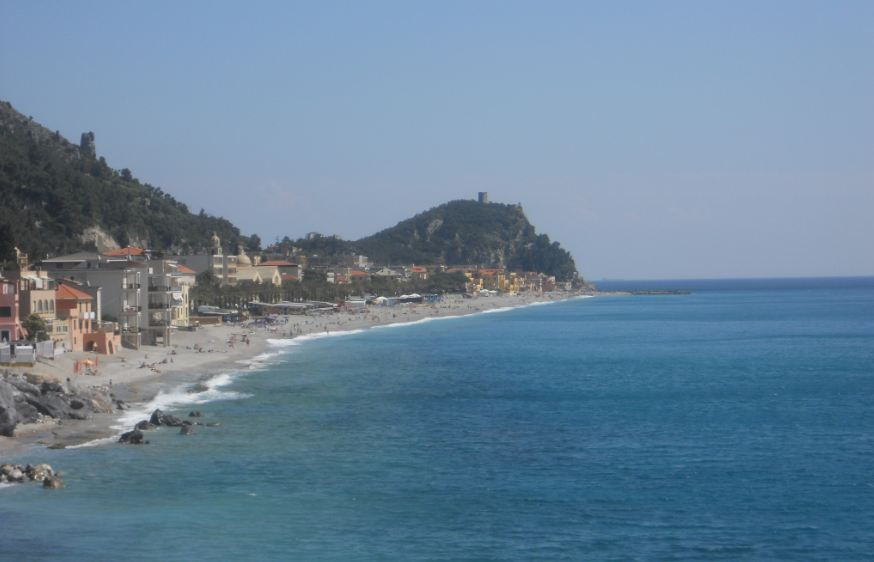
Panorama di Varigotti

== History ==
In late antiquity times, it was known as Varicottis. In 643, when it was home to a Byzantine fortification, it was destroyed by the Lombard king Rothari. Later it suffered from Saracen raids, and in the 12th century it was contended between the marquisses of Noli and the Del Carretto family. Later it was a possession of the Republic of Genoa, and became an autonomous commune after the French Revolution.

In 1869, during the construction of the Genoa-Ventimiglia railroad, it was annexed to the Final Pia commune, and was subsequently part of the comune of Finale Ligure.

== Tourism ==
Varigotti is a popular tourist destination, with both seaside and natural attractions. Most tourists come in the summer, since Varigotti is famous for its sea and beaches, particularly the Saracen's Beach, which is one of the largest public beaches in liguria.

== Gallery ==
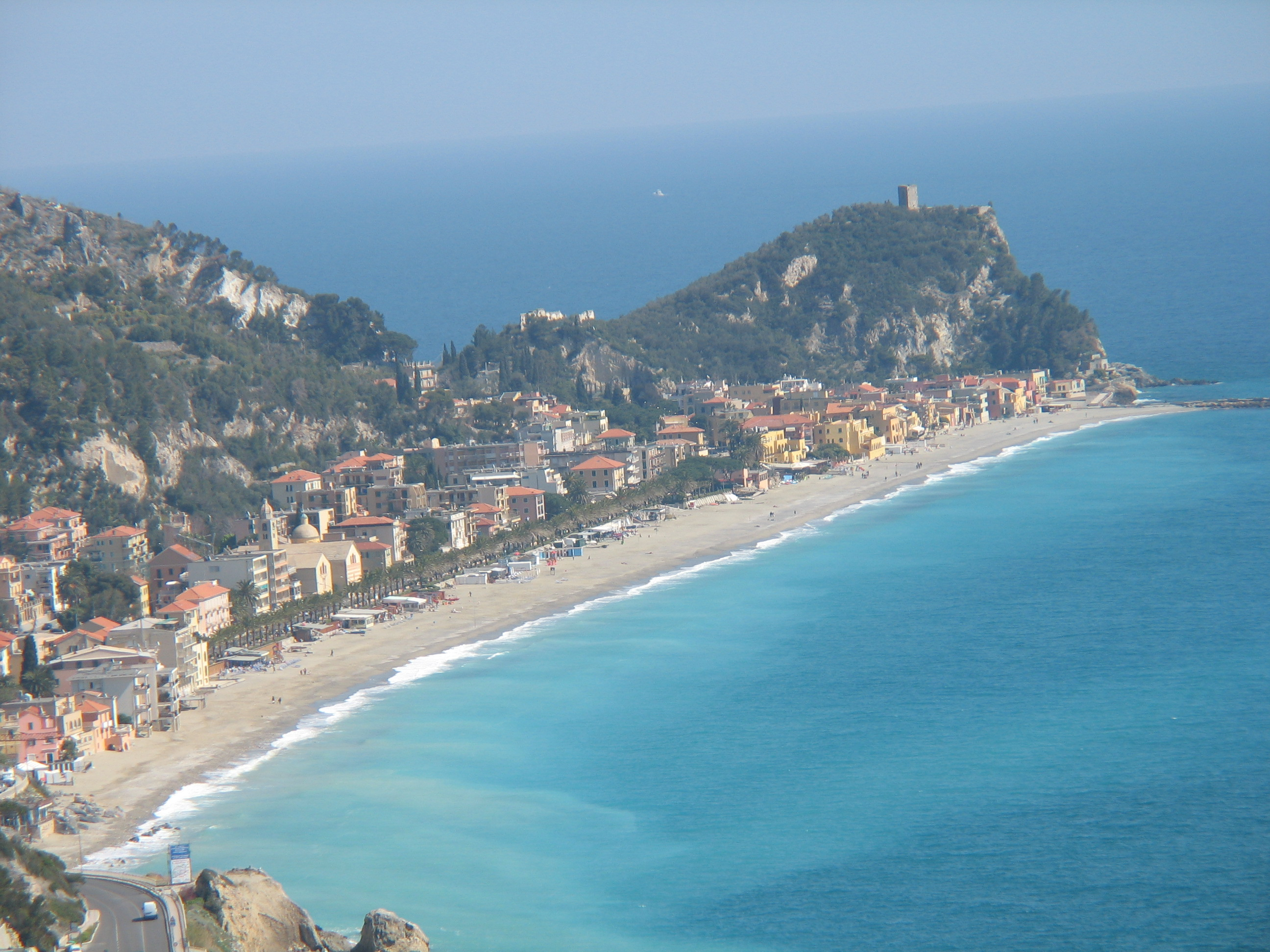

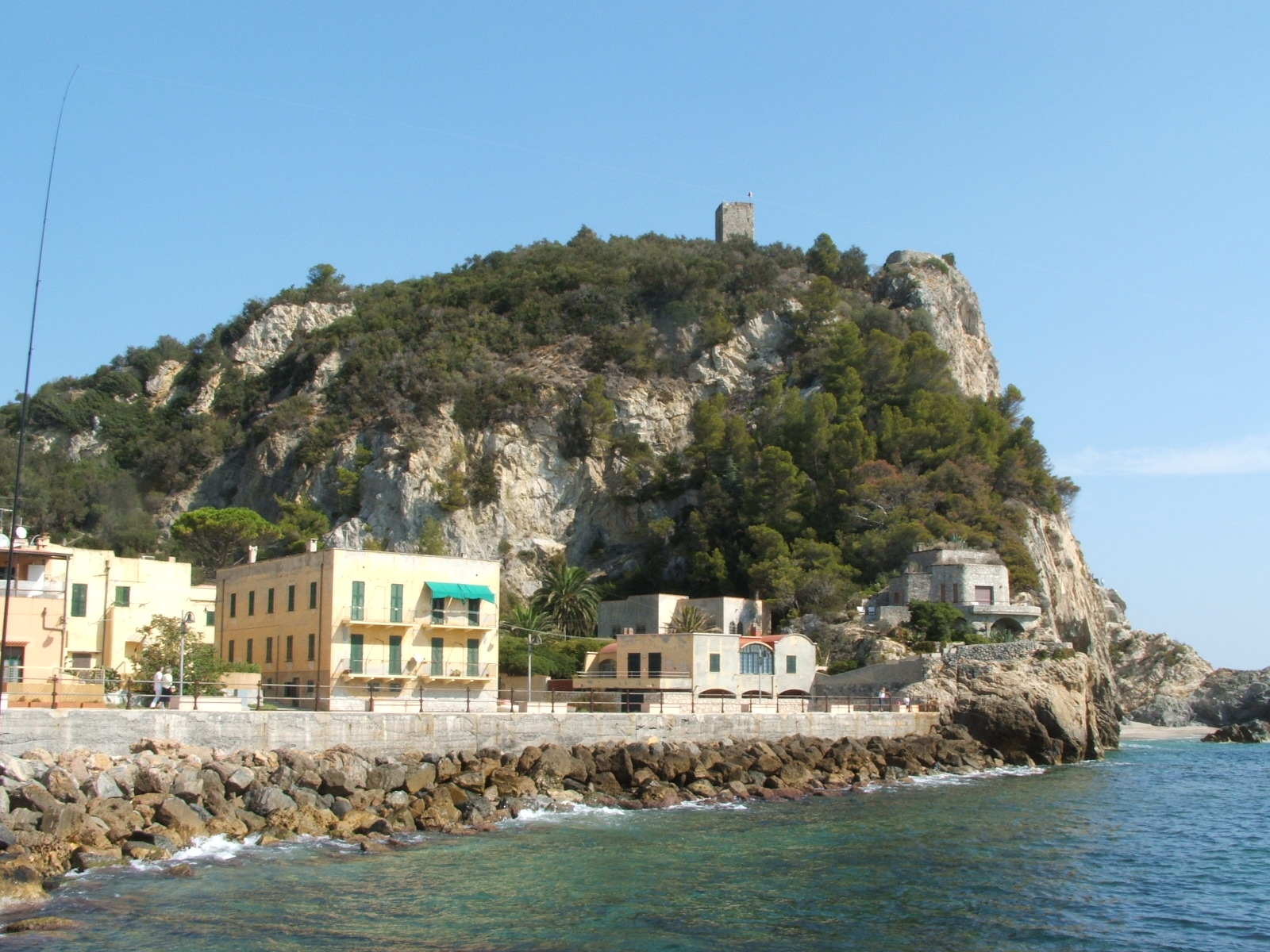

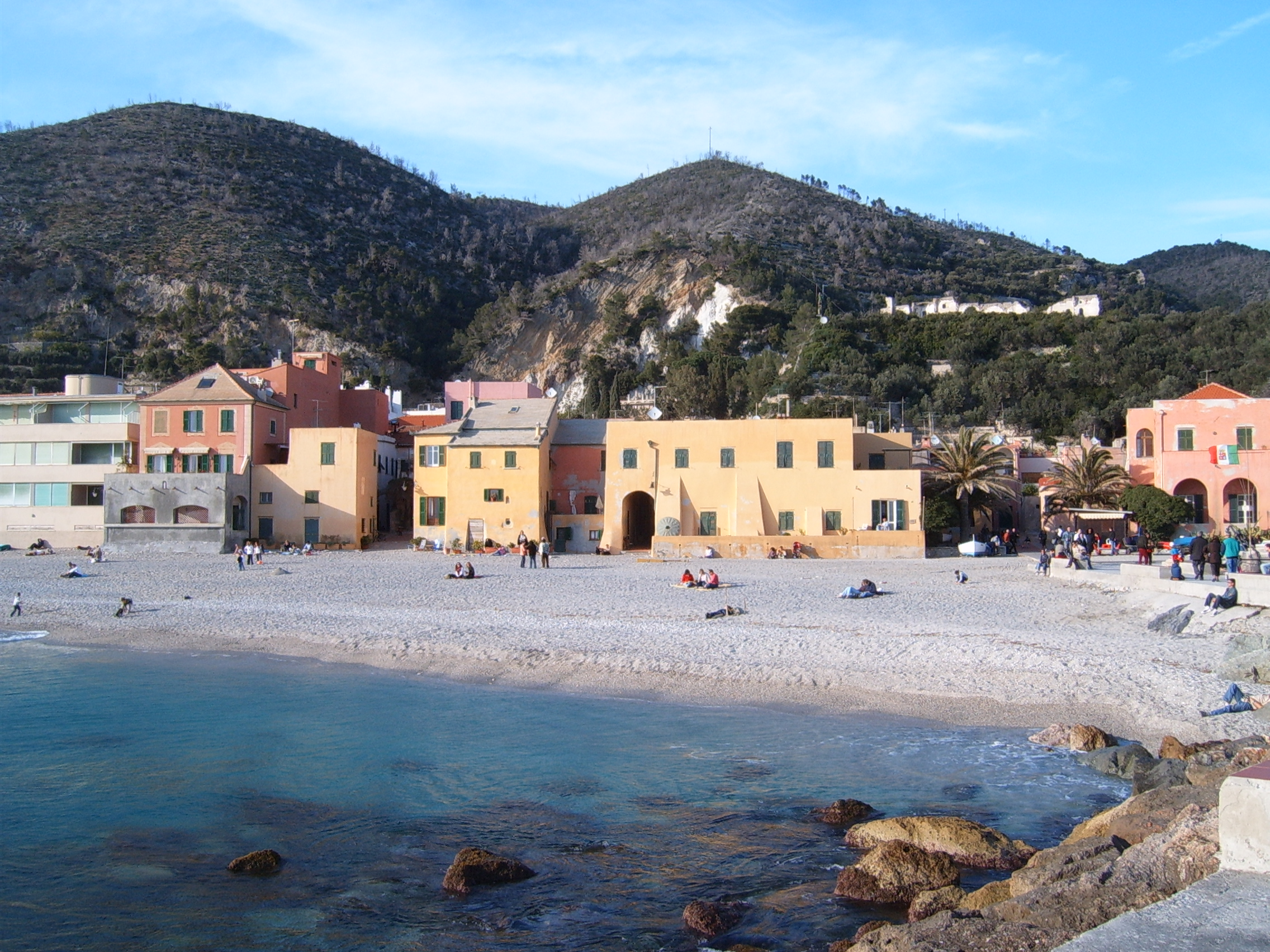

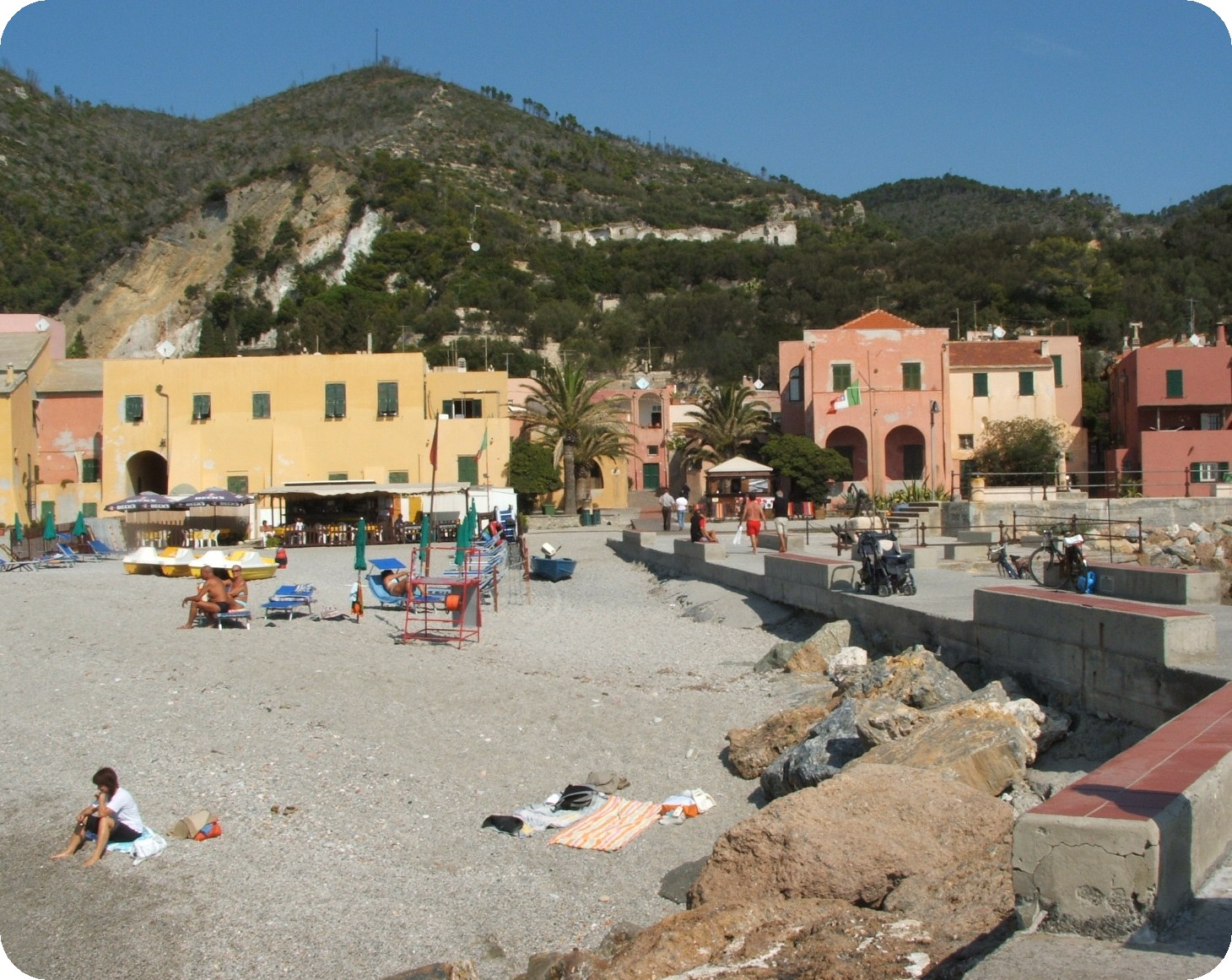

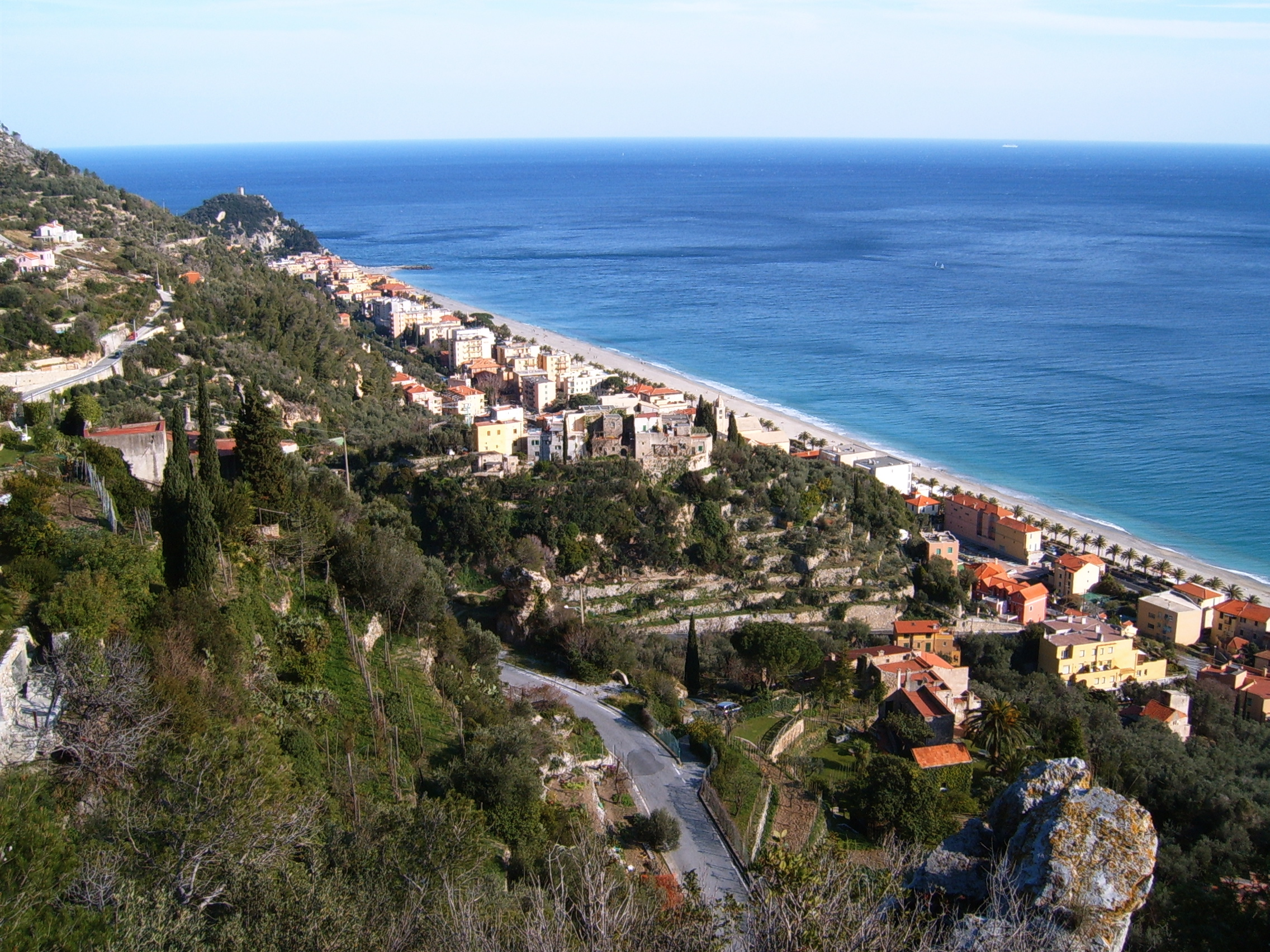

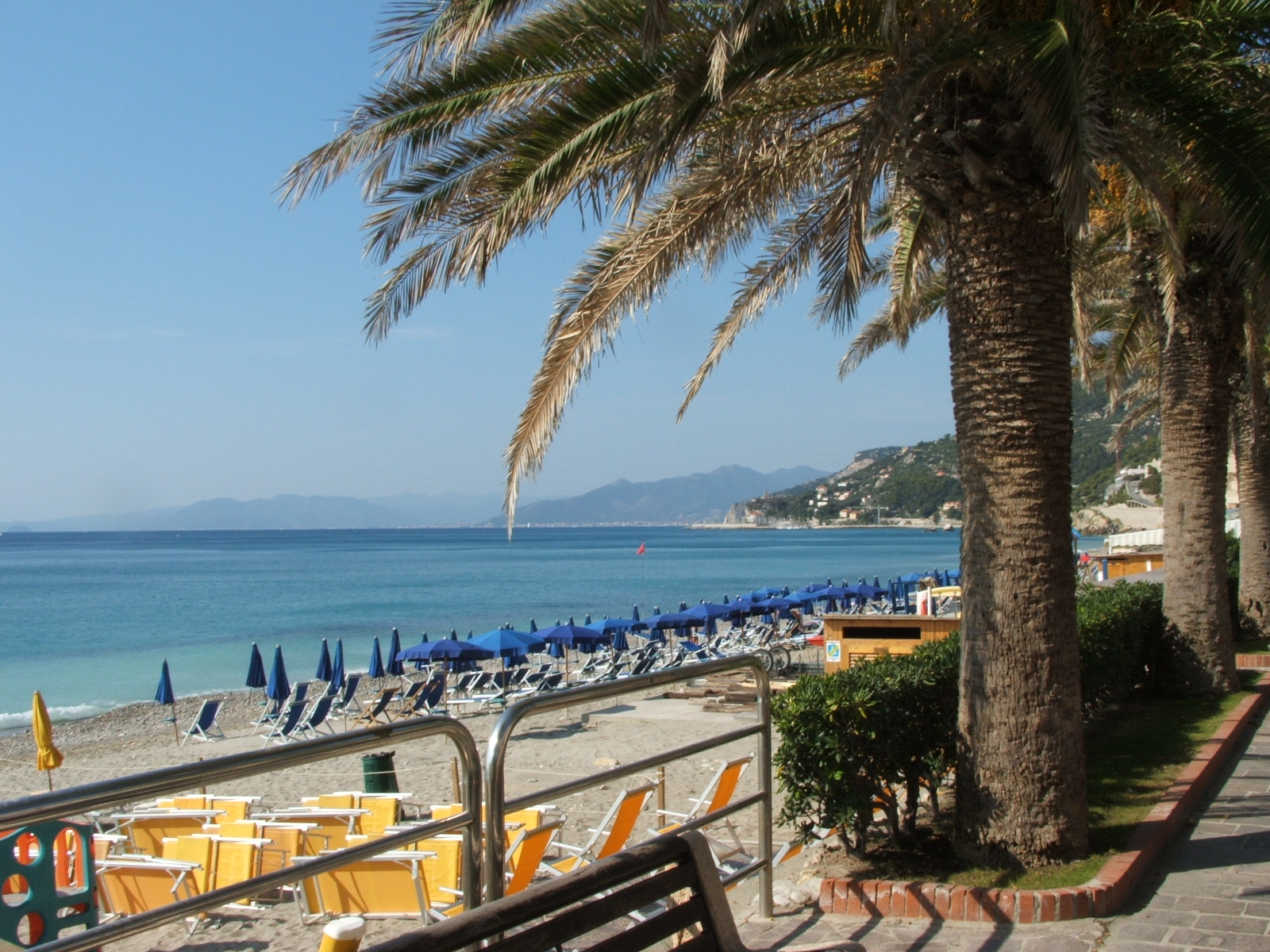
