= Margaret Kerdeston =

- Born: after 1425
- Died: after 5 December 1485
- Noble family: Foix
- Spouse: John de Foix, 1st Earl of Kendal
- Father: Sir Thomas Kerdeston (d. 1446)
- Mother: Lady Elizabeth de la Pole

Margaret Kerdeston (after 1425 – after 5 December 1485), Countess of Kendal (Candale), was the paternal grandmother of Anne of Foix-Candale, queen of Hungary and Bohemia.

== Life ==
She was the daughter of Sir Thomas Kerdeston (d. 1446) and Elizabeth de la Pole. Her mother was a daughter of Michael de la Pole, 2nd Earl of Suffolk and sister of William de la Pole, 1st Duke of Suffolk. She married John de Foix, 1st Earl of Kendal, and gave birth to four children, including Gaston de Foix, Count of Candale.

She is buried at the church of Castelnau-de-Médoc with her husband.

== Children ==
- From her husband, John de Foix, 1st Earl of Kendal:
  - Gaston de Foix, Count of Candale (ca. 1448-1500), whose 1st wife was Infanta Catherine of Navarre (ca. 1455 – before 1494); their issue included Anne of Foix-Candale queen of Hungary; Gaston's 2nd wife was Isabel of Albret, the daughter of Alain I of Albret (d. ca. 1530), with whom be fathered other children.
  - John (d. 1521) viscount of Meille in Aragon, count of Fleix and Gurson, his wife Anne de Villeneuve (d. 1567): issue, the dukes of Randan.
  - Catherine (d. 1510), her husband Charles I, Count of Armagnac (1425–1497): without issue
  - Margaret (d. 1534/36), her husband, Ludovico II, Marquess of Saluzzo (1438–1504): issue.

== Bibliography ==
- Kropf, Lajos: Anna királyné, II. Ulászló neje (Queen Anne of Foix-Candale, the Consort of Ladislas II). Századok (Periodical Centuries) 29. 689-709. 1895.
- Richardson, Douglas, Magna Carty Ancestry: A Study in colonial and Medieval Families, 2nd Edition 2011, vol. 2, pp. 43f. - ISBN 978-1-4610-4520-5
