= Gian Gabriele I of Saluzzo =

Last Marquis of Saluzzo (1501–1548)

Gian Gabriele I (1501–1548) was the last Marquis of Saluzzo, Italy. He ruled the marquisate from 1537 to his deposition in 1548. The marquisate of Saluzzo was annexed to France the following year.

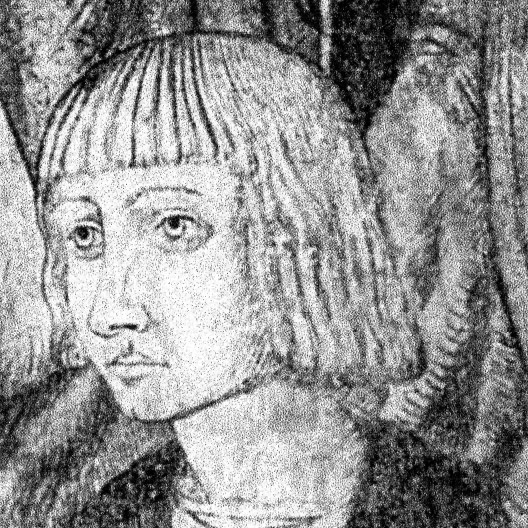
Gian Gabriele Marquis of Saluzzo.

== Life ==
Gian Gabriele was born 26 September 1501 in Saluzzo and died 29 July 1548 in Pinerolo.

Gabriele was the fourth and youngest son of Ludovico II of Saluzzo and Margaret of Foix-Candale. Because it was unlikely that he would rule Saluzzo, he embarked on a career in the church, becoming abbot of Staffarda Abbey. But when two of his brothers had died and with Giovanni Ludovico in exile, he was recalled to rule the marquisate of Saluzzo in 1537.

This couldn't have been at a worse time. The marquisate had been a battleground during the Italian Wars and a succession war between the pro-Habsburg Giovanni Ludovico and the pro-French Francesco. This left the marquisate utterly ruined and completely dependent on the King of France.

Gabriele couldn't turn the tide and he was deposed by an uprising on 23 February 1548. Representatives of the Saluzzo municipalities gathered to discuss the future of the nation and decided to request the annexation to France.

In 1549, King Henry II of France formally annexed Saluzzo to France. By then, Gabriele had already died.

Preceded by Francesco	Marquis of Saluzzo; 1537–1548	Succeeded by (French rule)
