= John of Foix =

John of Foix or Jean de Foix may refer to:

- John I, Count of Foix (died 1436)
- John de Foix, 1st Earl of Kendal (died 1485)
- John of Foix, Viscount of Narbonne (died 1500)
- John III of Navarre (died 1516), was also Count John II of Foix
