= John de Foix, 1st Earl of Kendal =

15th-century French nobleman

Jean de Foix
- 1st Earl of Kendal (third creation)
- Tenure: 1446–1485
- Successor: Gaston II de Foix, 2me comte de Candalle
- Other titles: Comte de Benauges, Vicomte de Castillon
- Born: c. 1415
- Died: 1485; Castelnau-de-Médoc
- Spouse(s): Margaret Kerdeston
- Parents: Gaston I de Foix; Margaret of Albret

Jean de Foix (c. 1415 – 1485) was the Captal de Buch, first Earl of Kendal (Gallicised into "Comte de Candalle"), Vicomte de Castillon, Meilles and Comte de Benauges.

== Biography ==
Jean de Foix was a Gascon noble in the service of the English. His parents were Gaston de Foix, captal de Buch (1412–1456), and Marguerite d'Albret, daughter of Arnaud Amanieu, Lord of Albret, and Marguerite de Bourbon (1344–1416).

In 1445, like his father before him, John became a Knight in the Order of the Garter. He was active in the defence and subsequent recovery of the city of Bordeaux. Then on 17 July 1453 he and John Talbot, 1st Earl of Shrewsbury, fought the French forces at the Battle of Castillon. Talbot and a son were killed and Jean de Foix was taken prisoner. The French King Charles VII sent John de Foix to Taillebourg Castle where he was held prisoner by Olivier de Coëtivy, Seneschal of Guyenne. John negotiated his ransom directly with Olivier de Coëtivy and was released, after seven years on 18 January 1460, after promising to pay 23,850 écus. On his release he left France for England where he was captured in the Tower of London following the Battle of Northampton on 10 July 1460. He was placed in the custody of Richard Neville, Earl of Warwick, and returned with him to France.

When King Charles VII died in July 1461, John de Foix still owed Olivier de Coëtivy 18,000 écus, but the new King Louis XI of France, who profoundly hated everybody who had served his father, forced Olivier de Coëtivy to cancel this debt. Jean de Foix now entered in the service of King Louis XI. He may have resigned the Order of the Garter in 1462, but the family continued to use the title 'Earl of Kendal' until the death of Henri François de Foix-Candalle (1640–1714), duc de Randan.

== Family ==
Jean de Foix was married in 1446 to Margaret Kerdeston, daughter of Sir Thomas Kerdeston and Elizabeth de la Pole. (Elizabeth was sister to William de la Pole, 1st Duke of Suffolk. They had:

- Gaston de Foix, Comte de Candale, married (1)1469 his cousin Catherine de Foix (2)1494 Isabelle d'Albret
- Jean de Foix (d. 1521) Comte de Gurcon, de Fleix, de Meilles, Married (1507) Anne de Villeneuve (d. 1567)
- Catherine de Foix (d. 1510), married 1468 Charles, Comte d'Armagnac
- Marguerite de Foix (d. 1534/36), married 1492 Ludovico II, Marquess of Saluzzo (1438–1504)
