= Gaston, Count of Candale =

French noble

Gaston of Foix
- Born: 1448
- Died: 25 March 1500 (aged 51–52)
- Noble family: Foix
- Spouse: Catherine of Foix
- Father: John de Foix, 1st Earl of Kendal
- Mother: Margaret Kerdeston

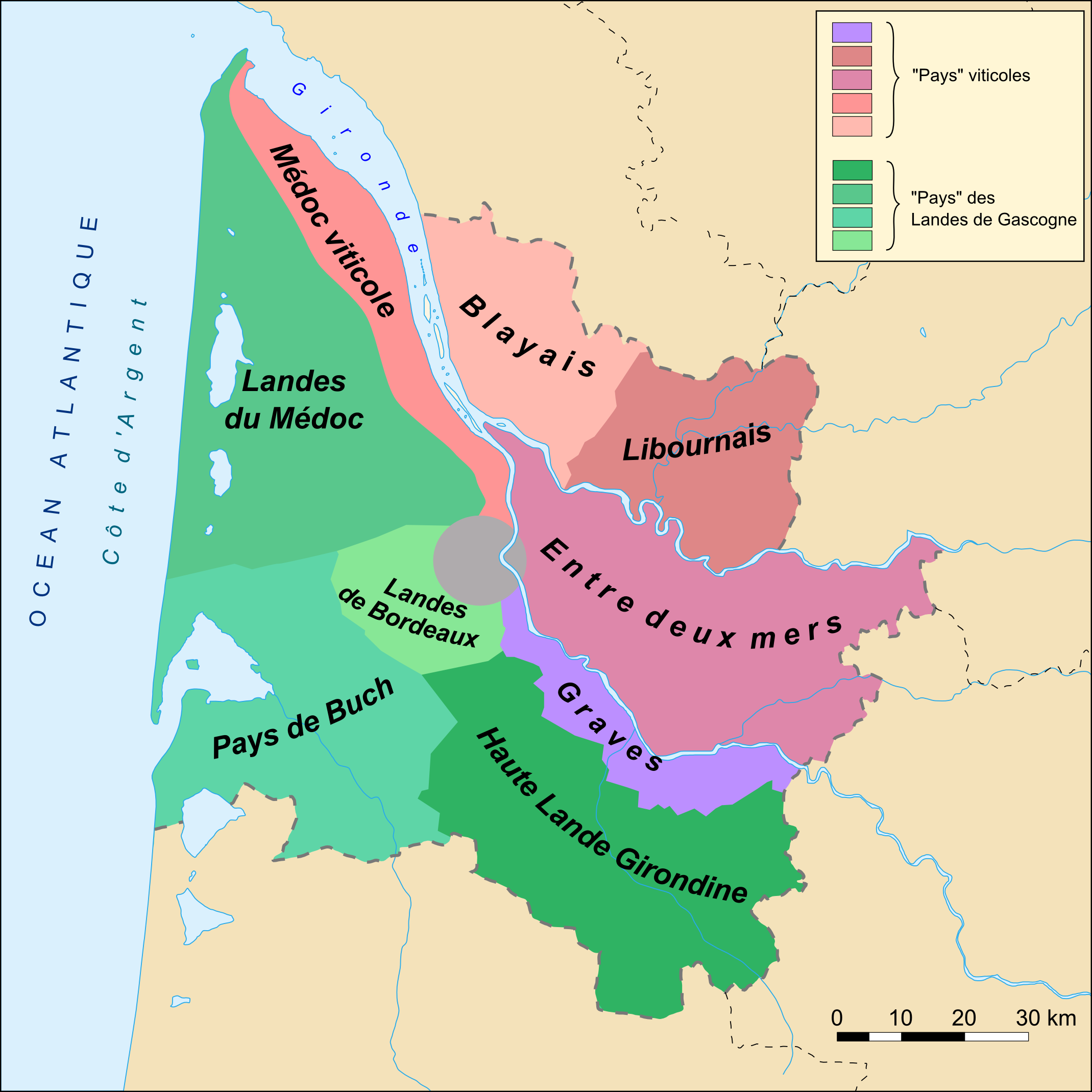

Gaston of Foix (1448 – 25 March 1500), Earl of Kendal and Count of Benauges, was a French nobleman in the last decades of the Middle Ages. He was a cadet member of the important Foix family in Southern France. He was the son of John de Foix, 1st Earl of Kendal, and Margaret Kerdeston.

Gaston succeeded as the Count of Benauges in France. As heir of John de Foix, Earl of Kendal, he also continued to claim that English peerage and therefore was styled Comte de Candale.

== Marriages and issue ==
He firstly married Infanta Catherine of Navarre, the youngest daughter of Gaston IV, Count of Foix, and Eleanor of Navarre. They had four children:

- Gaston de Foix, 3rd Count of Candale. Died 1536
- Jean de Foix, Archbishop of Bordeaux.
- Pierre de Foix, died without issue.
- Anne of Foix, married King Vladislaus II of Hungary.

In 1494, he remarried with Isabelle of Albret, daughter of Alain I of Albret. They had four children:

- Alain de Foix, married Françoise dite de Montpezat des Prez.
- Louise de Foix (died 1534), married François de Melun, Count of Epinoy and Knight in the Order of the Golden Fleece.
- Amanieu de Foix (died 1541), Bishop of Carcassonne and Mâcon.
- Marguerite de Foix.

He also had three illegitimate children.

== Sources ==
- Boureau, Alain (1995). The Lord's First Night: The Myth of the Droit de Cuissage. Translated by Cochrane, Lydia G. The University of Chicago Press.
- Cazacu, Matei (2017). Reinert, Stephen W. (ed.). Dracula. Brill.
- Previté-Orton, C. W. (1962). The Shorter Cambridge Medieval History. Vol. II. Cambridge at the University Press.
- Sluga, Glenda; James, Carolyn, eds. (2016). Women, Diplomacy and International Politics since 1500. Routledge.
