= Michele Antonio of Saluzzo =

Marquess of Saluzzo from 1504 until 1528

Michele Antonio del Vasto
- Marquess of Saluzzo
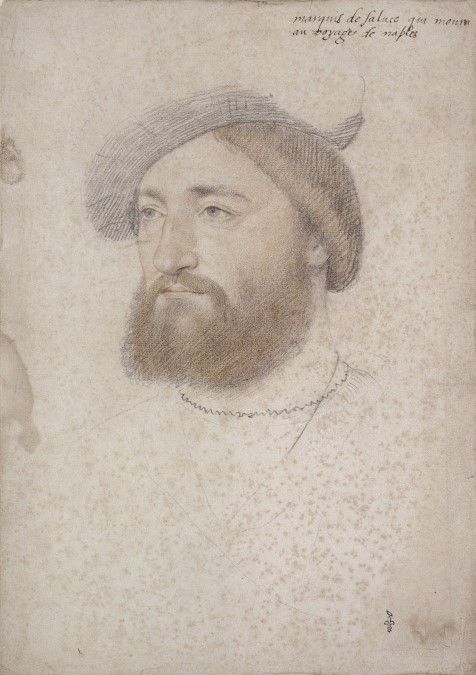
- Portrait by Jean Clouet, c. 1525
- Born: 26 March 1495; Saluzzo
- Died: 18 October 1528 (aged 33); Aversa
- Buried: Santa Maria in Aracoeli, Rome
- Noble family: House of Aleramici
- Father: Ludovico II, Marquess of Saluzzo
- Mother: Margaret of Foix-Candale

Michele Antonio del Vasto (26 March 1495 – 18 October 1528) was the Marquess of Saluzzo from 1504 until his death.

Born in Saluzzo, the elder son of Ludovico II of Saluzzo and Margaret of Foix-Candale, he was Count of Carmagnola until he succeeded to his father. He took part, initially alongside Ludovico, in the Italian Wars of Louis XII and Francis I of France. In particular, he distinguished himself at the Battle of Pavia (1525).

Michele Antonio died from wounds sustained by a cannonball at the Battle of Aversa. (Note: Gregorovius simply states Saluzzo died of wounds.) According to his last will, he was buried in the church of Santa Maria in Aracoeli in Rome, while his heart was kept in Piedmont.

== See also ==
- Italian War of 1521-1526

== Sources ==
- Rapple, Rory (2009). Martial Power and Elizabethan Political Culture: Military Men in England and Ireland, 1558-1594. Cambridge University Press.
- Tavuzzi, Michael (2007). Renaissance Inquisitors: Dominican Inquisitors and Inquisitorial Districts in Northern Italy, 1474- 1527. Brill.
- Gregorovius, Ferdinand (1902). History of the City of Rome in the Middle Ages. Vol. VIII. Translated by Hamilton, Annie. George Bell & Sons.

Preceded by Ludovico II	Marquess of Saluzzo; 1504–1528	Succeeded by Giovanni Ludovico
