= Cesare Hercolani =

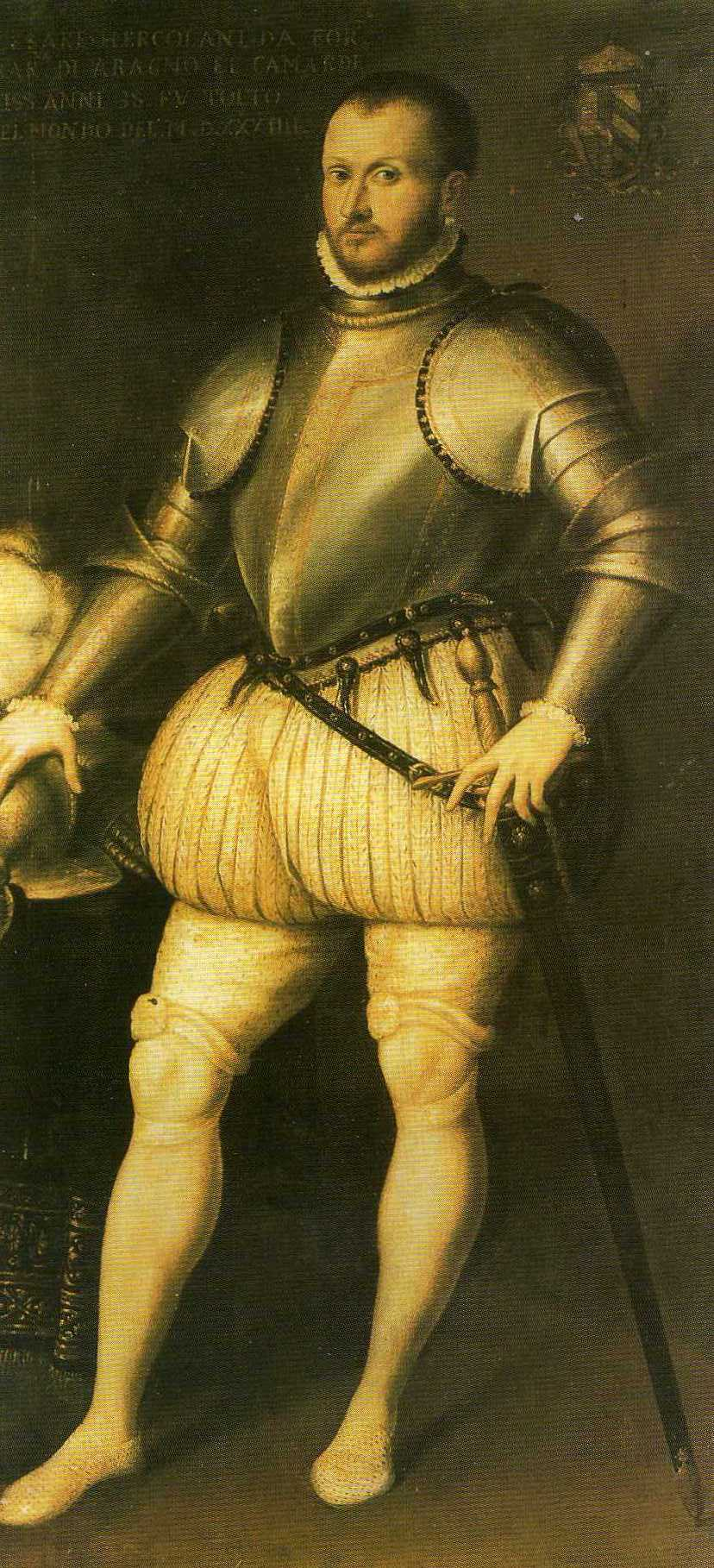

Cesare Hercolani (1499–1534) was an Italian condottiero, or mercenary leader.

He was born in Forlì (Northern Italy) in 1499. The Hercolani were a noble family, and Cesare became a venture captain under Charles V, Holy Roman Emperor.

According to the Renaissance historian Giovanni Tarcagnota, in the Battle of Pavia (1525), Hercolani injured the horse of Francis I of France, which enabled the Imperial forces to capture Francis alive and ended the battle. Although there is no exact proof of this, Hercolani received fame from this claim and was hailed as the "victor of the battle of Pavia."

In 1534 Hercolani was killed in Forlì by members of the Guelph faction, in vengeance of his action against Francis I of France.
