= Margaret of Foix-Candale =

- Marchesa consort of Saluzzo
- Born: 1473; Foix, Occitanie
- Died: 1536 (aged 62–63); Castres, Occitanie
- Buried: Cathedral of Saint-Benoît de Castres
- Spouse: Ludovico II
- Father: John de Foix, 1st Earl of Kendal
- Mother: Margaret Kerdeston

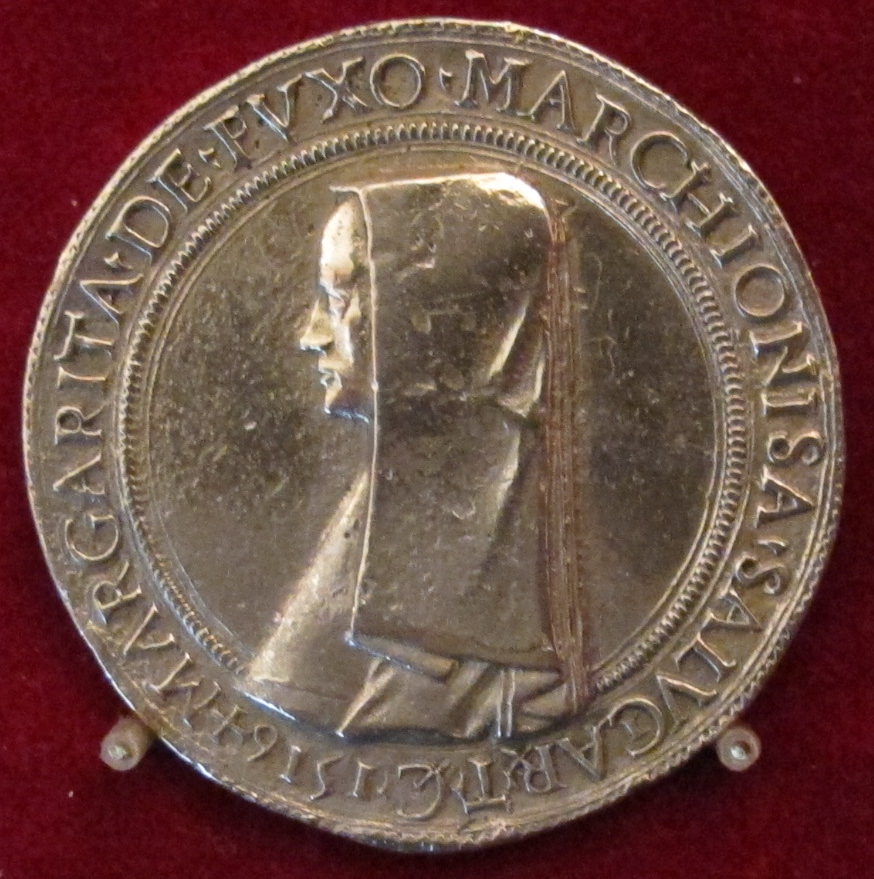

Margaret of Foix-Candale (Hungarian: Foix-Candale-i Margit saluzzói őrgrófné, 1473, – Castres, 9 September 1536), was Marchioness of Saluzzo by marriage to Ludovico II. She acted as regent of the Marquisate of Saluzzo during the minority of her son Michele Antonio in 1504-1526.

== Life ==
Margaret was the youngest daughter of John de Foix, 1st Earl of Kendal and Margaret Kerdeston.

In 1492 she married Louis II Margrave of Saluzzo. Marchioness Margaret accompanied her niece Queen Anna of Foix-Candale in 1502 from Saluzzo to Venice in the wedding tour from France to Hungary, when Queen Anna visited her paternal relatives in Saluzzo. During her second pregnancy, Queen Anna asked her aunt, Margaret to come to Buda in 1506.

The Marchioness after her husband's death acted as a regent of Marquisate of Saluzzo in the name of her first-born son, Michele Antonio. Her four surviving sons all inherited the marquisate in the order of primogeniture.

== Children ==
- Michele Antonio (26 March 1495 – 18 October 1528), Marquess of Saluzzo (1504–1528)
- Gian Ludovico (21 October 1496 – 1563), Marquess of Saluzzo (1528–1529, deposed).
- Francesco Ludovico (15 February 1498 – 28 March 1537), Marquess of Saluzzo (1529–1537)
- Adriano (20 October 1499 – June 1501).
- Gian Gabriele (26 September 1501 – 29 July 1548), Marquess of Saluzzo (1537–1548).

== Sources ==
- Tavuzzi, Michael (2007). Renaissance Inquisitors: Dominican Inquisitors and Inquisitorial Districts in Northern Italy, 1474- 1527. Brill.
- Tewes, Götz-Rüdiger (2011). Kampf um Florenz: die Medici im Exil (1494-1512) (in German). Bohlau.
