= Battle of Pavia tapestries =

Tapestries designed by Bernard van Orley

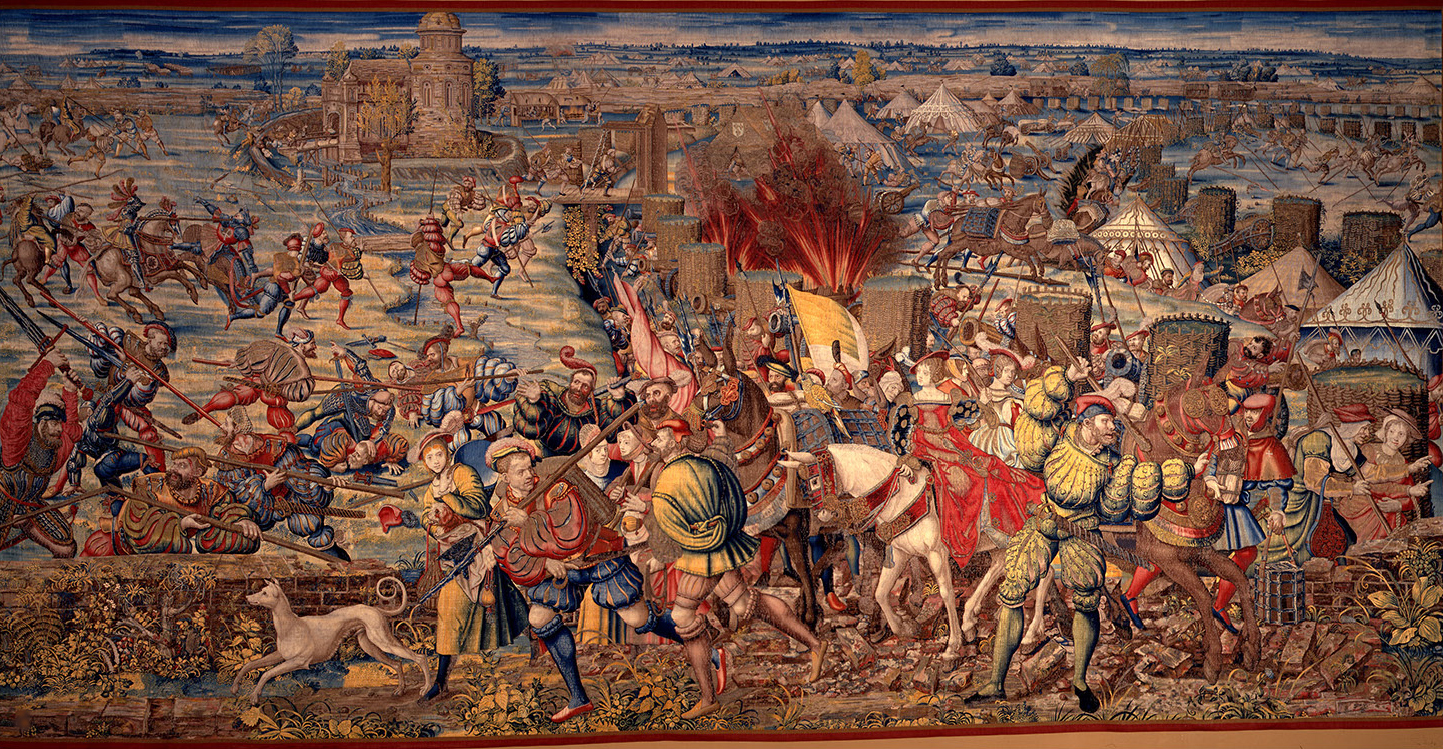
One tapestry of the set

The Battle of Pavia tapestries are a set of seven tapestries made from about 1528 to 1531 depicting events from the Battle of Pavia of 24 February 1525.

The tapestries were designed under the direction of Bernard van Orley and made in Brussels at a workshop of Willem and Jan Dermoyen. They are made of wool, silk, silver, and gold. Each weighs about one hundred pounds.

The battle was between forces of Charles V (Note: Holy Roman Emperor and Archduke of Austria from 1519 to 1556, King of Spain from 1516 to 1556, and Lord of the Netherlands as titular Duke of Burgundy from 1506 to 1555) and Francis I. (Note: King of France from 1515 to 1547) Charles V was not present at the battle, but Francis I was, and was taken prisoner in the defeat of the French side.

The tapestries are owned by the Museo e Real Bosco di Capodimonte. The tapestries are on tour in the United States in 2024 and 2025 at the Kimbell Art Museum, the M. H. de Young Memorial Museum, and the Museum of Fine Arts, Houston.
