= Francesco of Saluzzo =

Marquess of Saluzzo from 1529 to 1537

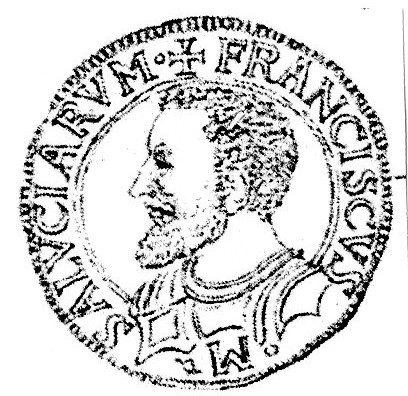
- Coin of Francesco Marquis of Saluzzo (1529–37)
- Born: 25 February 1498; Saluzzo
- Died: 28 March 1537 (aged 39); Carmagnola

Francesco Ludovico of Saluzzo (25 February 1498 – 28 March 1537) was Marquis of Saluzzo between 1529 and 1537.

Francesco was the third son of Ludovico II of Saluzzo and Margaret of Foix-Candale. He became ruler of Saluzzo when Francis I of France deposed Francesco's elder brother Giovanni Ludovico, who had tried to ally Saluzzo with Emperor Charles V.

Owing his title to the French King, Francesco couldn't prevent the Marquisate of Saluzzo becoming a satellite state of France. When John George, last Marquis of neighbouring Marquisate of Montferrat died, Francesco claimed the succession. But Montferrat was occupied by the Spanish under Emperor Charles V of Habsburg, who gave it to his ally Federico II Gonzaga, Duke of Mantua.

Francesco died in 1537 without heirs, and the rule of Saluzzo passed on to his youngest brother Gabriel.

Preceded by Giovanni Ludovico	Marquis of Saluzzo; 1529–1537	Succeeded by Gian Gabriele
