= San Lazzaro, Pavia =

Church in Pavia, Italy

San Lazzaro
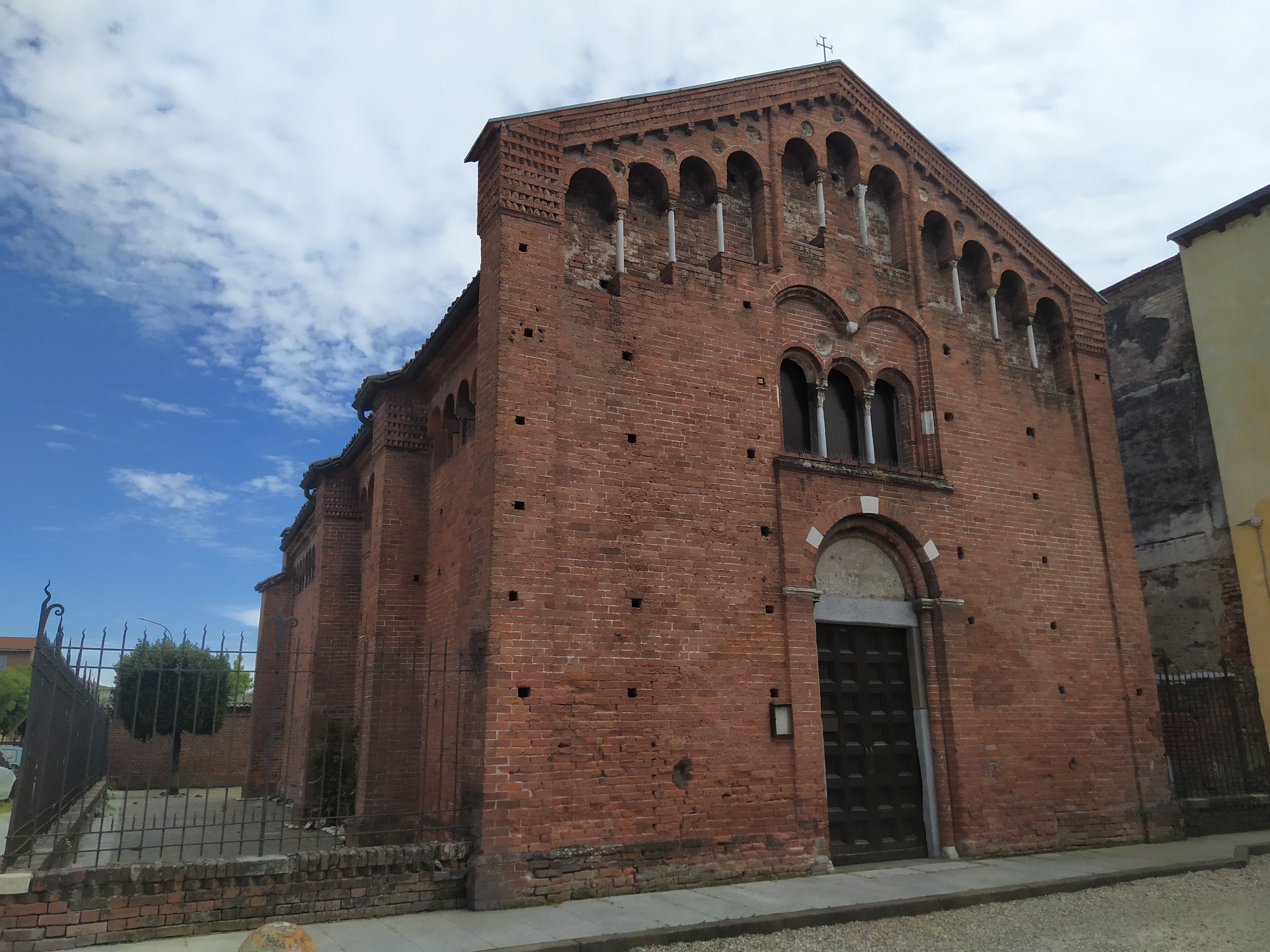

Religion
- Affiliation: Catholic
- Province: Pavia
- Status: Active

Location
- Location: Pavia, Italy
- Interactive map of San Lazzaro
- Coordinates: 45°10′45.24″N 9°11′13.72″E

Architecture
- Type: Church
- Style: Romanesque
- Completed: 1157

The Church of San Lazzaro is located on the eastern suburbs of Pavia. Built in the 12th century along the Via Francigena, it was equipped with a hospital dedicated to the care of pilgrims and lepers.

== History ==
The church is documented for the first time in a document dated 1157, with which the noble Gislenzone Salimbene, together with his sons Siro and Malastrava, donated large land properties to the church and the nearby hospital. The building was located along the Via Francigena and was intended to assist pilgrims in transit to or from Rome. In 1216 the Bishop of Pavia Fulk of Pavia dictated the statutes of the hospital, while privileges and immunities were granted to the institution by Gian Galeazzo Visconti in 1376, and others were granted through bulls issued by popes Martin V in 1426 and Paul II in 1466 The pastoral visitation of 1460 testifies that the hospital had only 4 beds, two of which housed lepers.

During the siege and subsequent battle of Pavia in 1525, the complex was occupied by the troops of Francis I, King of France, suffering considerable damage. In 1565 the hospital was elevated, by Pope Pius IV, to Commandery of the Order of Saint Lazarus. The first commander was Giuseppe Salimbene, while, a few years later, in 1572, the order was united with the Order of Saint Maurice, thus giving rise to the Order of Saints Maurice and Lazarus. Shortly afterwards the church was elevated to a parish (1571), but in 1581 Bishop Ippolito de' Rossi had the parish suppressed and reunited it with that of San Pietro in Verzolo, on which it still depends today.

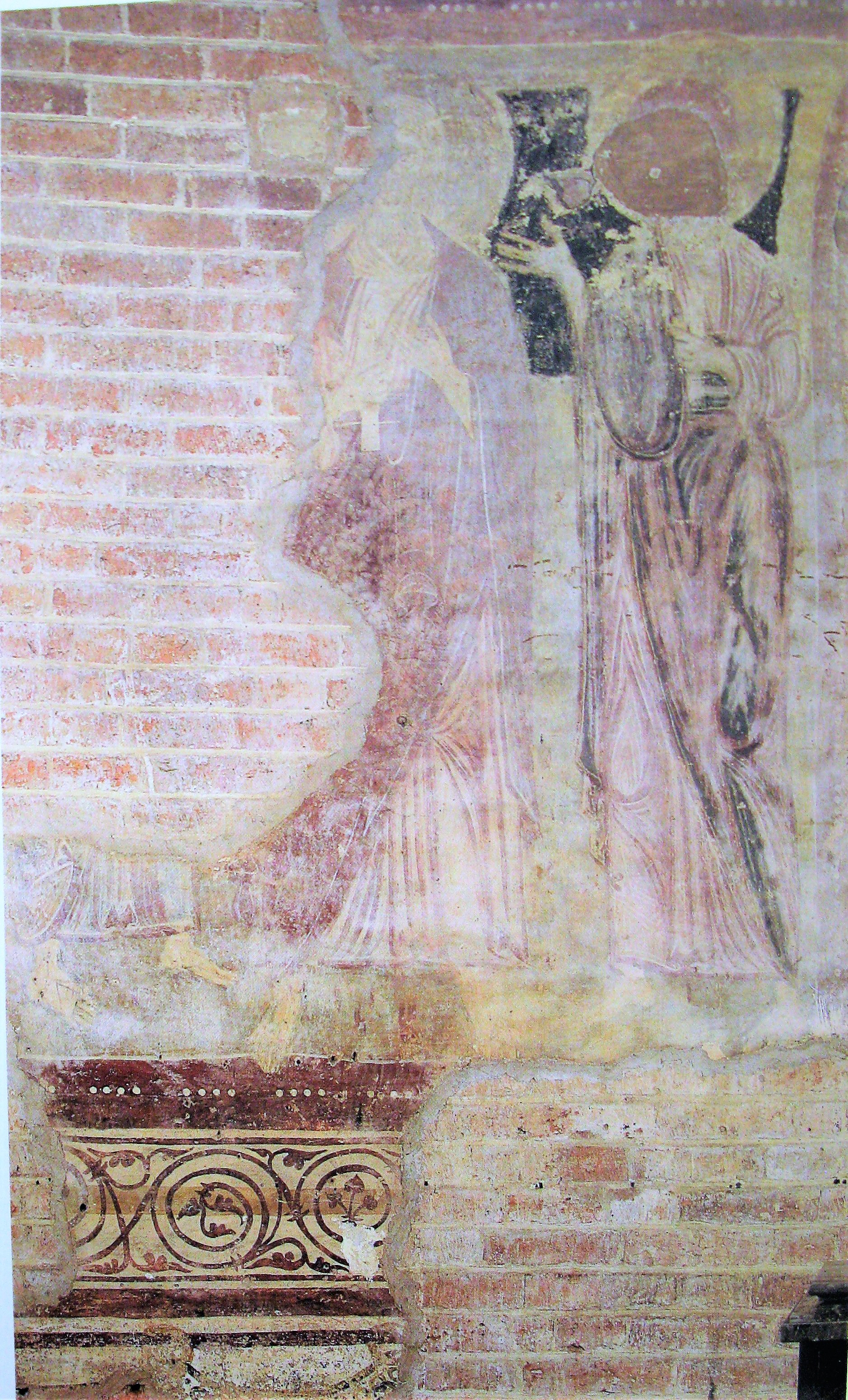
Frescoes in the apse, first decades of the XIII century.

== Architecture ==
Although small in size, the building is a unitary work in terms of design and execution and represents a clear example of Lombard Romanesque. The facade, like many other buildings in Pavia, is enriched by a blind loggia and Byzantine ceramic dishes dating back to the 13th century, while some capitals of the mullioned window in the center of the facade date back to the Carolingian age. The blind loggia decoration supported by small columns also runs along the north side of the church, where a second portal opens. The church has a single nave, and inside, in particular in the apse area, there are fragments of frescoes dated to the first half of the thirteenth century.

== Bibliography ==
- Anna Segagni Malacart, L'architettura romanica pavese, in Storia di Pavia, III/3, L’arte dall’XI al XVI secolo, Milano, Banca Regionale Europea, 1996, pp. 115– 227
