= Battle of Pavia =

Part of the Italian War (1521–1526)

- Part of the Italian War of 1521–1526
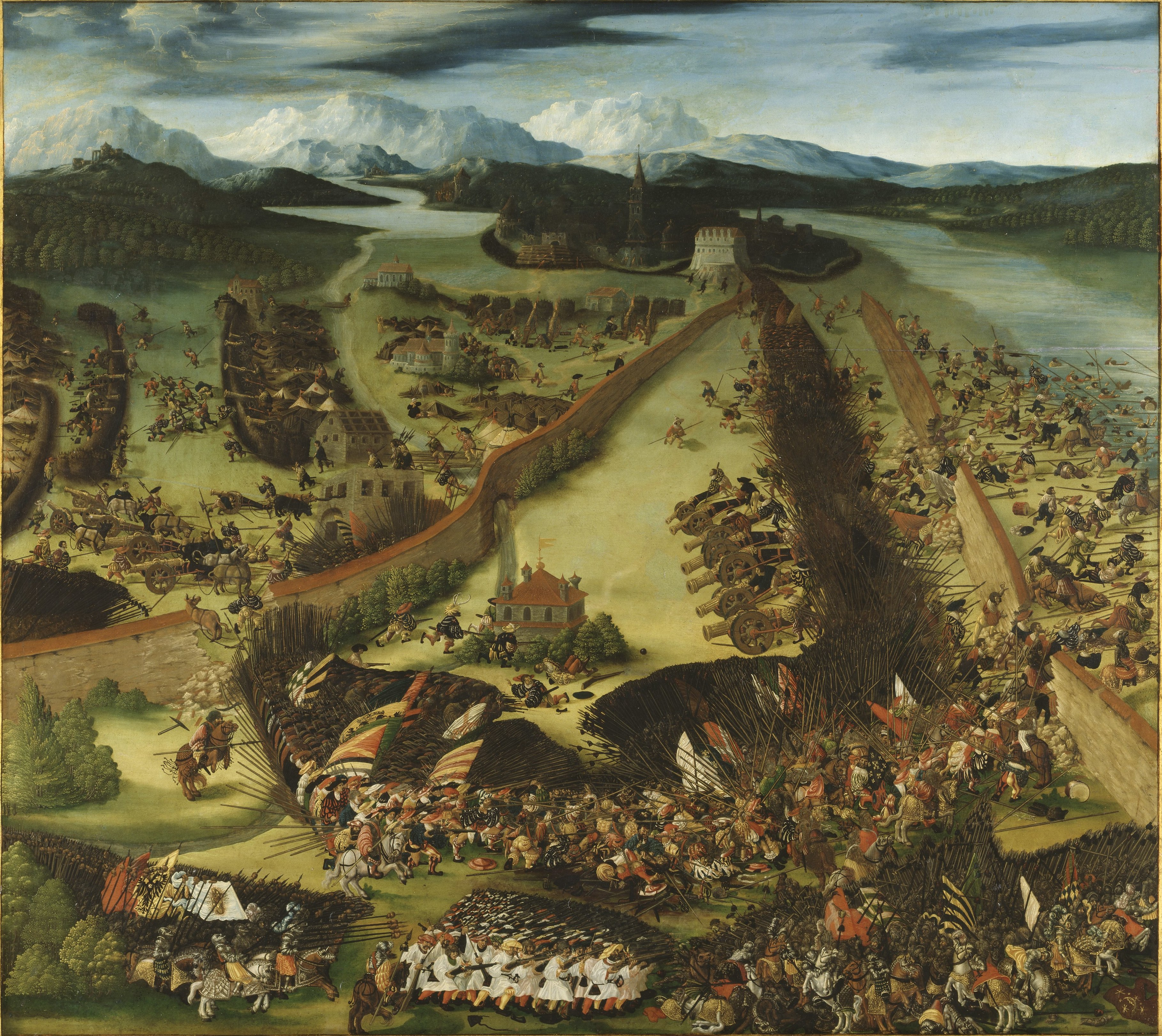
- Ruprecht Heller, The Battle of Pavia (1529), Nationalmuseum, Stockholm
Date	24 February 1525
Location	Pavia, Duchy of Milan (in present-day Italy) 45.1975°N 9.1650°E
Result	Habsburg victory

Belligerents
Kingdom of France; Marquisate of Saluzzo (Kingdom of Navarre) Navarre	Empire of Charles V: Holy Roman Empire; Habsburg Spain

Commanders and leaders
(Kingdom of France) Francis I (POW) (Kingdom of France) Robert de La Marck (surrendered) (Kingdom of France) Anne de Montmorency (surrendered) (Kingdom of Navarre) Henry II of Navarre (surrendered) (Kingdom of France) Francois de Lorraine † (Kingdom of France) Richard de la Pole † (Kingdom of France) Jacques de la Palice † (Kingdom of France) Louis de la Tremoille † (Kingdom of France) Seigneur de Bonnivet † (Kingdom of France) Charles IV, Duke of Alençon (Kingdom of France) Marquess of Saluzzo	(Holy Roman Empire) (Spain) Charles de Lannoy (Holy Roman Empire) (Spain) Fernando d'Ávalos (Holy Roman Empire) (Spain) Charles de Bourbon (Holy Roman Empire) (Spain) Georg von Frundsberg (Holy Roman Empire) (Spain) Alfonso d'Avalos (Holy Roman Empire) (Spain) Fernando de Andrade (Holy Roman Empire) (Spain) Antonio de Leyva (Pavia)

Strength
26,200: 9,000 German and Italian Black Bands; 8,000 Swiss mercenaries; 6,000 French foot soldiers; 2,000 gendarmes; 1,200 lances fournies	28,300: 12,000 Germans; 5,000 Spaniards; 3,000 Italians; 1,500 knights and 800 lances; 6,000 troops stationed in Pavia (Note: 5,000 Germans, 1,000 Spaniards)

Casualties and losses
8,000–15,000	1,000–1,500

The Battle of Pavia, fought on the morning of 24 February 1525, was the decisive engagement of the Italian War of 1521–1526 between the Kingdom of France and the Habsburg Empire of Charles V, Holy Roman Emperor as well as ruler of Spain, Austria, the Low Countries, and the Two Sicilies.

The French army was led by King Francis I of France, who laid siege to the city of Pavia (then part of the Duchy of Milan within the Holy Roman Empire) in October 1524 with 26,200 troops. The French infantry consisted of 6,000 French foot soldiers and 17,000 foreign mercenaries: 8,000 Swiss, 5,000 Germans, and 4,000 Italians (Black Bands). The French cavalry consisted of 2,000 gendarmes and 1,200 lances fournies. Charles V, intending to break the siege, sent a relief force of 22,300 troops to Pavia (where the Imperial garrison stationed consisted of 5,000 Germans and 1,000 Spaniards) under the command of the Fleming Charles de Lannoy, Imperial lieutenant and viceroy of Naples, and of the French renegade and captain-general Charles III, Duke of Bourbon. Other major Imperial commanders were the Italian condottiero Fernando d'Avalos, the German military leader Georg Frundsberg, and the Spanish captain Antonio de Leyva, who was in charge of the Imperial garrison inside Pavia. The Habsburg infantry consisted of 12,000 Germans (Landsknechte), 5,000 Spaniards, and 3,000 Italians. Within the infantry, Imperial arquebusiers formed a part of the Spanish colunellas and of the German doppelsöldners. The Imperial cavalry consisted of 1,500 knights and 800 lances.

The battle was fought in the Visconti Park of Mirabello di Pavia, outside the city walls. In the four-hour battle that took place during foggy conditions, the French army was split and defeated in detail. Francis led his armored cavalry in a medieval-style charge using couched lances, a questionable tactic in the new age of gunpowder. His horsemen rode in front of his cannons, making it impossible for the artillery to fire at the enemy. Francis' Swiss mercenary pikemen were unwilling to fight, while troops under the Duke of Alençon remained unengaged due to the overall confusion. Many of the chief nobles of France were killed, and others – including Francis I himself – were captured. The historian Francesco Guicciardini summarised the clash as follows:

The King, fighting very gallantly, sustained the shock of the enemy, who, however, with their firearms obliged those about him to give way, till, the Swiss arriving and the cavalry charging them in flank, the Spaniards were repulsed. But the Germans easily broke the Swiss with great slaughter, their valour no way corresponding that day with the courage they had shown in previous battles. The King, in the meantime, having been with a great number of his men at arms in the midst of the battle, and endeavoured to stop the flight of his men, after a long combat, his horse killed under him, himself wounded in the face and in the hand, and fallen to the ground, was taken by some soldiers who did not know him. But when the Viceroy came up he discovered himself to him, who, after kissing his hand with profound reverence, received him prisoner in the name of the Emperor.

Francis was imprisoned in the nearby tower of Pizzighettone and later transferred to Spain, where Charles V was residing for his upcoming marriage with Isabella of Portugal. Together they signed the Treaty of Madrid of 1526, by which Francis abandoned claims over the Imperial Duchy of Milan and ceded Burgundy to the House of Habsburg in exchange for his freedom. Francis, however, denounced the treaty after his liberation and soon re-opened hostilities over Burgundy and Milan.

== Prelude ==
The French, in possession of Lombardy at the start of the Italian War of 1521–26, had been forced to abandon it after their defeat at the Battle of Bicocca in 1522. Determined to regain it, Francis ordered an invasion of the region in late 1523, under the command of Guillaume Gouffier, Seigneur de Bonnivet; but Bonnivet was defeated by Imperial troops at the Battle of the Sesia and forced to withdraw to France.

Viceroy of Naples Charles de Lannoy now launched an invasion of Provence under the command of Fernando d'Ávalos, Marquis of Pescara and Charles III, Duke of Bourbon (who had recently betrayed Francis and allied himself with the Emperor). The Imperial and Spanish armaments and soldiers for the battle were substantially financed by Jakob Fugger's German bank, as well as the Castilian bank Banca Palenzuela Levi Kahana. While initially successful, the Imperial offensive lost valuable time during the Siege of Marseille and was forced to withdraw back to Italy by the arrival of Francis and the main French army at Avignon.

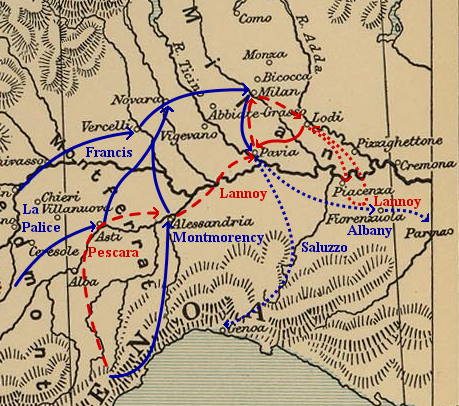
The French advance into Lombardy, and the Pavia campaign of 1524–25. French movements are indicated in blue and Imperial movements in red.

In mid-October 1524, Francis himself crossed the Alps and advanced on Milan at the head of an army numbering more than 40,000. Bourbon and Pescara, their troops not yet recovered from the campaign in Provence, were in no position to offer serious resistance. The French army moved in several columns, brushing aside Imperial attempts to hold its advance, but failed to bring the main body of Imperial troops to battle. Nevertheless, Lannoy, who had concentrated some 16,000 men to resist the 33,000 French troops closing on Milan, decided that the city could not be defended and withdrew to Lodi on 26 October. Having entered Milan and installed Louis II de la Trémoille as the governor, Francis (at the urging of Bonnivet and against the advice of his other senior commanders, who favoured a more vigorous pursuit of the retreating Lannoy) advanced on Pavia, where Antonio de Leyva remained with a sizable Imperial garrison of about 9,000.

The bulk of the French army arrived at Pavia in the last days of October. By 2 November, Anne de Montmorency had crossed the Ticino River and invested the city from the south, completing its encirclement. Inside were about 9,000 men, mainly mercenaries whom Antonio de Leyva was able to pay only by melting the church plate. A period of skirmishing and artillery bombardments followed, and several breaches had been made in the walls by mid-November. On 21 November, Francis attempted an assault on the city through two of the breaches but was beaten back with heavy casualties; hampered by rainy weather and a lack of gunpowder, the French decided to wait for the defenders to starve.

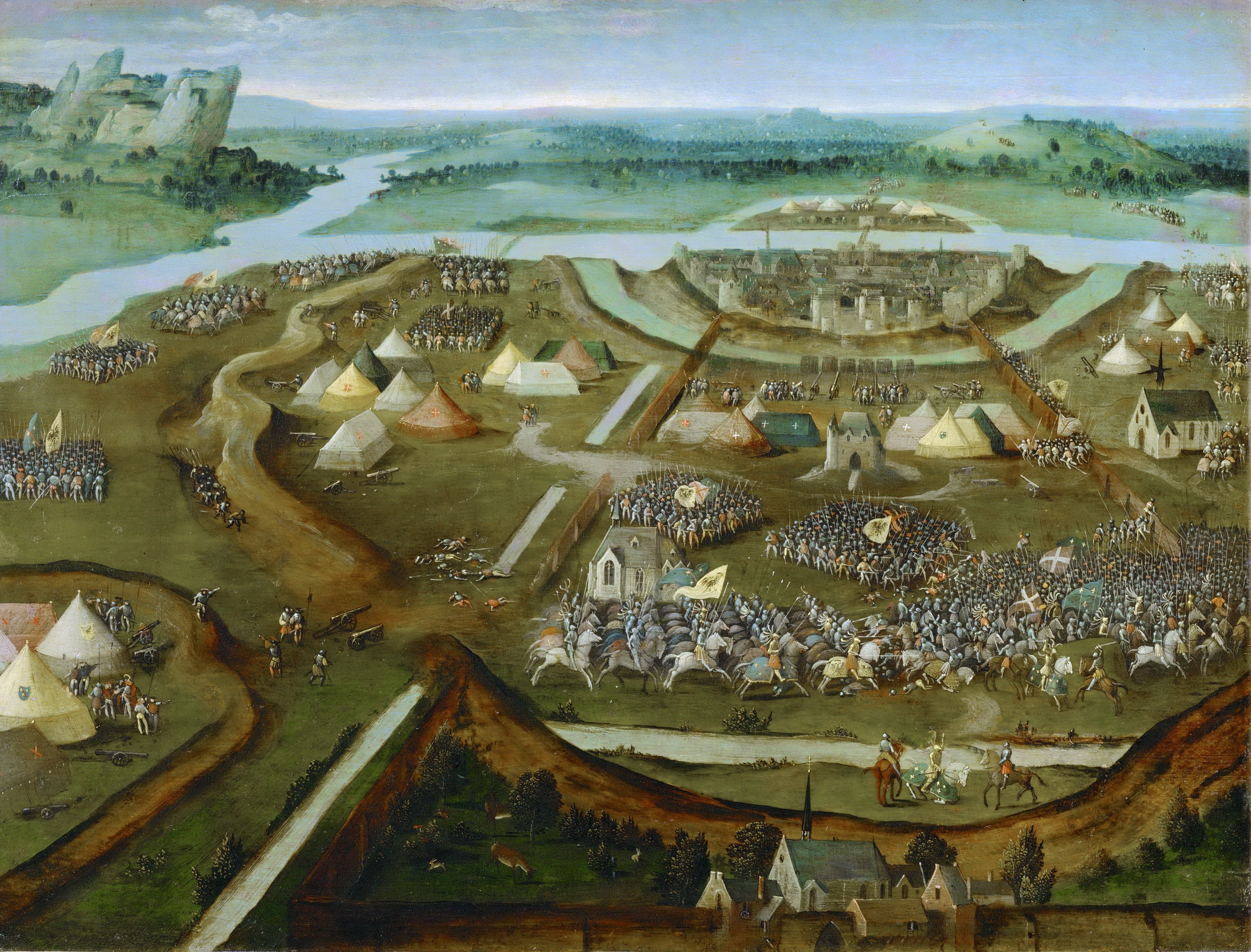
The Battle of Pavia, by a follower of Joachim Patinir

In early December, a Spanish force commanded by Hugo de Moncada landed near Genoa, intending to interfere in a conflict between pro-Valois and pro-Habsburg factions in the city. Francis dispatched a larger force under the Marquis of Saluzzo to intercept them. Confronted by the more numerous French and left without naval support by the arrival of a pro-Valois fleet commanded by Andrea Doria, the Spanish troops surrendered. Francis then signed a secret agreement with Pope Clement VII, who pledged not to assist Charles in exchange for Francis's assistance with the conquest of Naples. Against the advice of his senior commanders, Francis detached a portion of his forces under the Duke of Albany and sent them south to aid the Pope. Lannoy attempted to intercept the expedition near Fiorenzuola, but suffered heavy casualties and was forced to return to Lodi by the intervention of the infamous Black Bands of Giovanni de' Medici, Italian mercenaries which had just entered French service. Medici then returned to Pavia with a supply train of gunpowder and shot gathered by the Duke of Ferrara; but the French position was simultaneously weakened by the departure of nearly 5,000 Grisons Swiss mercenaries, who returned to their cantons to defend them against marauding landsknechts.

In January 1525, Lannoy was reinforced by the arrival of Georg Frundsberg with 15,000 fresh landsknechts from Germany and renewed the offensive.

The Visconti Park

Pescara captured the French outpost at Sant'Angelo Lomellina, cutting the lines of communication between Pavia and Milan, while a separate column of landsknechts advanced on Belgiojoso and, despite being briefly pushed back by a raid led by Medici and Bonnivet, occupied the town. By 2 February, Lannoy was only a few miles from Pavia. Francis had encamped the majority of his forces in the great walled Visconti Park of Mirabello outside the city walls, placing them between Leyva's garrison and the approaching relief army. Skirmishing and sallies by the garrison continued through February. Medici was seriously wounded and withdrew to Piacenza to recuperate, forcing Francis to recall much of the Milan garrison to offset the departure of the Black Band; but the fighting had little overall effect.

On 21 February, Lannoy and the Imperial commanders, running low on supplies and mistakenly believing that the French forces were more numerous than their own, decided to launch an attack on Mirabello Castle, where they believed the French headquarters to be, in order to at least demoralize the French sufficiently to ensure a safe withdrawal. Pescara, one of the most experienced commanders, heavily pressed for this attack, advising Lannoy: "to pray to God for one hundred years of war and not one day of battle, this is my advice; but here, battle is our only way".

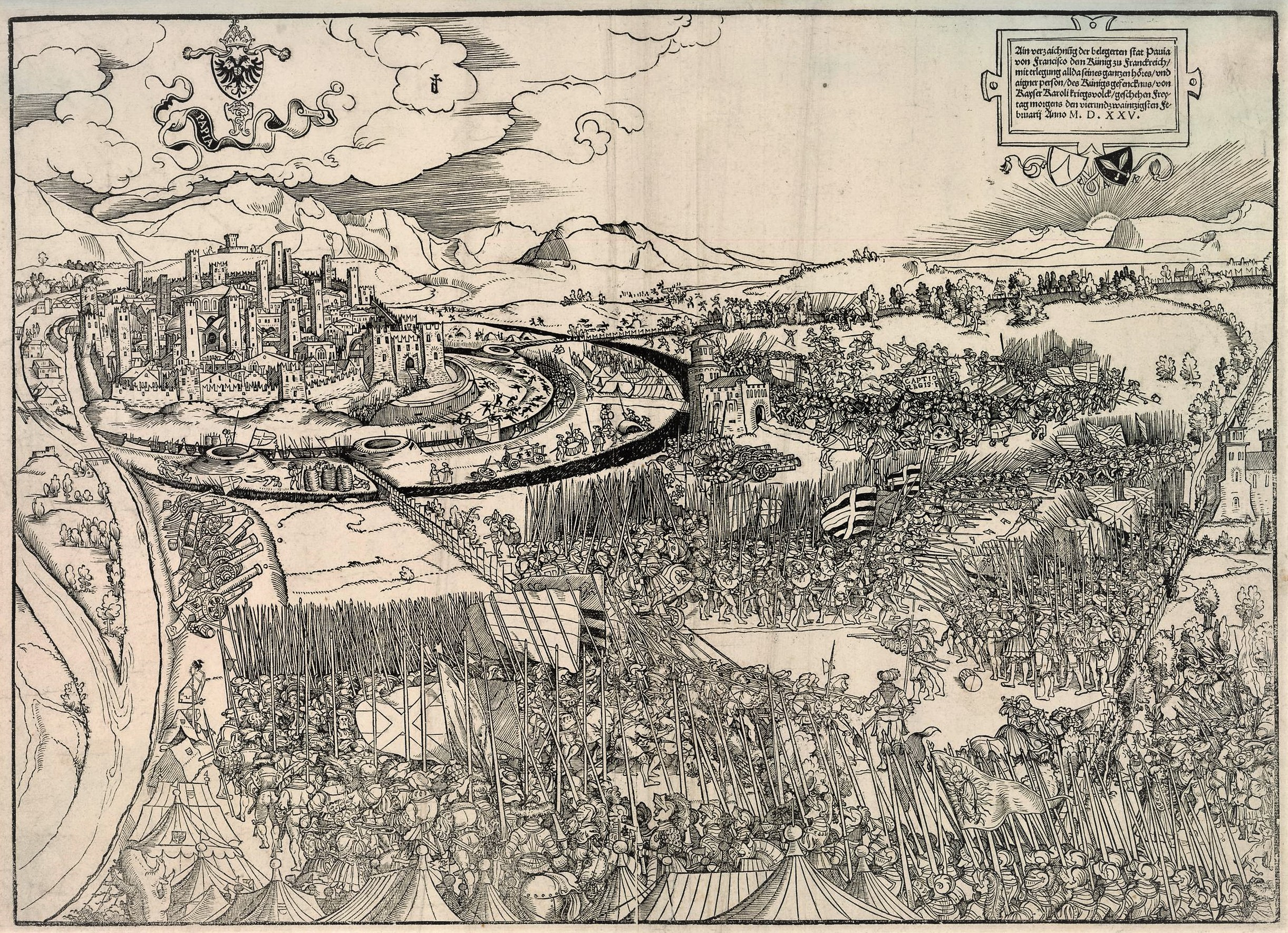
Joerg Breu, The Battle of Pavia, woodcut. c. 1525

== Battle ==
The times given here are taken from Konstam's reconstruction of the battle.

=== Movements in the dark ===
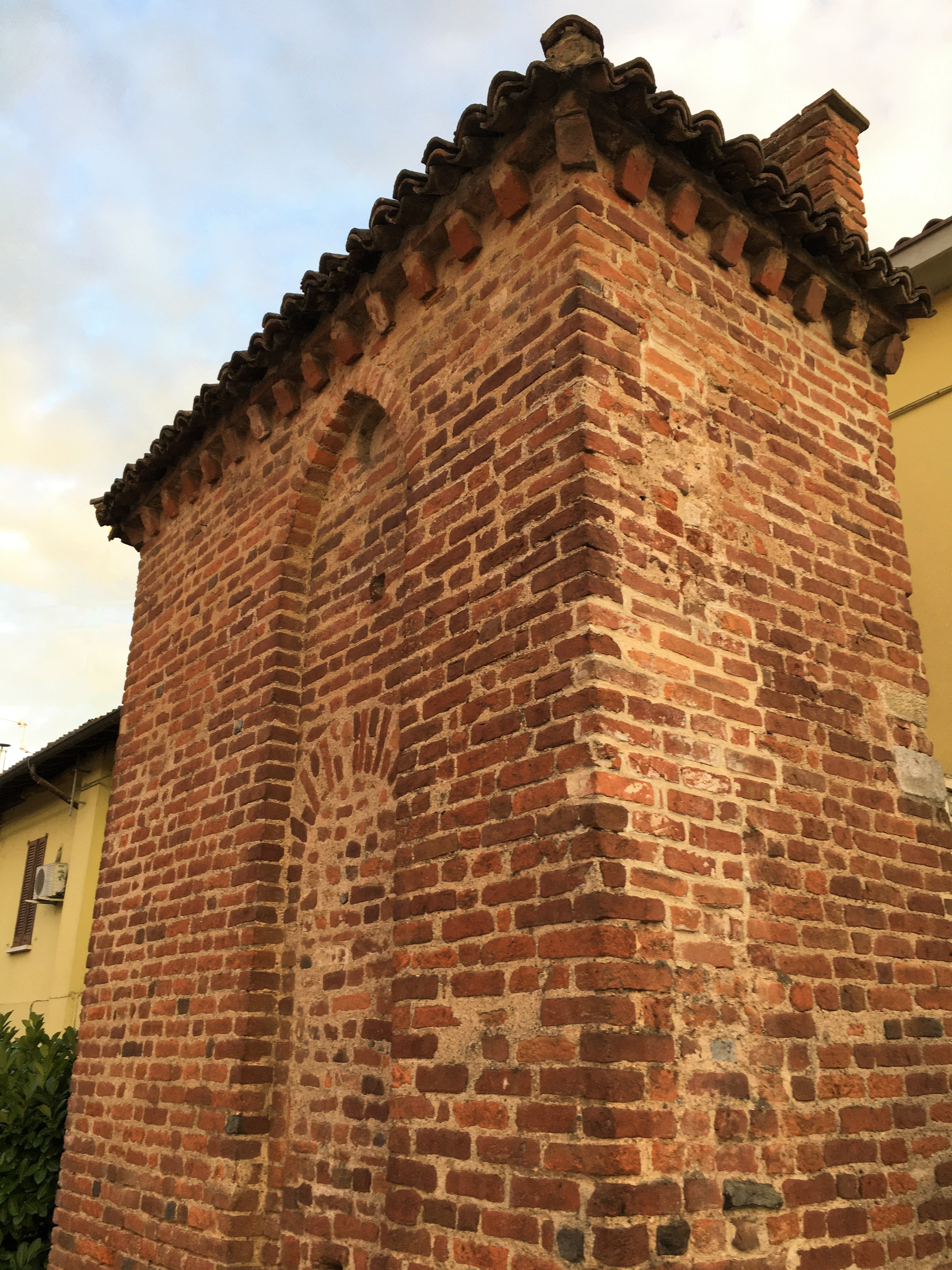
Remains of the Porta Pescarina of the Visconti Park, San Genesio ed Uniti, where the Imperial troops entered the Park

On the evening of 23 February, Lannoy's imperial troops, who had been encamped outside the east wall of the Visconti Park, began their march north along the walls. Although Konstam indicates that at the same time, the Imperial artillery began a bombardment of the French siege lines – which had become routine during the extended siege – to conceal Lannoy's movement, Juan de Oznaya (a soldier who participated in the battle and wrote about it in 1544) indicates that at that moment, the Imperial troops set their tents on fire to mislead the French into believing that they were retreating. Meanwhile, Imperial engineers quickly worked to create a breach in the park walls, at the Porta Pescarina near the village of San Genesio, through which the Imperial army could enter. By 5:00 am, some 3,000 arquebusiers under the command of Alfonso d'Avalos, Marquis of Vasto had entered the park and were rapidly advancing on Mirabello Castle; simultaneously, Imperial light cavalry spread out from the breach into the park, intending to intercept any French movements.

Meanwhile, a detachment of French cavalry under Charles Tiercelin encountered the Imperial cavalry and began a series of skirmishes with them. A mass of Swiss pikemen under Robert de la Marck, Seigneur de la Flourance moved up to assist them, overrunning a battery of Spanish artillery that had been dragged into the park. They missed Vasto's arcabuceros – who had by 6:30 am emerged from the woods near the castle, and swiftly overrun it – and blundered into 6,000 of Georg Frundsberg's landsknechts. By 7:00 am, a full-scale infantry battle had developed not far from the original breach.

=== Francis attacks ===
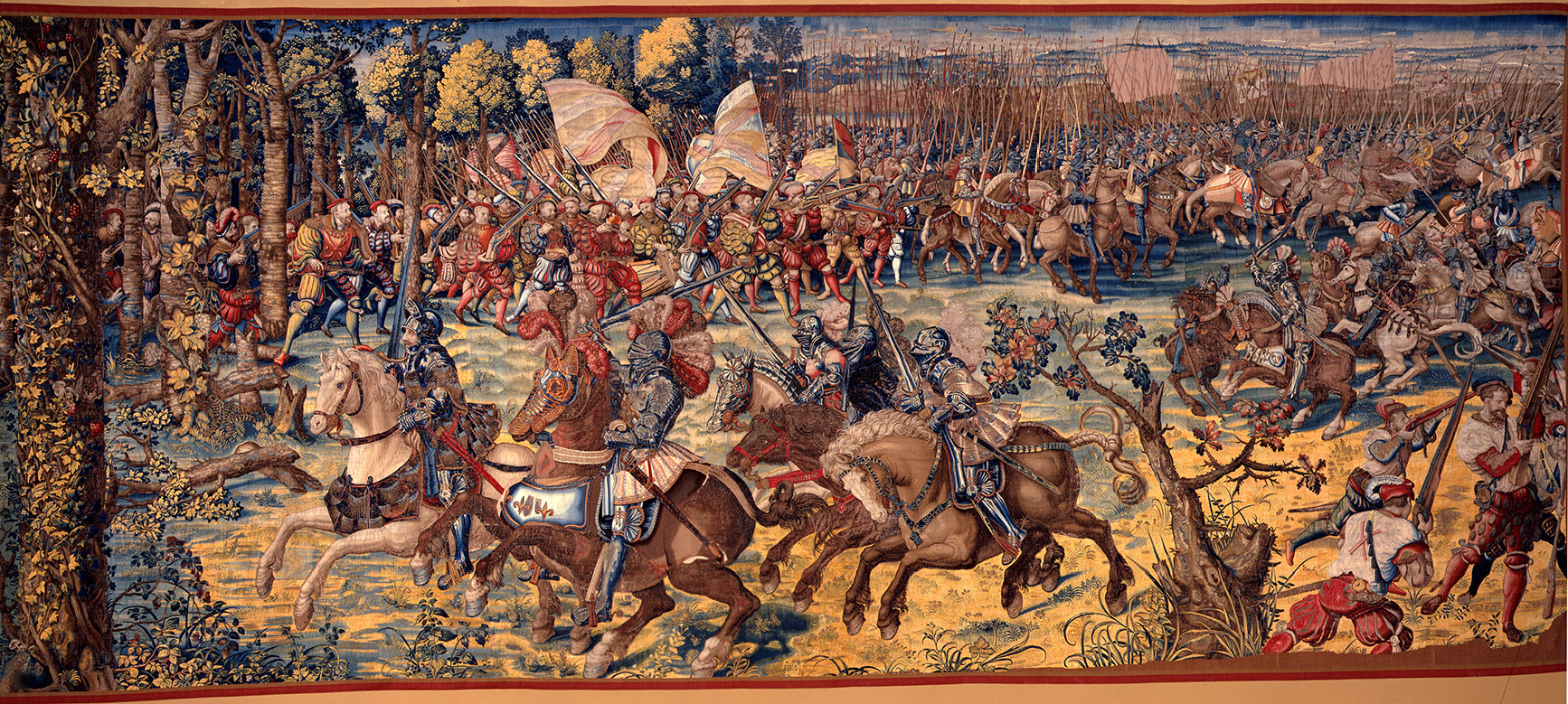
Detail of tapestry illustrating the Battle of Pavia

A third mass of troops – the German and Spanish heavy cavalry under Lannoy himself, as well as Pescara's Spanish infantry – had meanwhile been moving through the woods to the west, closer to where Francis was encamped. The French did not realize the magnitude of the Imperial attack for some time; however, by about 7:20 am, Pescara's advance had been spotted by a battery of French artillery, which commenced firing on the Spanish lines. This alerted Francis, who launched a charge against Lannoy's outnumbered cavalry with the entire force of French gendarmes, scattering the Spanish by 7:40 am.

Francis's precipitate advance, however, had not only masked the fire of the French artillery, but also pulled him away from the mass of French infantry, commanded by Richard de la Pole, and by Francois de Lorraine, who led the Black Band of renegade landsknecht pikemen (not to be confused with the Italian mercenary company of arquebusiers by the same name), which was 4,000 to 5,000 men strong. Pescara, left in command of the Spanish forces after Lannoy had followed the retreating cavalry, formed his men up at the edge of the woods and sent messengers to Bourbon, Frundsberg, and Vasto requesting assistance.

Frundsberg meanwhile mauled the heavily outnumbered Swiss infantry opposing him; Tiercelin and Flourance were unable to hold their troops together, and the French foot began to flee the field.

=== Endgame ===
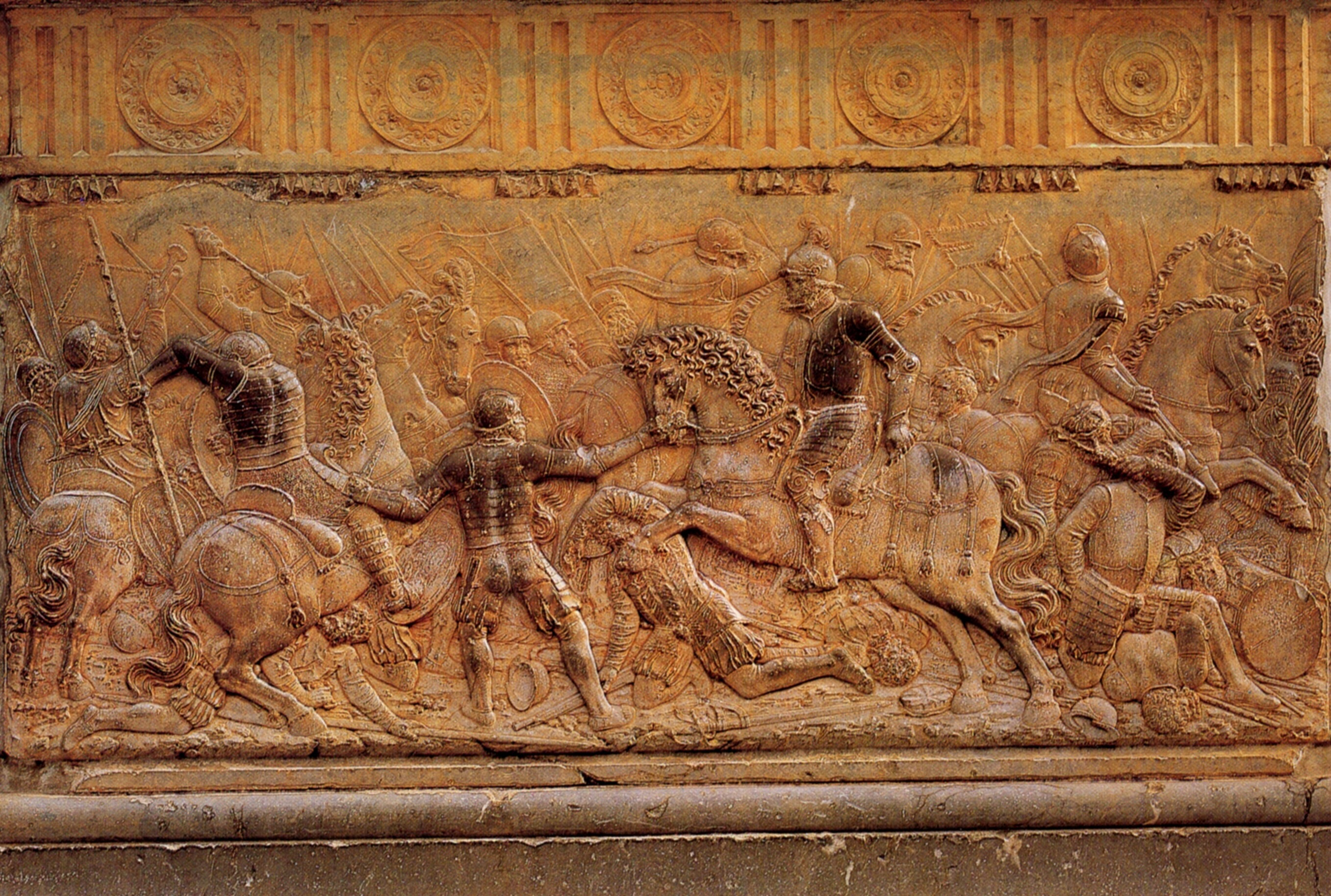
The Battle of Pavia by Juan de Orea

By 8:00 am, a mass of Imperial pikemen and arquebusiers descended on the French cavalry from all sides. Lacking room to manoeuvre because of the surrounding woods, the French gendarmes were surrounded and systematically killed. Richard de la Pole and Lorraine, advancing to assist Francis, were met by Frundsberg's arriving landsknechts; the French infantry was broken and routed, and de la Pole and Lorraine were both killed. In a particularly bitter contest between Imperial and freelance landsknechts, the Black Band was surrounded by Frundsberg's pikemen and exterminated where it stood. The French king fought on as his horse was killed under him by Cesare Hercolani, an Italian Condottiero; surrounded by Spanish arquebusiers and German landsknechts, he was taken prisoner and escorted from the field.

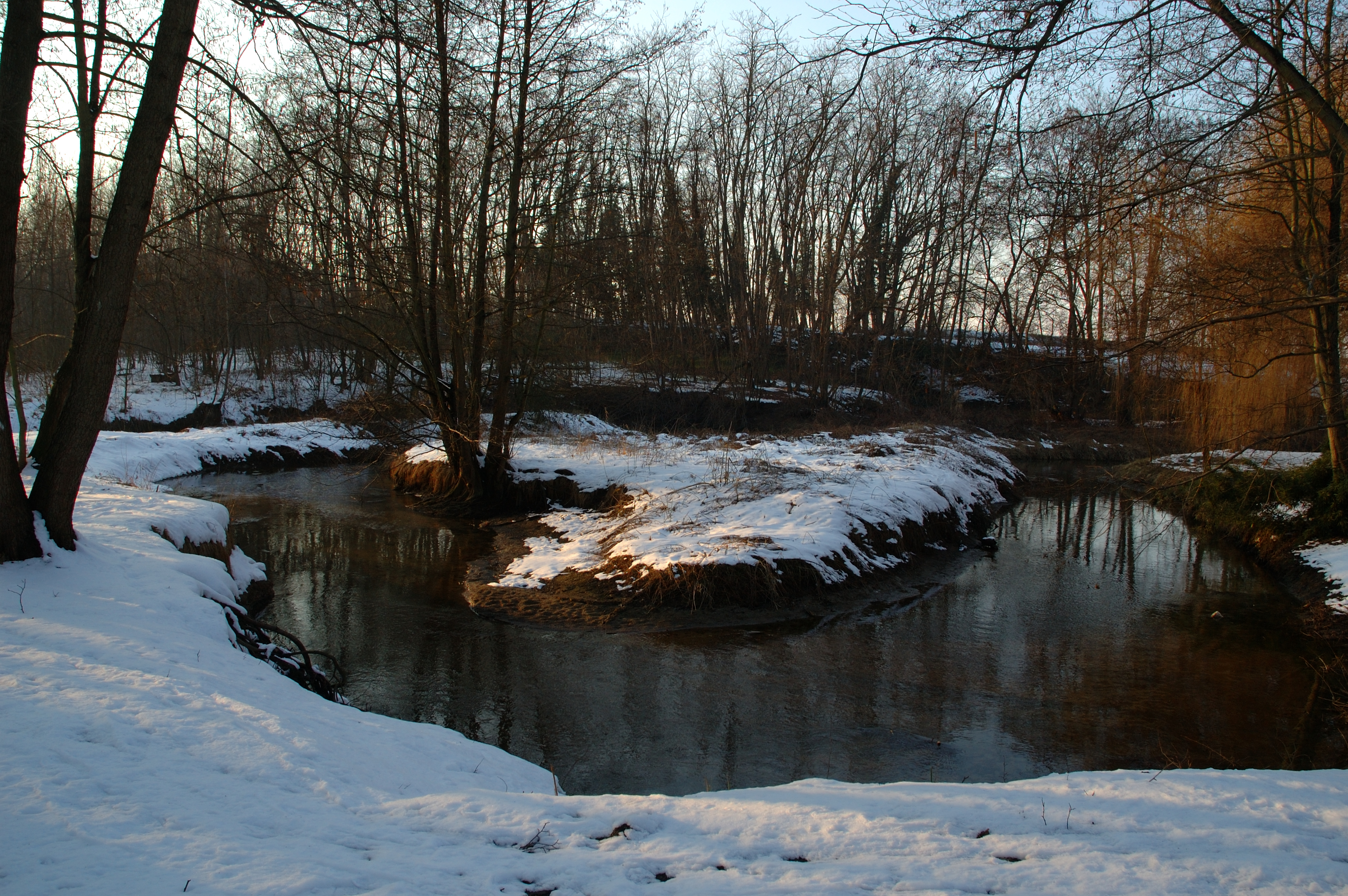
In the central part of the Visconti Park there is now the Vernavola Park, along these banks the imperial arquebusiers decimated the French gendarmes

Meanwhile, Antonio de Leyva had sortied with the garrison, overrunning the 3,000 Swiss under Montmorency that had been manning the siege lines. The remnants of the Swiss – both Montmorency's and Flourance's – tried to flee across the river, suffering massive casualties as they did. The French rearguard, under the Duke of Alençon, had taken no part in the battle; when the Duke realized what had occurred in the park, he quickly began to retreat towards Milan. By 9:00 am, the battle was over.

=== Francis's capture and consequences ===
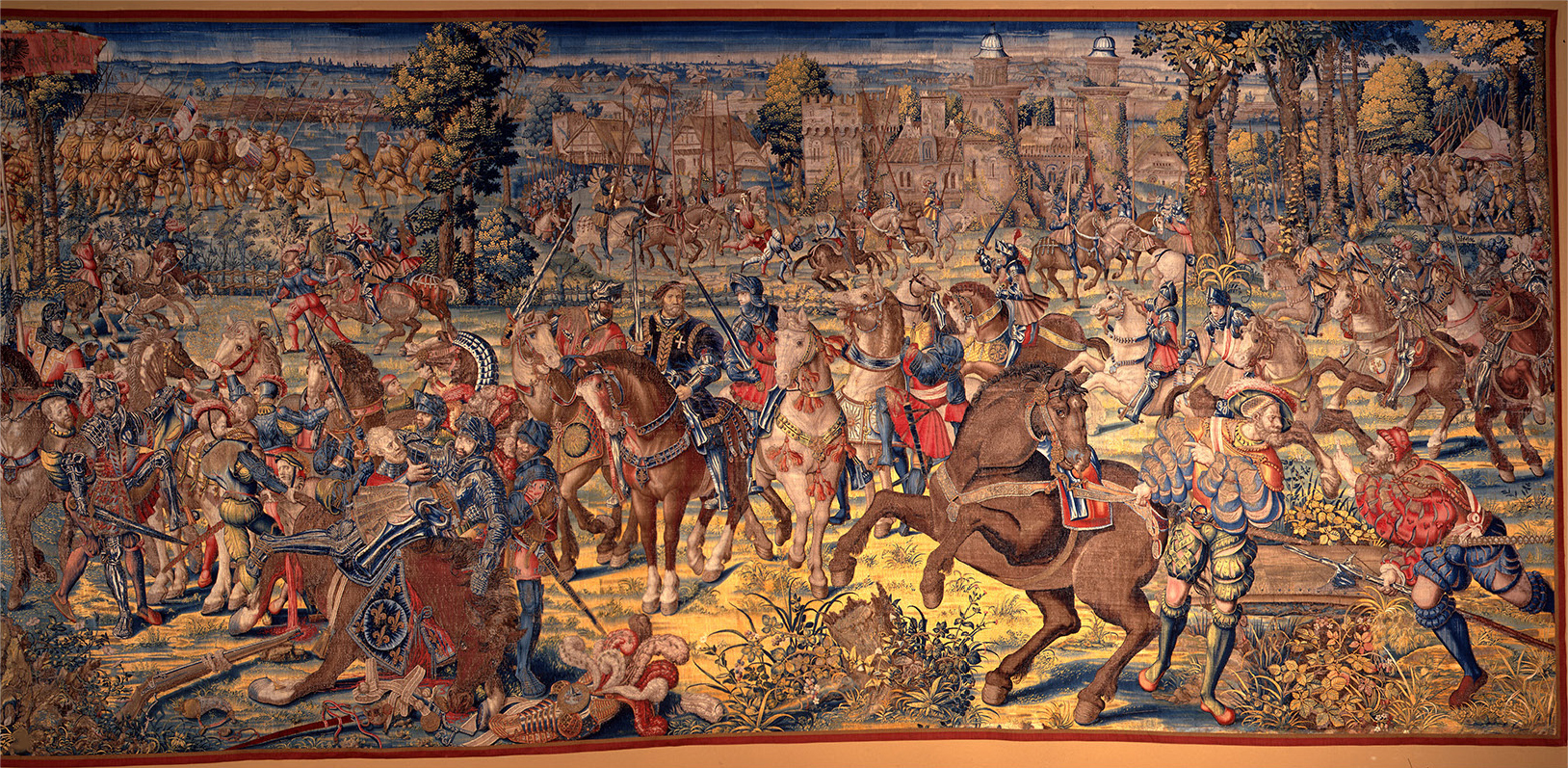
The capture of the French king Francis

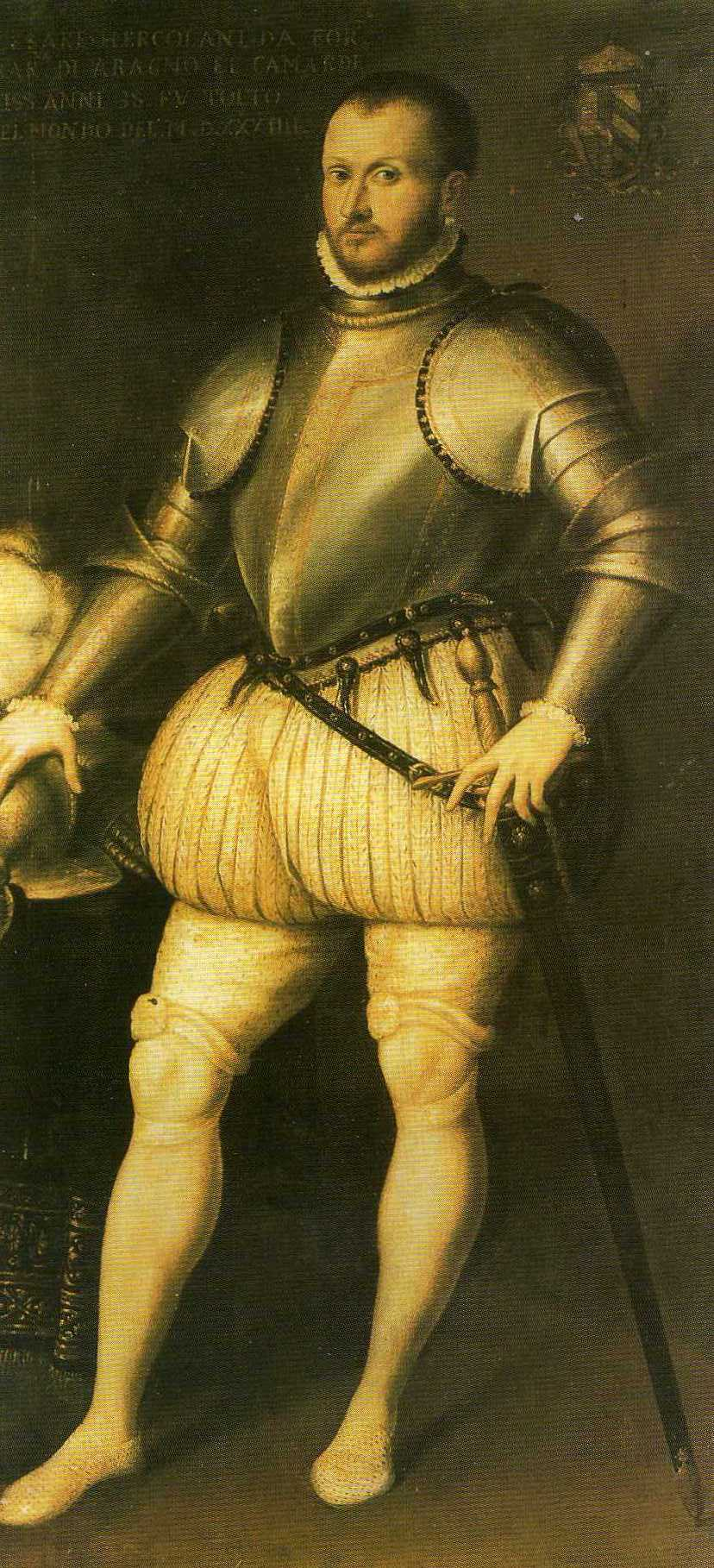
Cesare Hercolani

The exact nature of Francis's surrender—in particular, who exactly had taken him prisoner—is uncertain, with a variety of candidates put forward by historians, including:

- Charles de Lannoy himself, who made King Francis his prisoner as the two exchanged their swords. According to an account, Lannoy kneeled in front of Francis out of respect.
- Three Spanish soldiers: namely Alonso Pita da Veiga, Juan de Urbieta and Diego Dávila.
- "Some Germans" who, according to an early report of the battle, found Francis on the ground and wanted to kill him but spared his life after he shouted that he was the king of France.
- Nicholas, Count of Salm, made a member of the Order of the Golden Fleece for the capture of King Francis.
- The Italian condottiero Cesare Hercolani, who was rewarded as a "hero of Pavia" by Charles V.
- Other individuals proposed in some accounts as crucial for the capture are Pedro de Valdivia, the future conqueror of Chile, who may have prevented another soldier from killing Francis by mistake and two French traitors, followers of Charles de Bourbon, who might have persuaded King Francis to surrender.

The fact of the matter is that the individuals mentioned above were all given credit for the capture of Francis I in various ways, and Charles V himself honoured different people for the achievement over the years. The decree granting a coat of arms to Alonso Pita da Veiga for his deeds at the Battle of Pavia, was archived at the General Archive of Simanca (Archivo general de Simancas, legajo 388, rotulado de "Mercedes y Privilegios.') and was issued by Emperor Charles V on 24 July 1529. In that decree, Charles V does not credit a single individual but, rather, a group of individuals that includes da Veiga: " ..... and in the same battle, you (Alonso Pita da Veiga) accomplished so much that you reached the person of said King (Francis I of France) and captured him, jointly with the other persons that captured him." (" .... y en la misma batalla ficistes tanto que allegastes á la misma persona del dicho Rey, y fuistes en prenderle, juntamente con las otras personas que le prendieron ....") Finally, in his autobiography, Charles V claimed that "the King was made prisoner by his principal captains", crediting the Duke of Bourbon, Charles de Lannoy, and the Marquis of Pescara.

=== Aftermath ===
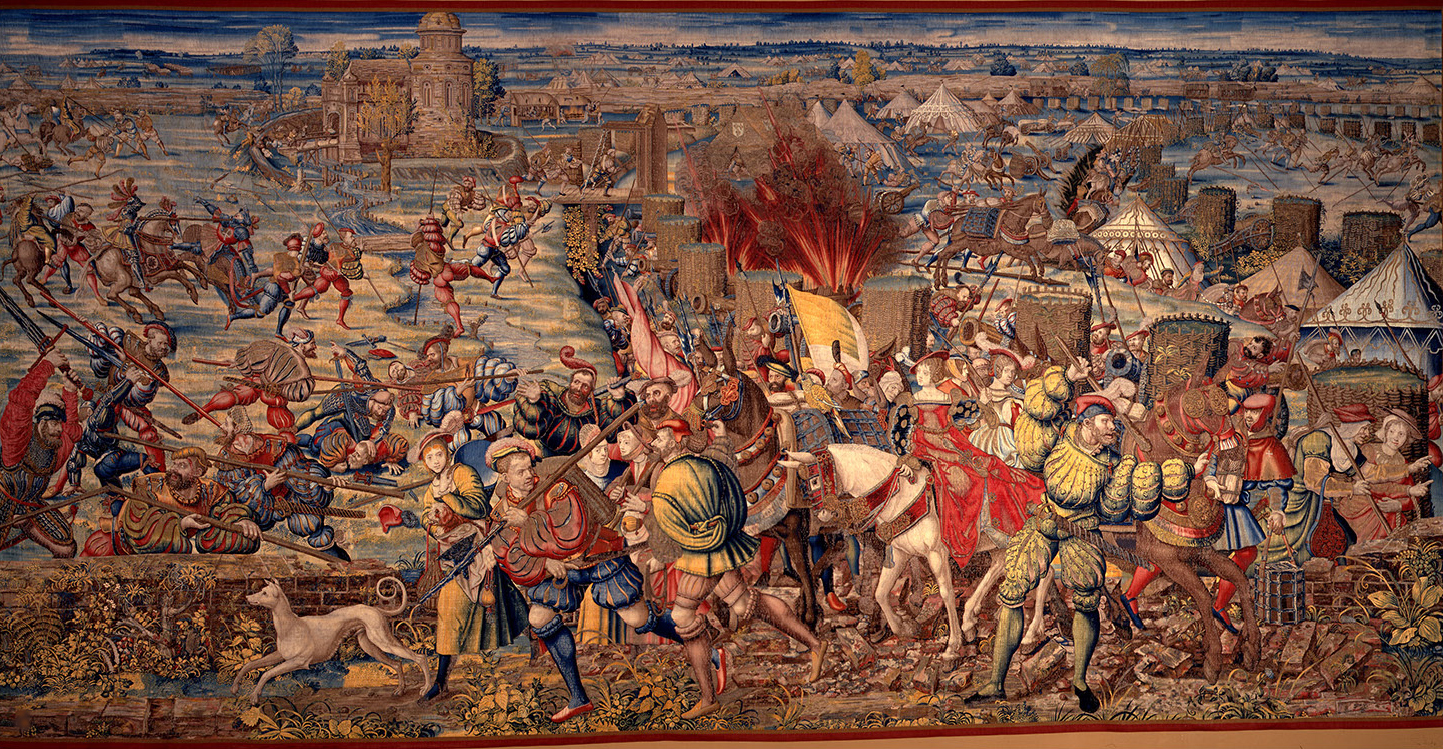
The Flight of the French Women in the Battle of Pavia, one of a tapestry suite woven at Brussels c. 1528–31 after cartoons by Bernard van Orley

The French defeat was decisive. Aside from Francis, a number of leading French nobles, including Montmorency and Flourance, had been captured; an even greater number – among them Bonnivet, La Tremoille, Thomas de Foix-Lescun, René of Savoy, La Palice, Richard de la Pole (the last Yorkist and pretender to the English crown) and Lorraine – had been killed in the fighting. Francis was taken to the fortress of Pizzighettone, where he wrote a letter to Louise of Savoy, his mother:

To inform you of how the rest of my ill-fortune is proceeding, all is lost to me save honour and life, which is safe...

Soon afterwards, he finally learned that the Duke of Albany had lost the larger part of his army to attrition and desertion, and had returned to France without ever having reached Naples. The broken remnants of the French forces, aside from a small garrison left to hold the Castel Sforzesco in Milan, retreated across the Alps under the nominal command of Charles IV of Alençon, reaching Lyon by March.

Charles de Lannoy kept Francis I in his custody and imprisoned him in a tower of Pizzighettone. The king was then brought to Genoa and from there he was taken to Spain. He remained jailed in a tower in Madrid until the Treaty of Madrid was signed. According to the treaty, Francis I abandoned his claims over Flanders, Milan and Burgundy. However, the peace treaty was broken in the same year and a new French-Imperial war lasted from 1526 to 1529.

== Art ==
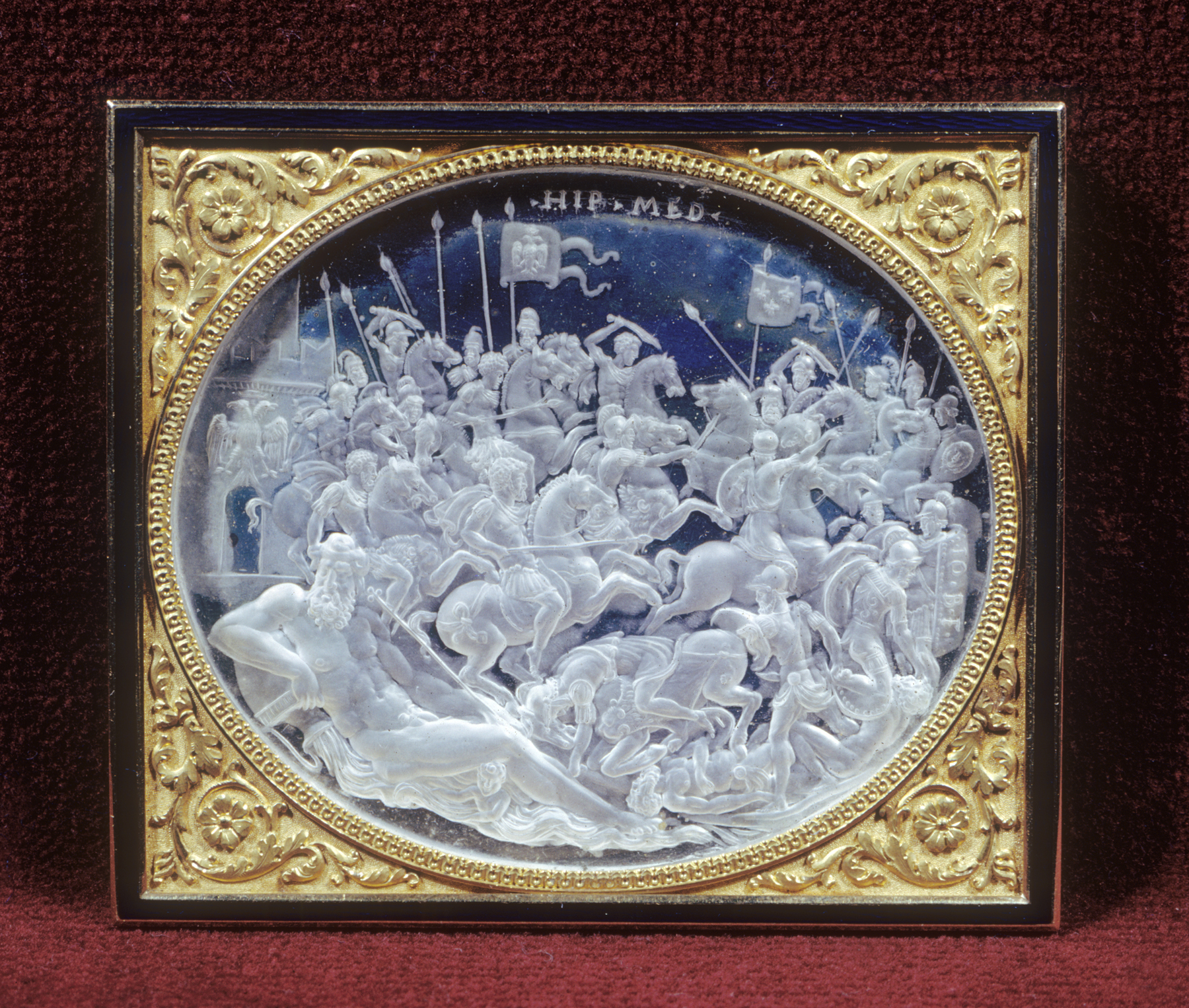
The Battle of Pavia in an engraved rock crystal cameo relief commissioned by Cardinal Ippolito de' Medici, by Giovanni Bernardi, Rome, c 1531–35 (Walters Art Museum, Baltimore)

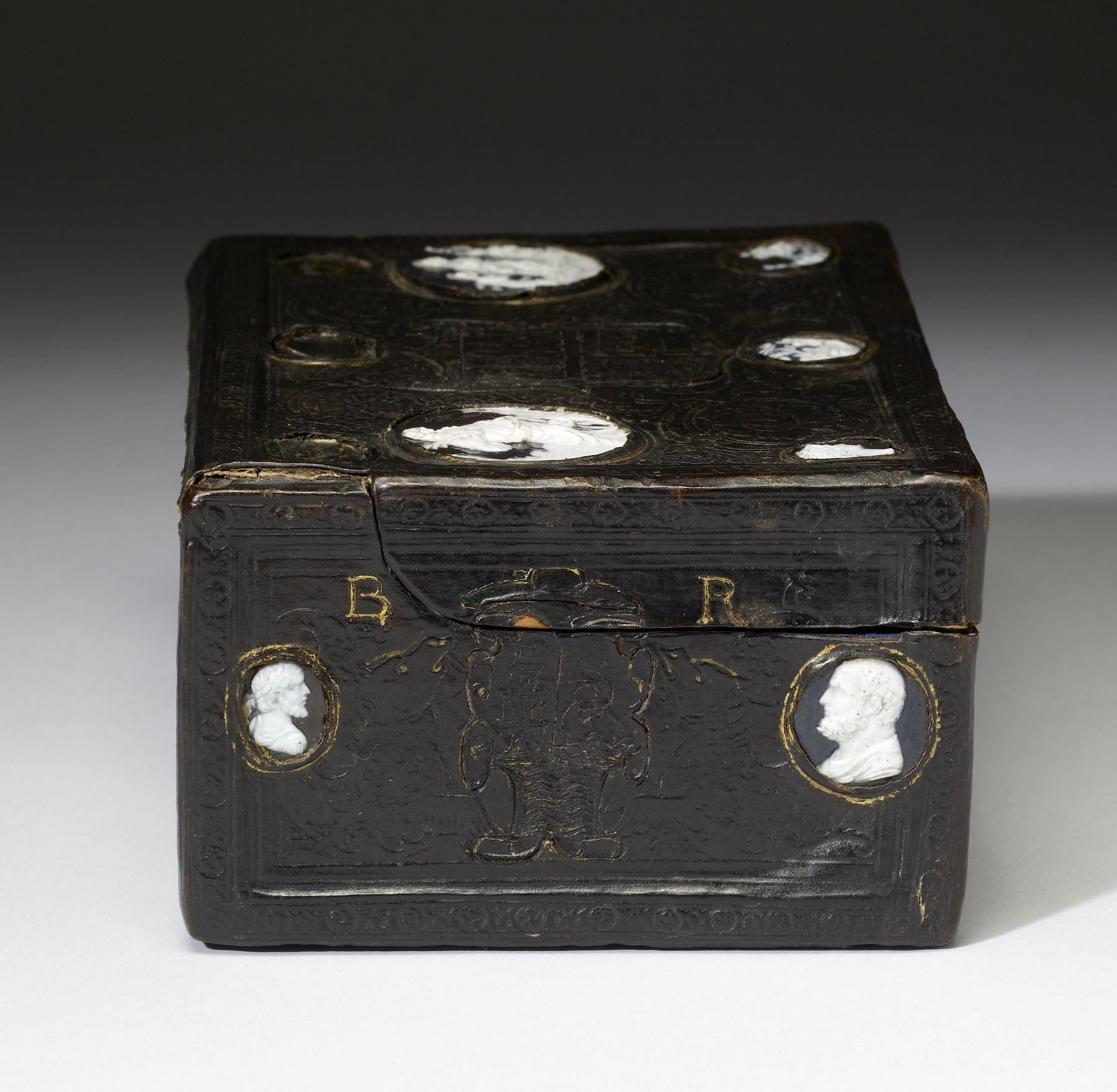
Leather Box for the Pennant of Francis I at the Battle of Pavia (Walters Art Museum, Baltimore)

In Rome Cardinal Ippolito de' Medici, who acted as Florentine emissary to Charles V in 1535, expressed support for the Emperor's victory by commissioning a rock crystal low relief in the manner of an Antique cameo, from the gem engraver Giovanni Bernardi. The classicizing treatment of the event lent it a timeless, mythic quality and reflected on the culture and taste of the patron.

An oil-on-panel Battle of Pavia, painted by an anonymous Flemish artist, depicts the military engagement between the armies of Charles V and Francis I. Because of its detail, the painting is considered an accurate visual record, probably based on eyewitness accounts. A suite of seven Brussels tapestries after cartoons by Bernard van Orley (above right) celebrate the Imperial–Spanish victory. A set is kept in the Capodimonte Museum in Naples; they were donated to Charles V in 1531 by the Estates General of the Spanish Netherlands.

== Battlefield today ==
Much of the battle took place within the immense hunting reserve of the Dukes of Milan, the Visconti Park, which extended for over 2,200 hectares. The Visconti Park no longer exists, most of its woods having been cut down between the sixteenth and seventeenth centuries to make room for fields. However three natural reserves survive that can be considered the heirs of the park. They are the heronry of the Carola, that of Porta Chiossa and the Vernavola Park, which cover an area of 148 hectares. In particular, some of the most important episodes of the battle took place inside the Vernavola park, which extends southwest of the Mirabello Castle.

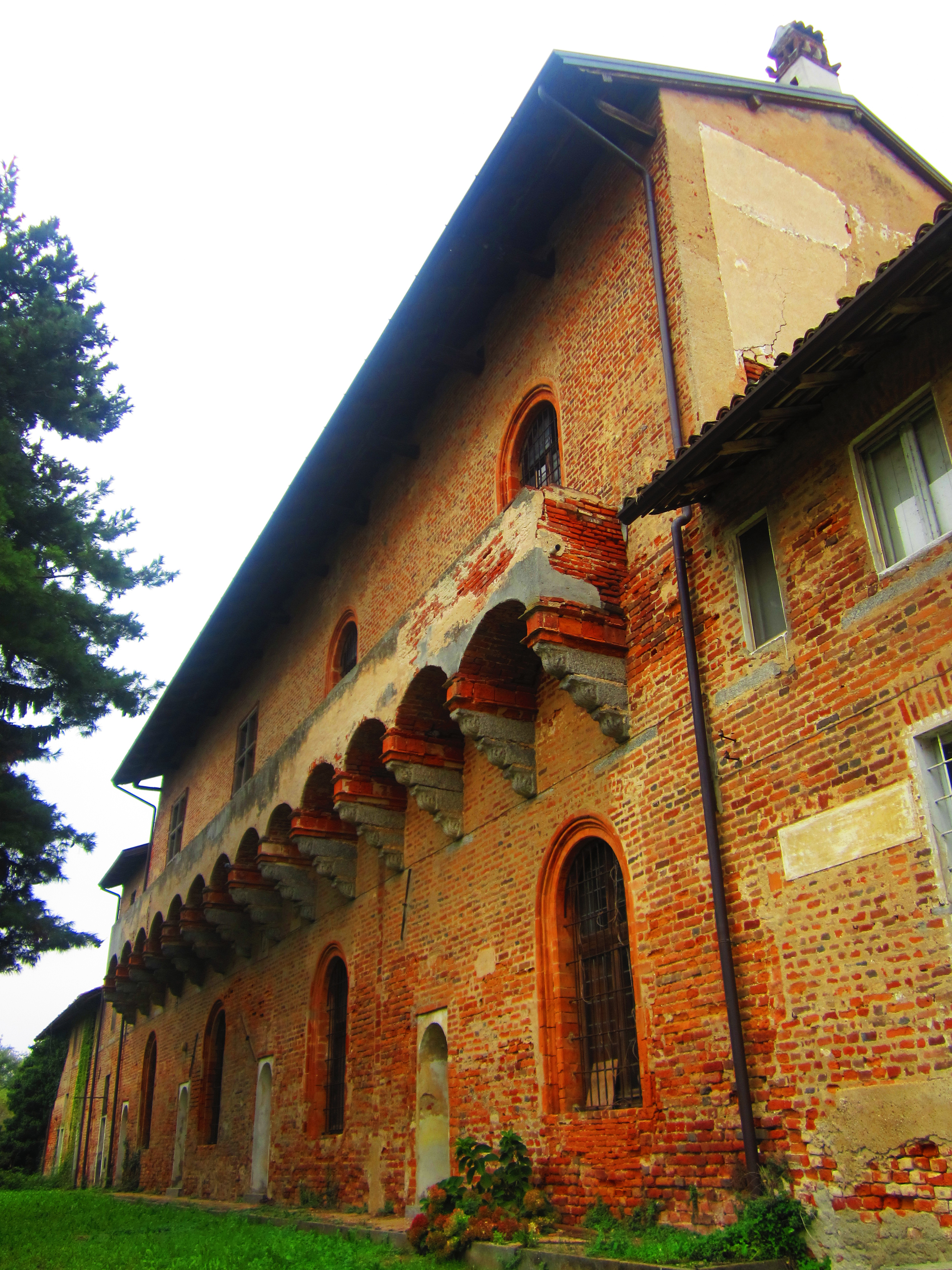
Mirabello Castle

Near the park, in 2015, two cannonballs were found during some agricultural work, probably fired by French artillery. Although partially mutilated during the eighteenth and nineteenth centuries, when it was transformed into a farm, the Mirabello Castle, once the seat of the ducal captain of the park, still stands today a short distance from Vernavola and preserves inside some curious decorative elements (fireplaces, frescoes and windows) not yet adequately restored and studied, in French late Gothic style, added to the structure of the Sforza period during the first French domination of the Duchy of Milan (1500- 1513). About two kilometres to the north, along the Cantone Tre Miglia road, is the Repentita farmhouse, where Francesco I was captured and, according to tradition, was housed. The complex still retains parts of the fifteenth-century masonry and an inscription placed on the external wall recalls the event.

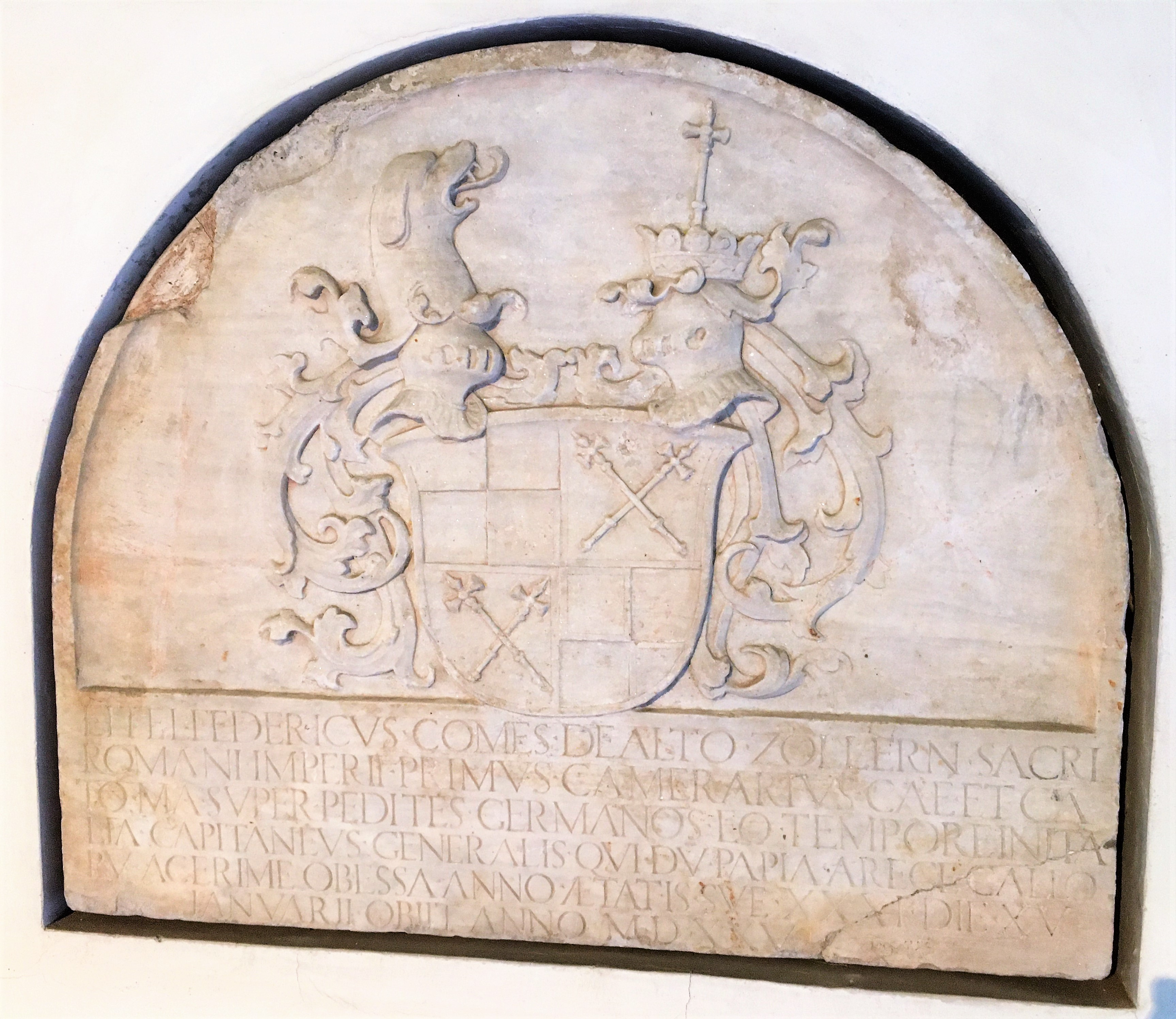
Tombstone of Eitel Friedrich III, captain of the Landsknechte from the basilica of San Pietro in Ciel d'Oro, now in the Civic Museums

In the nearby town of San Genesio ed Uniti in via Porta Pescarina there are some of the remains of the park gate where, in the night between 23 and 24 February 1525, the imperials made the three breaches that started the battle. Less evident are the traces of the battle in Pavia: the city walls, which defended the city during the siege, were replaced, around the middle of the sixteenth century, by robust bastions, partly preserved. Instead, in addition to the Visconti Castle (where the tombstone of Eitel Friedrich III, Count of Hohenzollern, captain of the Landsknechte is preserved), two gates of the medieval walls: Porta Nuova and Porta Calcinara. The eastern outskirts of Pavia are home to some monasteries (almost all now deconsecrated) that hosted the Swiss and German mercenaries of Francis I, such as the monastery of Santi Spirito and Gallo, that of San Giacomo della Vernavola, that of San Pietro in Verzolo and the Church of San Lazzaro, while in the western one there is the church of San Lanfranco (where Francis I was based) and the basilica of Santissimo Salvatore. In the church of San Teodoro there is a large fresco depicting the city during the siege of 1522, in it, with a certain wealth of detail, Pavia and its surroundings are depicted, exactly as they must have appeared at the time of the battle.
