= Giovanni Ludovico of Saluzzo =

Marquess of Saluzzo from 1528 to 1529

Giovanni Ludovico
- Marquess of Saluzzo
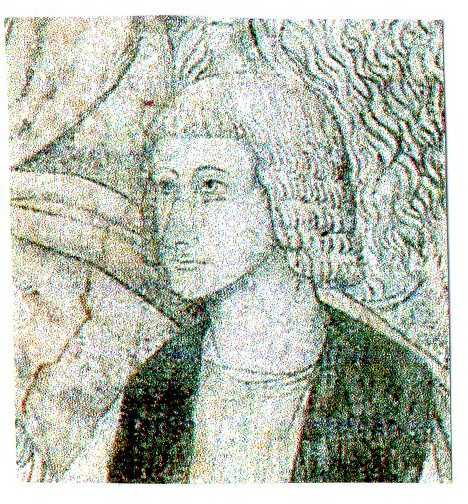
- effigy of Giovanni Ludovico
- Born: 21 October 1496; Saluzzo
- Died: 1563 (aged 66–67); Beaufort
- Buried: Notre-Dame de Beaufort-en-Vallée
- Noble family: Aleramici
- Father: Ludovico II of Saluzzo
- Mother: Margaret of Foix-Candale

Giovanni Ludovico of Saluzzo (also spelled Gian Ludovico; c. 1496–1563) was marquess of Saluzzo in 1528–1529.

== Biography ==
The second eldest son of Ludovico II of Saluzzo and Margaret of Foix-Candale, he was imprisoned by his mother Marguerite of Foix when, during the Italian Wars, he sided for Emperor Charles V (the marquesses of Saluzzo were traditional allied/subjects of the Kings of France). In 1528 he was freed by a popular insurrection, and elected as Marquess in lieu of his brother, Michele Antonio, who had died in battle.

One year later however, Francis I of France deposed him, replacing him with his brother Francesco. Giovanni Ludovico subsequently tried to recover his rule in Saluzzo with the Emperor's help, however he was unsuccessful. As such the marquisate entered the control of the French monarchy.

Preceded by Michele Antonio	Marquess of Saluzzo; 1528–1529	Succeeded by Francesco
