= Ludovico II of Saluzzo =

Marquess of Saluzzo (1438–1504)

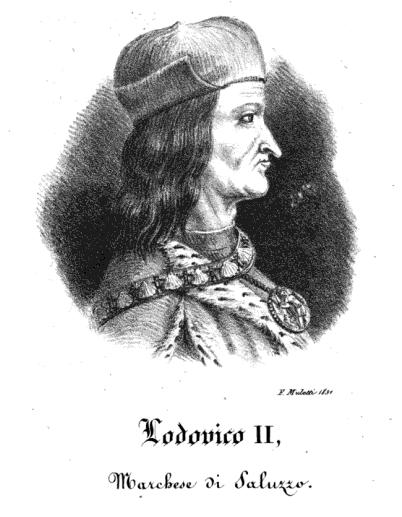
Ludovico II del Vasto

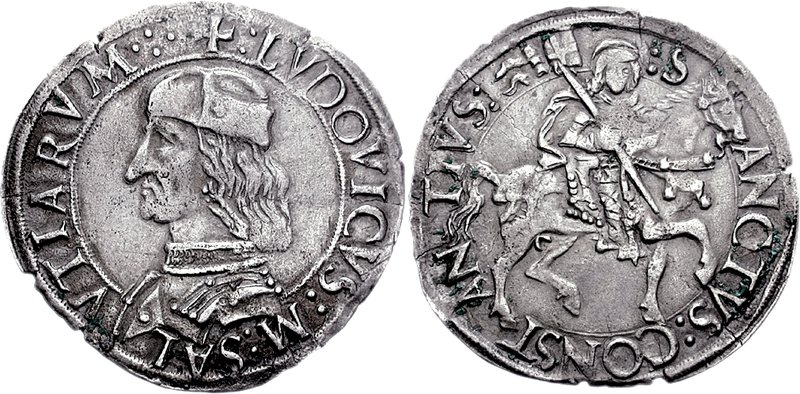
A cavallotto of Ludovico II of Saluzzo (1475). Caption: LVDOVICVS M. SALVTIARVM / SANCTVS CONSTANTIVS.

Ludovico II del Vasto (23 March 1438 in Saluzzo – 27 January 1504) was marquess of Saluzzo from 1475 until his death. Before his accession as marquis he held the title of Count of Carmagnola.

== Biography ==
Ludovico was the son of Ludovico I of Saluzzo and Isabella of Montferrat. He continued his father's war against Charles I, Duke of Savoy, which had depleted Saluzzo's fortunes, but again without notable results. Following his father's death in April 1475, Ludovico became marquess of Saluzzo. In an effort to foster trade, he patronized the construction of an alpine tunnel under Monviso which was completed in 1480.

In 1481, Ludovico married his cousin, Giovanna of Montferrat, daughter of Marquess William VIII of Montferrat and Marie de Foix. Later he married Margaret of Foix-Candale in 1492.

Worsening relations with duke Charles of Savoy hastened Ludovico's allegiance to the French king Charles VIII. In 1487, Ludovico asked Charles for an army to relieve the siege of Saluzzo, but the city fell to Louis Tailland on 3 April 1487. Ludovico fled to Provence and remained in exile until 1490.

In 1499, Ludovico was with the French forces of Louis XII that invaded the Duchy of Milan. Following the French loss of Naples, Ludovico was sent to Gaeta and reinforced the city upon his arrival. Francesco II Gonzaga, Marquis of Mantua, leading a French army to Gaeta, resigned his command to Ludovico. Ludovico encamped his army across from the Spanish separated by the Garigliano river. The Spanish, with the building of a pontoon bridge, were able to launch a surprise attack on Ludovico's army and defeated it at the Battle of Garigliano in 1503.

Ludovico died in Genoa in January 1504 and was succeeded by his and Marguerite's eldest child, Michele Antonio I of Saluzzo.

A monument to him is located in the church of San Giovanni at Saluzzo, commissioned by his wife Margaret and executed by Benedetto Briosco in 1508. Ludovico II was also the initiator of the Neo-Gothic Cathedral of Saluzzo and of the first Alpine tunnel, the Buco di Viso (2,880 metres above sea level).

== Issue ==
Ludovico and Giovanna had:

- Margherita (born in 1486). She was betrothed twice: first, on 27 July 1490, to Antonio Maria Sanseverino, and then in 1496 to Claudio Giacomo of Miolans (died in 1497). Finally, in 1515 she married the Spanish nobleman Pietro of Salvatierra (died 1524), with whom she had a son, Atanasio López of Herrera and Saluzzo.
- Stillbirth son (29 December 1489).

Ludovico and Margaret had:

- Michele Antonio (1495–1528)
- Gian Ludovico (1496–1529, d. 1563), deposed
- Francesco Ludovico I (1498–1537)
- Adriano (1499–1501)
- Gian Gabriele (1501–1548)

== Sources ==
- Day, William R.; Matzke, Michael; Saccocci, Andrea (2020). Medieval European Coinage. Vol. 12, Northern Italy. Cambridge University Press.
- Mallett, Michael; Shaw, Christine (2012). The Italian Wars, 1494–1559. Pearson Educational.
- Tavuzzi, Michael (2007). Renaissance Inquisitors: Dominican Inquisitors and Inquisitorial Districts in Northern Italy, 1474–1527. Brill.

Preceded by Ludovico I	Marquess of Saluzzo; 1475–1504	Succeeded by Michele Antonio
