= Castelnau-de-Médoc =

- Commune
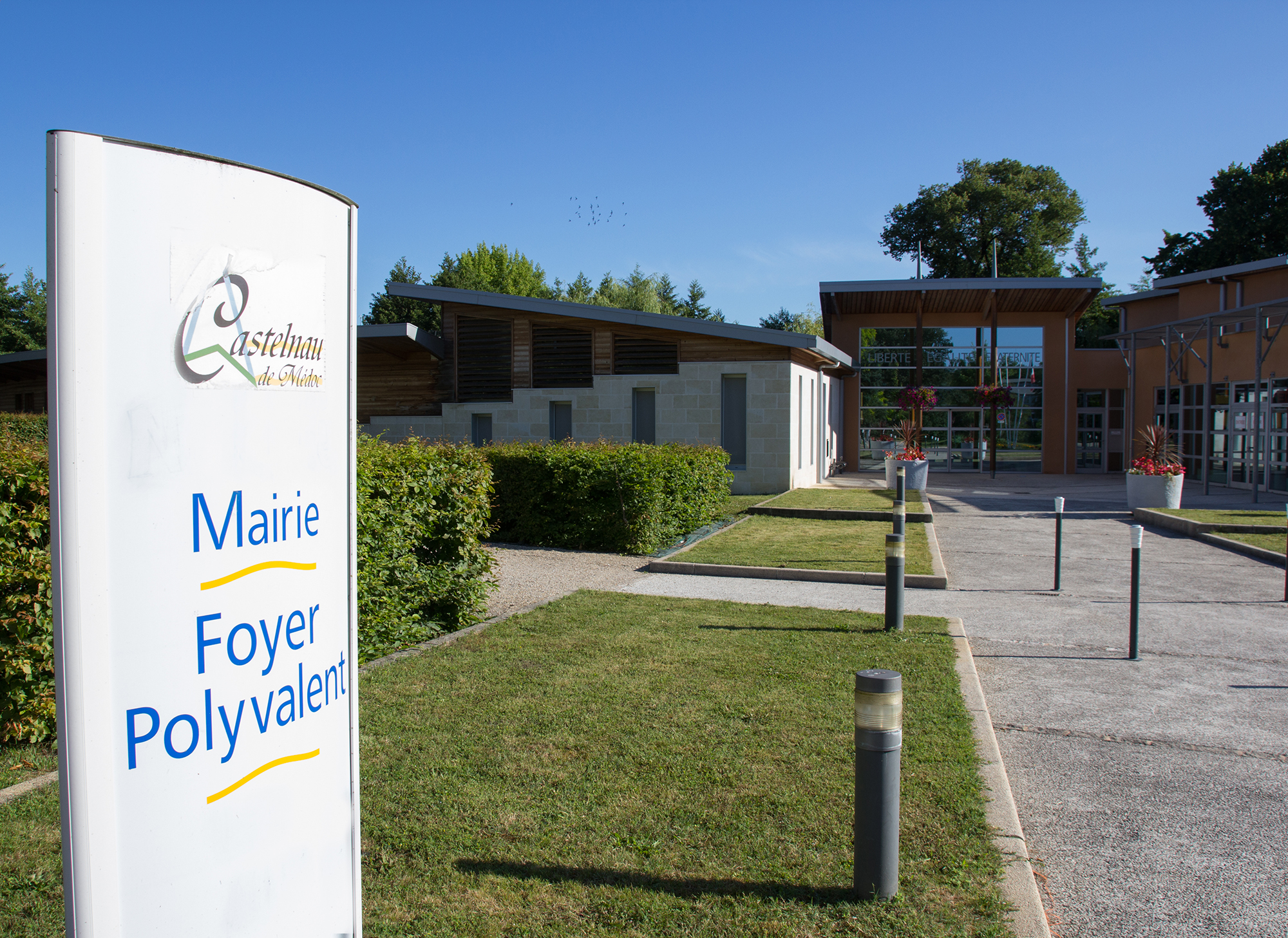
- Town hall

- Coat of arms
- Location of Castelnau-de-Médoc
- Location within France Location within Nouvelle-Aquitaine
- Coordinates: 45°01′41″N 0°47′53″W
- Country: France
- Region: Nouvelle-Aquitaine
- Department: Gironde
- Arrondissement: Lesparre-Médoc
- Canton: Le Sud-Médoc
- Intercommunality: Médulienne

Government
  - Mayor (2020–2026): Eric Arrigoni
- Area^{1}: 23.92 km^{2} (9.24 sq mi)
- Elevation: 75 m (246 ft)
- Highest elevation: 47 m (154 ft)
- Lowest elevation: 14 m (46 ft)
- Population (2023): 4,907
  - Density: 205.1/km^{2} (531.3/sq mi)
- Time zone: UTC+01:00 (CET)
  - Summer (DST): UTC+02:00 (CEST)
- INSEE/Postal code: 33104 /33480
- ^{1} French Land Register data, which excludes lakes, ponds, glaciers > 1 km^{2} (0.386 sq mi or 247 acres) and river estuaries.

Castelnau-de-Médoc (French pronunciation: [kastɛlno də medɔk]; Occitan: Castèthnau de Medòc) is a commune in the Gironde department, Nouvelle-Aquitaine, southwestern France.

== Population ==
Historical population
Year	Pop.	±% p.a.
1968	1,573	—
1975	2,148	+4.55%
1982	2,621	+2.88%
1990	2,773	+0.71%
1999	3,165	+1.48%
2007	3,783	+2.25%
2012	3,935	+0.79%
2017	4,778	+3.96%
2023	4,907	+0.44%
Source: INSEE

== See also ==
- Communes of the Gironde department
