= Kutzenhausen =

Kutzenhausen may refer to:

- Kutzenhausen, Bas-Rhin
- Kutzenhausen, Bavaria
