= Seltzbach =

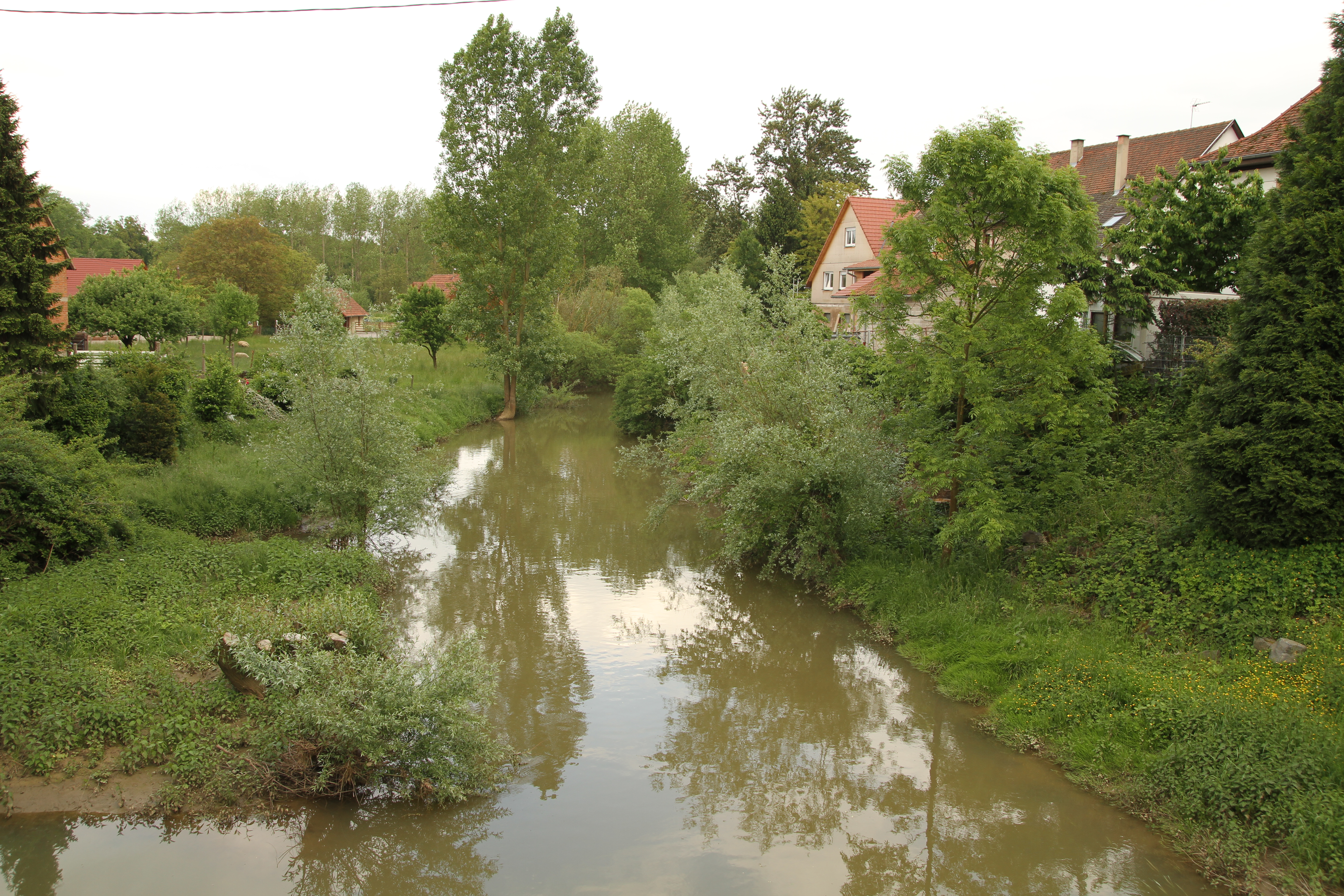

- Location within France Location within Grand Est

Location
- Country: France
- Region: Grand Est
- Department: Bas-Rhin
- Reference no.: FR: "A37-0200" (in French). Sandre.

Physical characteristics
- Source
  - location: Northeast of Mitschdorf in the North Vosges
  - coordinates: 48°57′54″N 7°47′26″E
  - elevation: ca. 325 m
- Mouth
  - location: Near Seltz into the Sauer
  - coordinates: 48°53′30″N 8°06′40″E
  - elevation: ca. 109 m
- Length: 33.1 km
- Basin size: 219.7 km^{2} (84.8 sq mi)
- Discharge
  - location: mouth
  - average: 1.8 m^{3}/s (64 cu ft/s)

Basin features
- Progression: Sauer→ Rhine→ North Sea

The Seltzbach is a river that is 33 kilometres long. It forms a left tributary of the Sauer in Alsace.

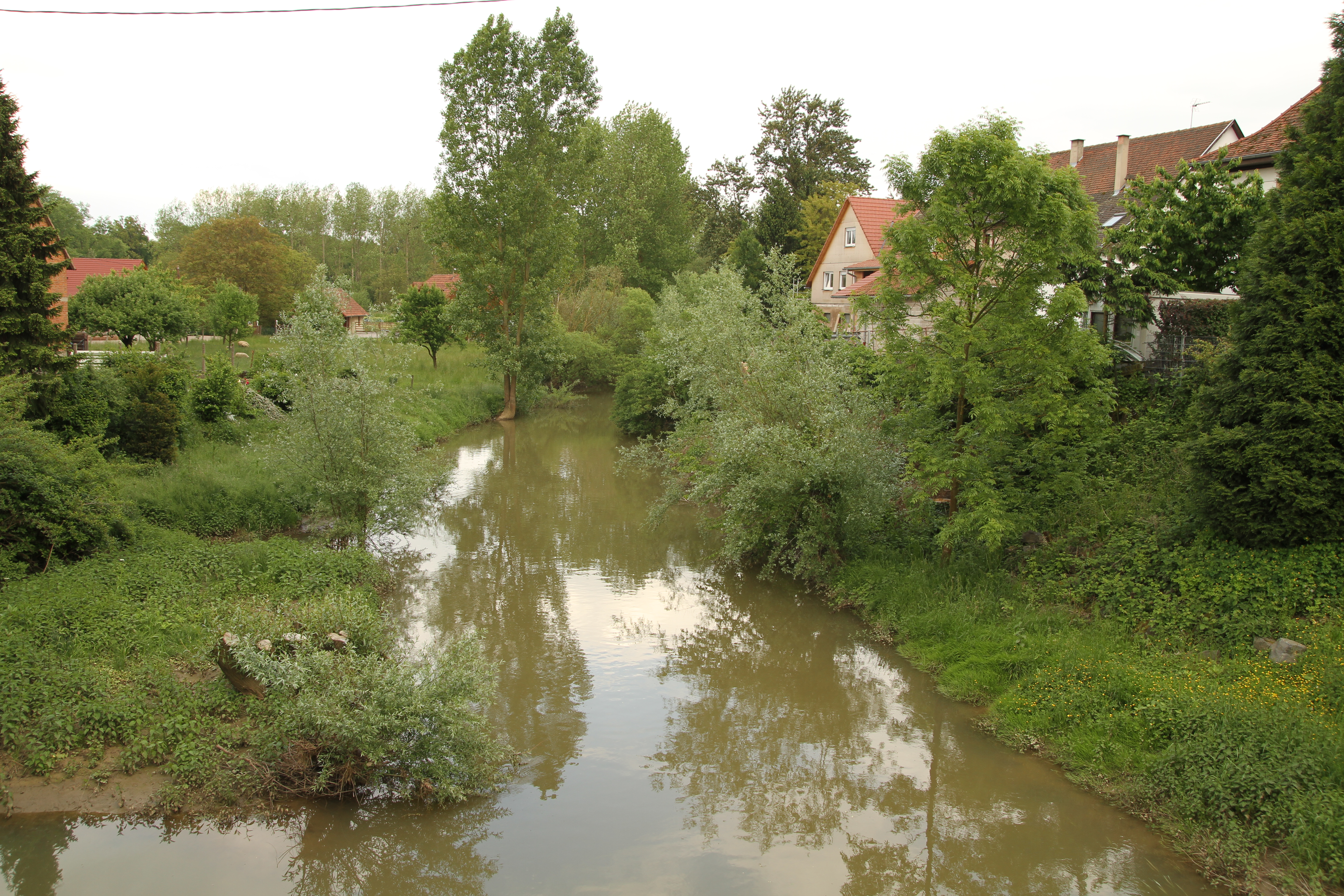
The Seltzbach near Seltz

== Geography ==
=== Course ===
The Seltzbach rises at a height of about 325 m in the Forêt de Gœrsdorf northeast of Mitschdorf in the North Vosges It initially flows for about 700 metres through woods in a southerly direction. Thereafter its course runs along the boundary between the municipalities of Mitschdorf and Lampertsloch, past the fields and meadows of the field system known as In der Heimelsstraengen to its right and the woods of Liebwald to its left. The river is now heding south-southwest. Near the mill of Brehmmühle southeast of Mitschdorf and north of the Rue de Voyageurs (D677) it bends sharply, almost at right angles, to bear east-southeast. This now becomes its main direction of flow from here to its mouth.

It now reaches the western edge of Preuschdorf and its volume is increased by the arrival of a headstream from the left, from the Liebwald to the north. Somewhat later it is joined by a stream on the right from the hill of Kalmersberg, which on many maps is also seen as the main headstream of the same name. East of the village it is fed from the right by the Kinderlochgraben, which comes from the southwest. Its course is now accompanied for a long stretch by the D28. It flows now through a landscape of fields and meadows. Just before it reaches Merkwiller-Péchelbronn, it picks up the waters of the Augraben from the left and, a little later, the Willenbachgraben on the right. After the Seltzersbach has left the village, it collects the Bruchgraben from the right, south of Wingertsfeld. The Seltzersbach now passes through the municipality of Kutzenhausen. At the spot where it is joined from the right by the Sumpfgraben, the Seltzersbach swings northeast and reaches Soultz-sous-Forêts-Wolfsgarten shortly thereafter.

It now changes direction to head west, flows through grassland and crosses under the Rue du Docteur Michel Deutsch (D264). Shortly afterwards on its left side its water volume it boosted by the Froeschwillerbach, also called the Froeschwillerbaechel. The Seltzersbach now passes under a railway of the SNCF and flows through more fields and meadows, passing under theD263 northeast of Hohwiller. It arrives in Hoffen where it crosses the D52 near the mill of Bostaetter Mühle. Near the sawmill (Saegmuehle), northeast of Leiterswiller, it collects Haussauerbach on the left. There the Eichelgraben ditch splits off and then, south of Oberroedern on its northern bank, the Eilgraben. The Seltzersbach passes under the D245 and is rejoined shortly thereafter by the Eichelgraben. Immediately afterwards another ditch branches of the Seltzersbach to the south. Southwest of Buhl the Eilgraben to the north rejoins the Seltzersbach. Soon afterwards the Seebach, also called the Seebaechel, empties into the river from the left. Near the mill of Gerittsmühle the Warsbach discharges into the Seltzersbach on the left, coming from the north. It now reaches Niederrœdern and is fed there by the Reissergraben from the right.

It leaves this village and snakes its way along the northern perimeter of the Hesselbusch woods, passes under the N363 and reaches the northern edge of Seltz, where it picks up the Eberbach from the left. It now flows between Seltz and Niedersand and empties at last into the Sauer at a height of 109 m.
