= Kutzenhausen, Bas-Rhin =

Kutzenhausen Kutzehüse
- Commune
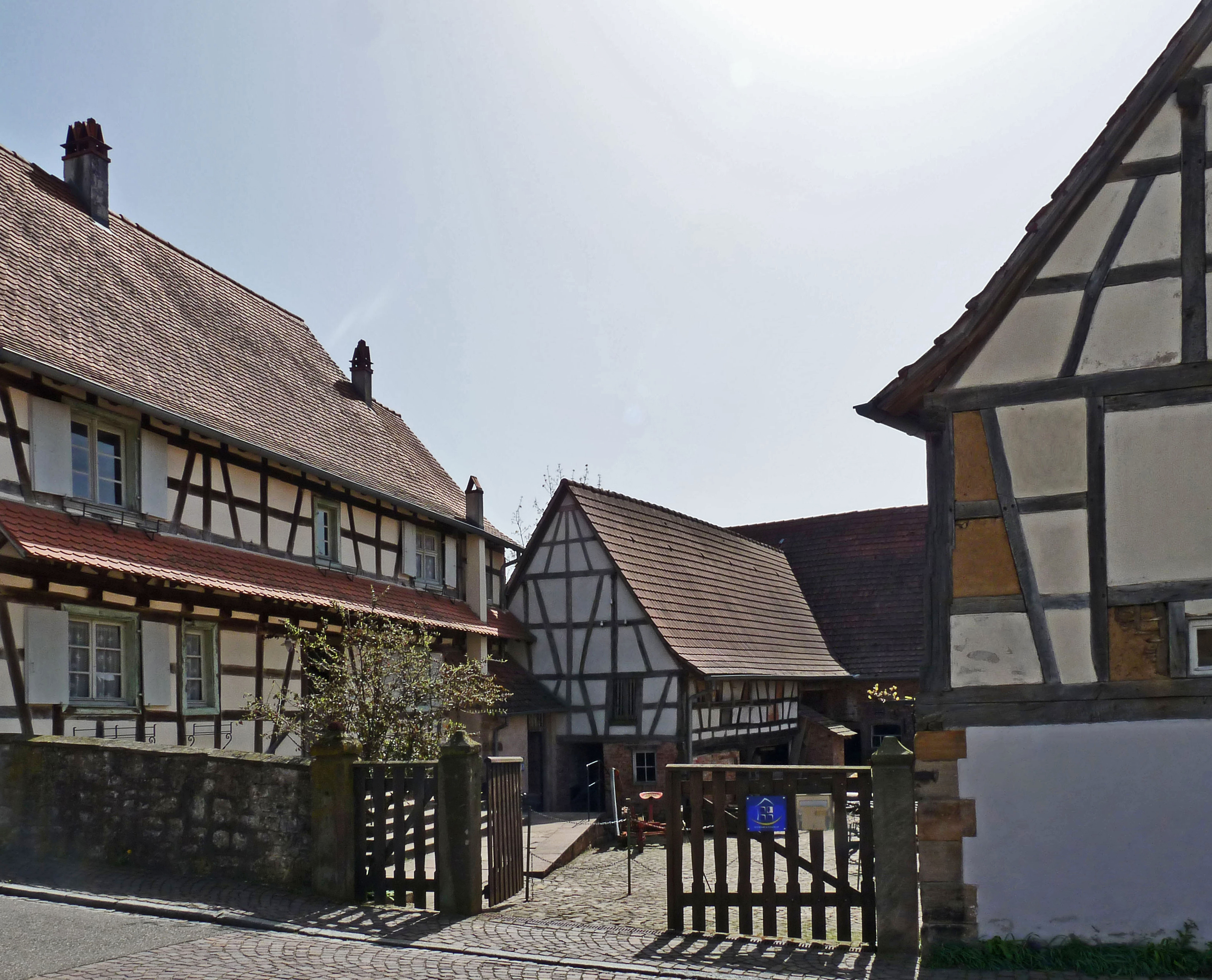
- The Maison Rurale de l'Outre-Forêt, an interpretation centre, in Kutzenhausen

- Coat of arms
- Location of Kutzenhausen
- Location within France Location within Grand Est
- Coordinates: 48°56′02″N 7°51′23″E
- Country: France
- Region: Grand Est
- Department: Bas-Rhin
- Arrondissement: Haguenau-Wissembourg
- Canton: Reichshoffen
- Intercommunality: Sauer-Pechelbronn Community of Communes

Government
  - Mayor (2026–32): Marc Florian
- Area^{1}: 7.20 km^{2} (2.78 sq mi)
- Highest elevation: 215 m (705 ft)
- Lowest elevation: 147 m (482 ft)
- Population (2023): 928
  - Density: 129/km^{2} (334/sq mi)
- Time zone: UTC+01:00 (CET)
  - Summer (DST): UTC+02:00 (CEST)
- INSEE/Postal code: 67254 /67250
- Website: www.kutzenhausen.fr/index.php/
- ^{1} French Land Register data, which excludes lakes, ponds, glaciers > 1 km^{2} (0.386 sq mi or 247 acres) and river estuaries.

Kutzenhausen is a commune in the Bas-Rhin department in Grand Est in north-eastern France.

Kutzenhausen lies 15 kilometres (9 mi) to the south of Wissembourg, but still within the Northern Vosges Regional Nature Park (French: Parc naturel régional des Vosges du Nord).This commune is located in the historic and cultural region of Alsace.

== Geography ==
=== Location ===
The commune is 2.3 km from Soulz-sous-Forêts, 2.6 from Merkwiller-Pechelbronn, 5.8 from Lobsann and 6.5 from Surbourg.

The locality is part of the Outre-Forêt nature reserve.

=== Geology and relief ===
Commune member of the Northern Vosges Regional Nature Park.

Geological formations in the commune present at outcrop or subsurface level.

High point: Grand Wintersberg.

=== Seismicity ===
The commune is located in a moderate seismicity zone.

=== Hydrography ===
The commune is located in the Rhine catchment area within the Rhine-Meuse basin. It is drained by the Seltzbach stream, the Froeschwillerbach stream and the Sumpfgraben stream.

The Seltzbach, which is 33 km long, rises in the commune of Gœrsdorf and flows into the Sauer at Seltz, after passing through 14 communes.

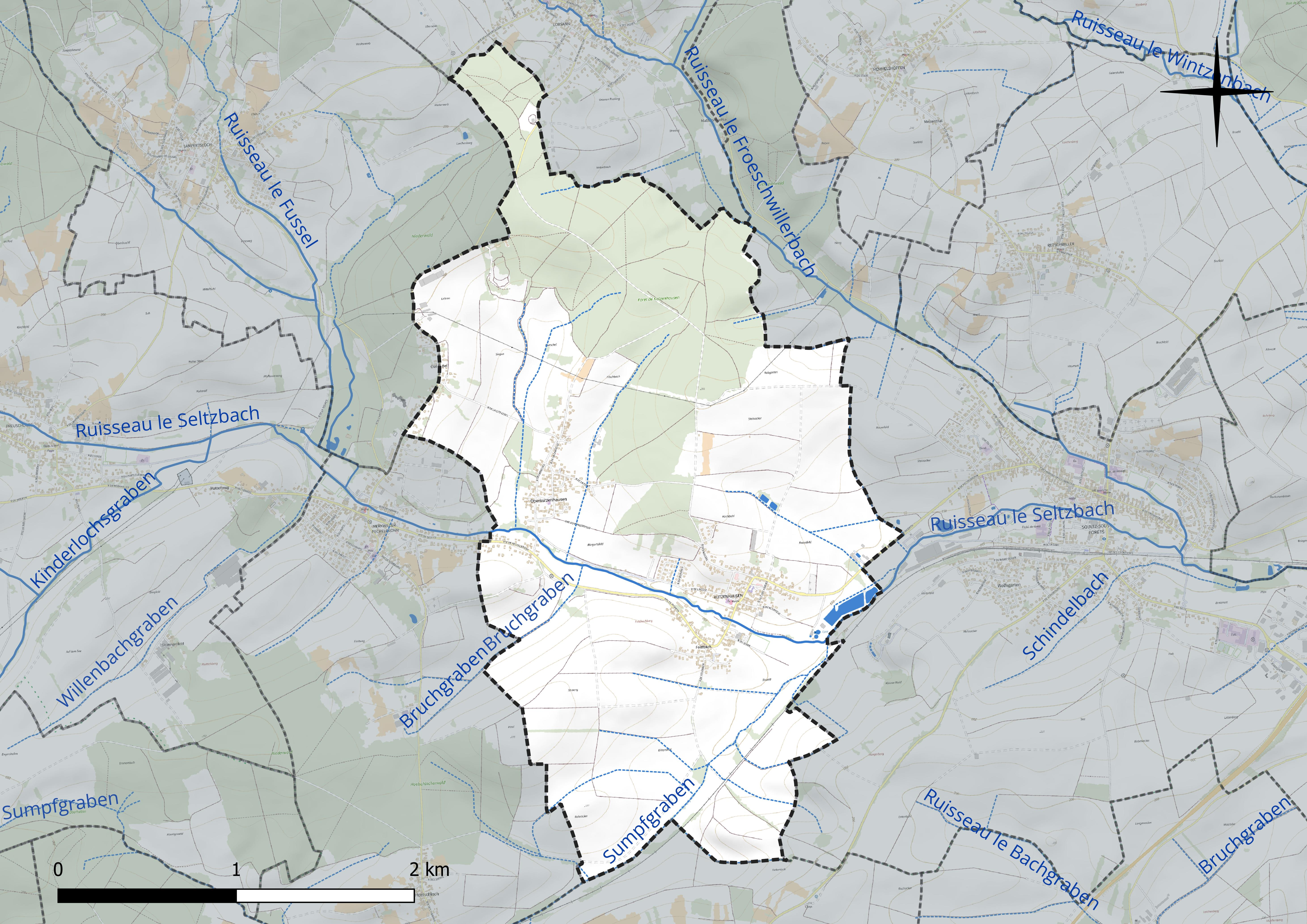
River system in Kutzenhausen. (Note: Intermittent streams are shown as dotted lines.)

=== Climate ===
In 2010, the commune's climate was classified as that of the Montargnard margins, according to a study by the French National Centre for Scientific Research, based on a series of data covering the period 1971–2000. In 2020, Météo-France published a typology of climates in mainland France in which the commune is exposed to a semi-continental climate and is in a transition zone between the ‘Vosges’ and ‘Alsace’ climatic regions.

For the period 1971–2000, the average annual temperature was 10.6 °C, with an annual temperature range of 17.8 °C. The average cumulative annual rainfall is 820 mm, with 10.6 days of precipitation in January and 10.2 days in July. For the period 1991–2020, the average annual temperature recorded at the nearest Météo-France weather station, in the commune of Preuschdorf, 4 km away, was 11.3 °C, and the average annual total rainfall was 834.2 mm. The maximum temperature recorded at this station was 39.8 °C, reached on 4 July 2015; the minimum temperature was -19.9 °C, reached on 8 January 1985.

The commune's climate parameters have been estimated for the middle of the century (2041–2070) according to different greenhouse gas emission scenarios based on the new DRIAS-2020 reference climate projections. They can be consulted on a dedicated website published by Météo-France in November 2022.

=== Communications and transport ===
==== Roads ====
Situated between Soultz-sous-Forêts and Merkwiller-Pechelbronn, it is crossed by the D 28 departmental road.

- D 52 towards Soultz-sous-Forêts.
- D 28 towards Merkwiller-Pechelbronn, Dieffenbach-lès-Woerth.

==== Public transport ====
- Transport in Alsace.
- Fluo Grand Est.

==== SNCF ====
- Soultz-sous-Forêts station,
- Hoelschloch station,
- Hoffen station,
- Walbourg station,
- Hunspach station.

==== Neighbouring communes ====
- Lobsann (North)
- Soultz-sous-Forêts (East)
- Surbourg (South)
- Merkwiller-Pechelbronn (South West)
- Lampertsloch (North West)

=== Intercommunality ===
Commune member of the Sauer-Pechelbronn community of communes.

== Town planning ==
=== Typology ===
As of 1 January 2024, Kutzenhausen is classified as a rural town, according to the new seven-level communal density grid defined by INSEE in 2022. It is located outside an urban unit. The commune is also part of the Haguenau catchment area, of which it is an outlying commune. This area, which includes 34 communes, is categorised as having between 50,000 and less than 200,000 inhabitants.

=== Land use ===
The commune's land use, as revealed by the European biophysical land cover database Corine Land Cover (CLC), is characterised by the importance of agricultural land (67.7% in 2018), a proportion roughly equivalent to that of 1990 (68.5%). The detailed breakdown in 2018 is as follows: arable land (56.3%), forests (23.7%), urbanised areas (8.7%), grassland (6.3%), permanent crops (5%). The evolution of land use in the commune and its infrastructure can be seen on the various cartographic representations of the area: the Cassini map (18th century), the staff map (1820–1866) and the IGN maps or aerial photos for the current period (1950 to the present).

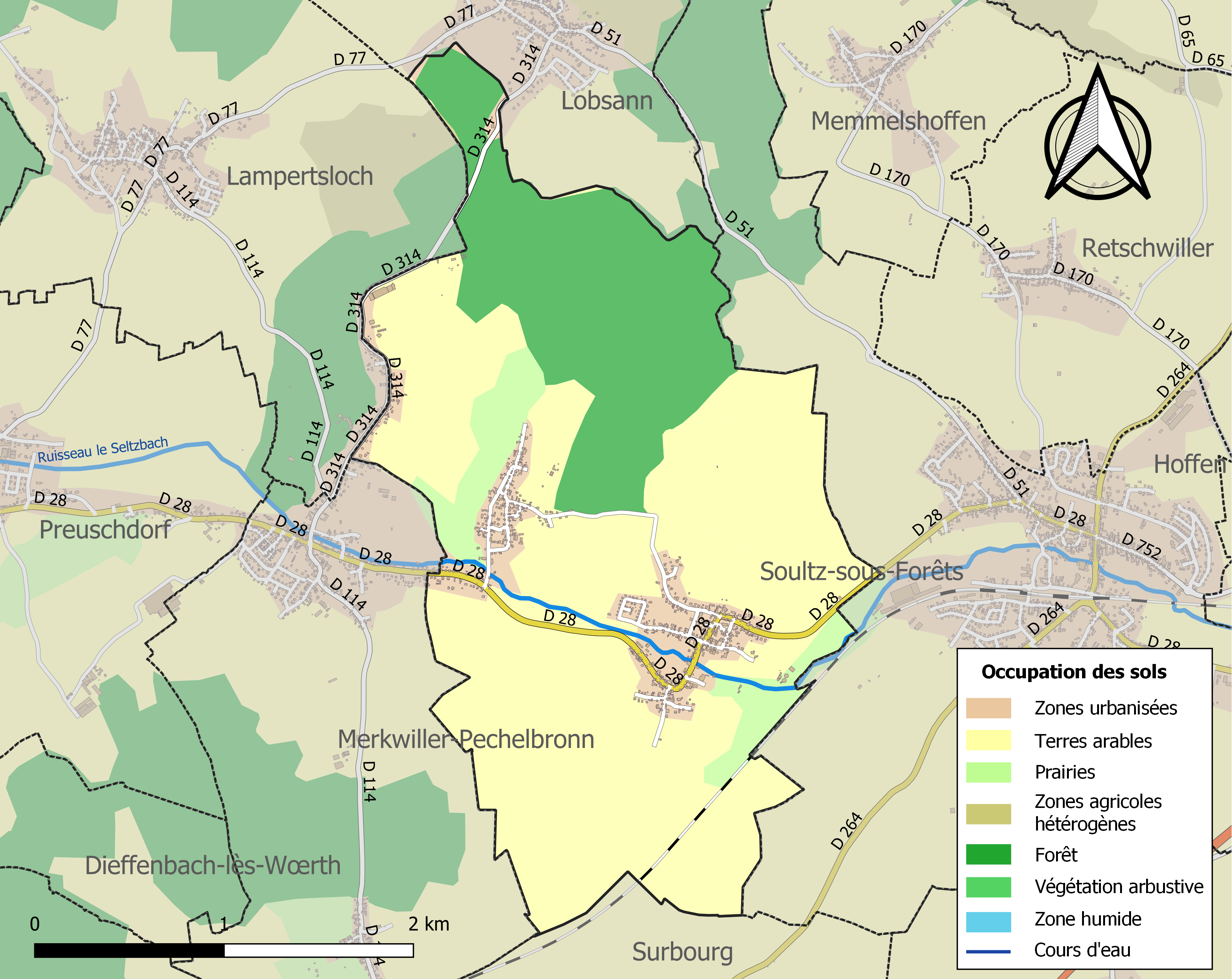
Map of infrastructure and land use in the commune in 2018 (Corine Land Cover).

Commune covered by the Pechelbronn inter-municipal local planning scheme.

== Toponymy ==
From Goten hause, a possession of the nearby abbey of Wissembourg; another Kutzenhausen was located near Drusenheim and probably owes its name to the former abbey of Arnulfsau. In the past, the abbeys were also called Goten hause, an old form spelt Chuzichusi.

== History ==
The municipality of Kutzenhausen originated from a former bailiwick (Note: In 1789, during the French Revolution, the bailiwick was converted to a commune.) and, at the beginning of the 19th century, included the towns of Niederkutzenhausen and Feldbach (now the village of Kutzenhausen), Oberkutzenhausen, Merkwiller and Hoelschloch. In 1888, these two districts formed the new commune of Merkwiller consisting of Merkwiller and Hoelschloch. Oberkutzenhausen was its own commune until the early 1790s. On 1 January 2015, Kutzenhausen was transferred from the arrondissement of Wissembourg to the arrondissement of Haguenau-Wissembourg.

In France, the first oil wells (mainly oil sands) were sunk in Kutzenhausen. Oil production, together with a refinery, continued until the 1970s.

=== Heraldry ===
Coat of arms	Quarterly: First quarter: A gold field with a black saltire; Second quarter: A green field with a gold sheaf of wheat; Third quarter: A green field with three silver bars; Fourth quarter: A black field with a gold ploughshare positioned diagonally (bend sinister) with the point facing upward
Details	

== Politics and administration ==
=== List of mayors ===
==== From 1797 to 1888 (including Merkwiller and Hoelschloch) ====
Name (Birth–Death)	Term of office		Time in office	Political Party	Notes
Name (Birth–Death)	Start	End	Time in office	Political Party	Notes
Jean Georges Eyer	4 April 1797	1797	Less than a year	Independent	
Jean Michel Pfitzinger (1763–1825)	18 September 1797	30 March 1798	193 days	Independent	Interim mayor
Chrétien Weiss (1756/1757–1843)	30 March 1798	1808	10 years	Independent	
Jacques Wolff (1762–1831)	1808	1830	22 years	Independent	
Chrétien Pfitzinger (1781/1782–1847)	1830	1831	1 year	Independent	
Michel Hey (1783–1853)	1831	1852	21 years	Independent	
Antoine Haller (1797–1877)	1852	1855	3 years	Independent	
Georges Pfitzinger (1811–1882)	1855	1860	5 years	Independent	
Jacques Wolff (1806–1870)	1860	11 October 1870	10 years	Independent	Died in office
Frédéric Roessel (1825–1894)	1870	1888	18 years	Independent	

==== 1888–present (current territory) ====
Portrait	Name (Birth–Death)	Term of office		Time in office	Political Party	Notes
Portrait	Name (Birth–Death)	Start	End	Time in office	Political Party	Notes
	Frédéric Roessel (1825–1894)	1888	5 septembre 1894	6 years	Independent	Died in office
	Georges Wagner (1854–1923)	1894 or 1895	1906	11 years	Independent	
	Georges Strohl (1849–1918)	1906	1917	11 years	Independent	
	Georges Mall (1859–1939)	1917	1924	7 years	Independent	
	Georges Mall (1891–1965)	1924	1944	20 years	Independent	
	Joseph Klein (1912–1976)	1945	1945	Less than a year	Independent	
	Martin Heintz (1901–1983)	1946	March 1971	25 years	Independent	
	Georges Wagner (1920–2006)	March 1971	March 1989	18 years	Independent	
	Edmond Fabacher (b. 1944)	March 1989	28 March 2014	25 years	Independent	
	Pierrot Sitter (b. 1954)	28 March 2014	20 March 2026	11 years, 357 days	Independent	
	Marc Florian (b. 1963)	20 March 2026	Present	245 days	Independent	

=== List of First Deputy Mayors since 1977 ===
Portrait	Name (Birth–Death)	Term of office		Time in office	Political Party	Notes
Portrait	Name (Birth–Death)	Start	End	Time in office	Political Party	Notes
	Edmond Fabacher (b. 1944)	March 1977	March 1989	12 years	Independent	
	Armand Braconnier (b. 1942)	March 1989	2007	18 years	Independent	
	Pierrot Sitter (b. 1954)	2007	28 March 2014	7 years	Independent	
	Marie-Louise Roth (b. 1951)	28 March 2014	18 May 2020	6 years, 51 days	Independent	
	Philippe Mall (b. 1957)	18 May 2020	20 March 2026	5 years, 306 days	Independent	
	Serge Zeidler (b. 1964)	20 March 2026	Present	245 days	Independent	

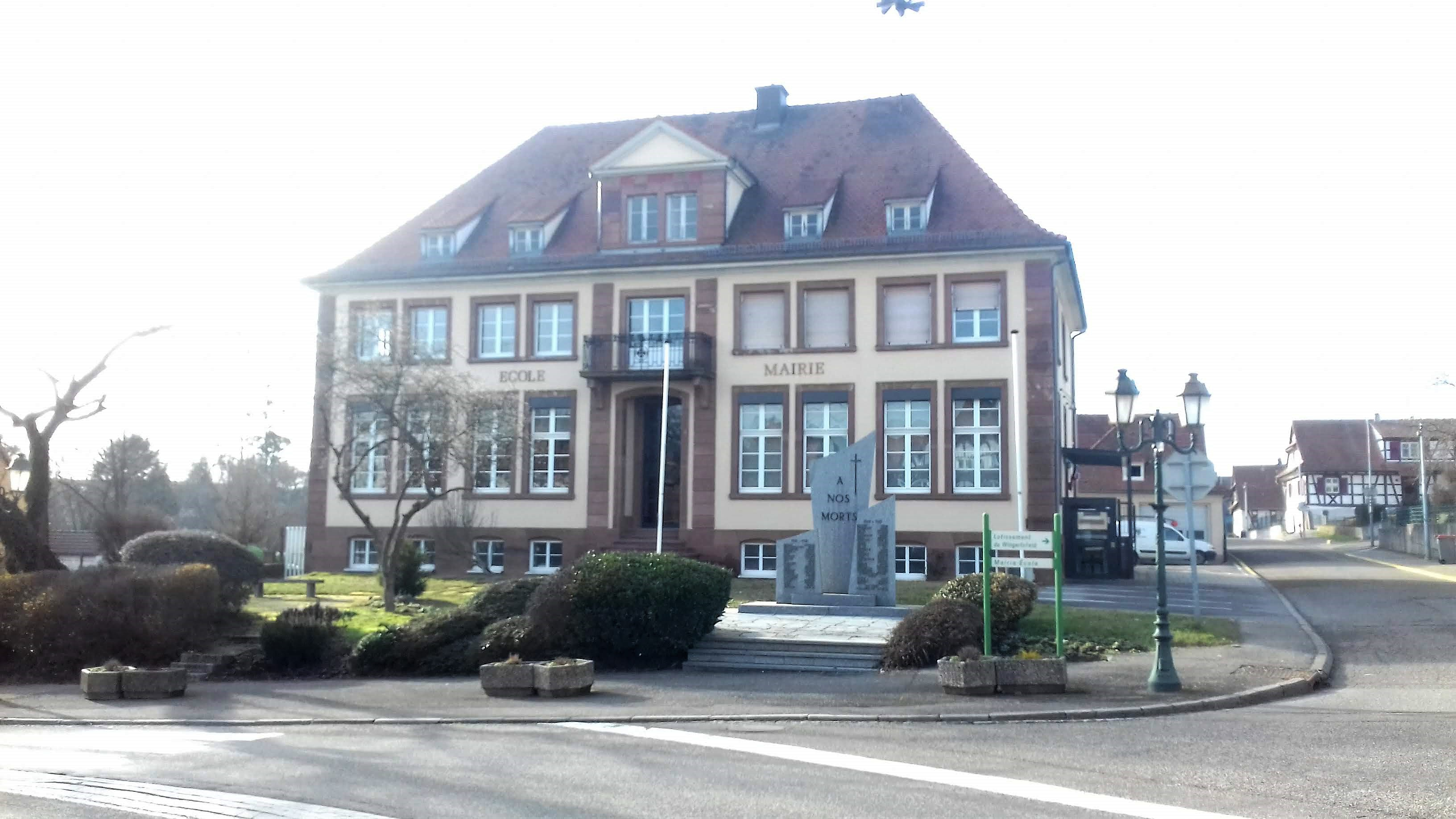
Town hall-school (Note: The town hall and the school are in the same building.) in Kutzenhausen.

=== Budget and taxation 2022 ===
In 2022, the commune's budget was made up as follows:

- Total operating income: €596,000, i.e. €642 per inhabitant;
- Total operating expenses: €441,000, i.e. €475 per inhabitant;
- Total investment resources: €727,000, i.e. €783 per inhabitant;
- Total investment expenditure: €625,000, i.e. €672 per capita;
- Debt: €684,000, i.e. €736 per capita.

With the following tax rates:

- Council tax: 8.50%;
- Property tax on built-up properties: 25.67%;
- Property tax on non-built-up properties: 48.00%;
- Additional tax on non-built property: 0%;
- Business property tax: 0%.

Key figures Household income and poverty in 2020: median disposable income per consumption unit in 2020: €25,020.

== Economy ==
=== Business and commerce ===
==== Agriculture ====
- Growing cereals, pulses and oilseeds.
- Associated crop and livestock farming.

==== Tourism ====
- Traditional restaurants.
- Restaurants and accommodation in Merkwiller-Pechelbronn, Soultz-sous-Forêts.

==== Shops ====
- Shops and services in Soultz-sous-Forêts.

== Population ==
=== Demographics ===
Year	Population	Evolution
1793	997	N/A
1800	1,156	▲159
1806	1,310	▲154
1821	1,444	▲134
1831	1,559	▲115
1836	1,487	▼72
1841	1,370	▼117
1846	1,391	▲21
1851	1,297	▼94
1856	1,063	▼234
1861	1,040	▼23
1866	1,038	▼2
1871	1,050	▲12
1875	1,049	▼1
1880	1,013	▼36
1885	1,062	▲49
1890	692	▼370
1895	730	▲38
1900	722	▼8
1905	754	▲32
1910	752	▼2
1921	756	▲4
1926	828	▲72
1931	922	▲94
1936	965	▲33
1946	958	▼7
1954	823	▼135
1962	806	▼17
1968	785	▼21
1975	719	▼66
1982	713	▼6
1990	740	▲27
1999	783	▲43
2006	830	▲47
2007	837	▲7
2008	874	▲37
2009	909	▲35
2010	906	▼3
2011	902	▼4
2012	899	▼3
2013	904	▲5
2014	927	▲23
2015	923	▼4
2016	919	▼4
2017	915	▼4
2018	912	▼3
2019	913	▲1
2020	917	▲4
2021	921	▲4
2022	924	▲3
2023	928	▲4

=== Education ===
Educational establishments :

- Primary school.
- Nursery school.

=== Health ===
Health professionals and establishments:

- Doctors in Merkwiller-Pechelbronn, Surbourg, Soultz-sous-Forêts, Goersdorf, Durrenbach, Woerth;
- Pharmacies in Merkwiller-Pechelbronn, Soultz-sous-Forêts, Woerth, Lembach;
- Hospitals in Lobsann, Goersdorf, Wissembourg, Haguenau.

=== Worship ===
- Catholic worship, Les Prairies de la Zorn parish community, diocese of Strasbourg.
- Protestant worship.

=== Twin towns ===
- (Germany) Kutzenhausen, Bavaria since 31 May 1987.

== Places and monuments ==
=== Religious heritage ===
- Protestant church, rue de l'église, built between 1763 and 1765, used alternately by Protestants and Catholics until a Catholic church was built in 1905.
  - Great organ on gallery.
- Catholic church, rue des Acacias, built to plans by architect Bruno Steller between 1903 and 1905. Consecrated in 1905 by the bishop-coadjutor Zorn von Bulach, the patron saint of the church is St George.
  - Organ on gallery.
- Chapel Notre-Dame-de-la-Paix.
- The former synagogue. Destroyed in 1940 by the Hitler Youth, the youth wing of the Nazi party, it was destroyed in 1957 because it was in danger of collapsing.
- War memorial: conflicts commemorated: World War I – World War II – Algerian War.
- Calvary.
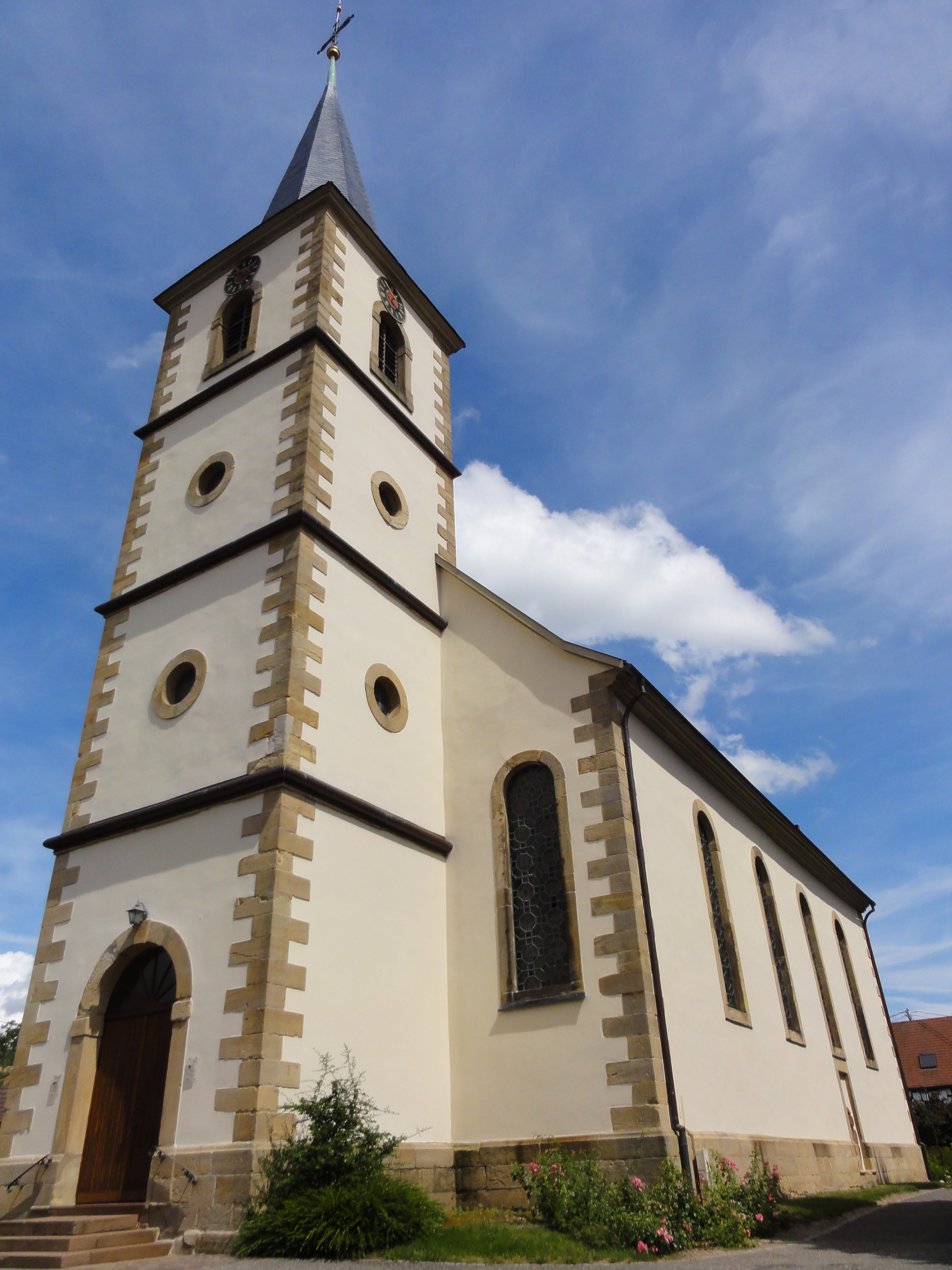
Protestant church (18th century)

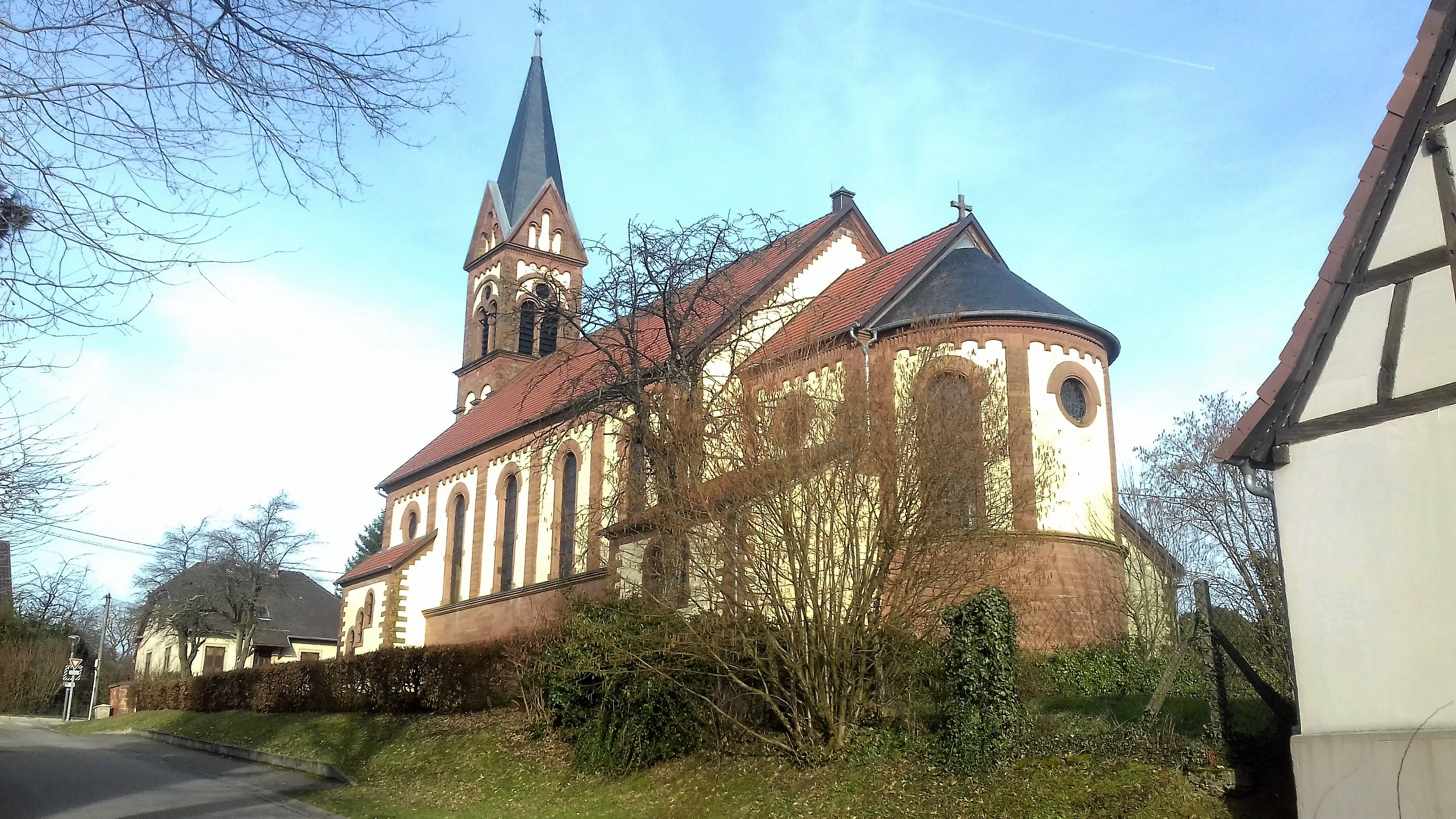
Saint George catholic church

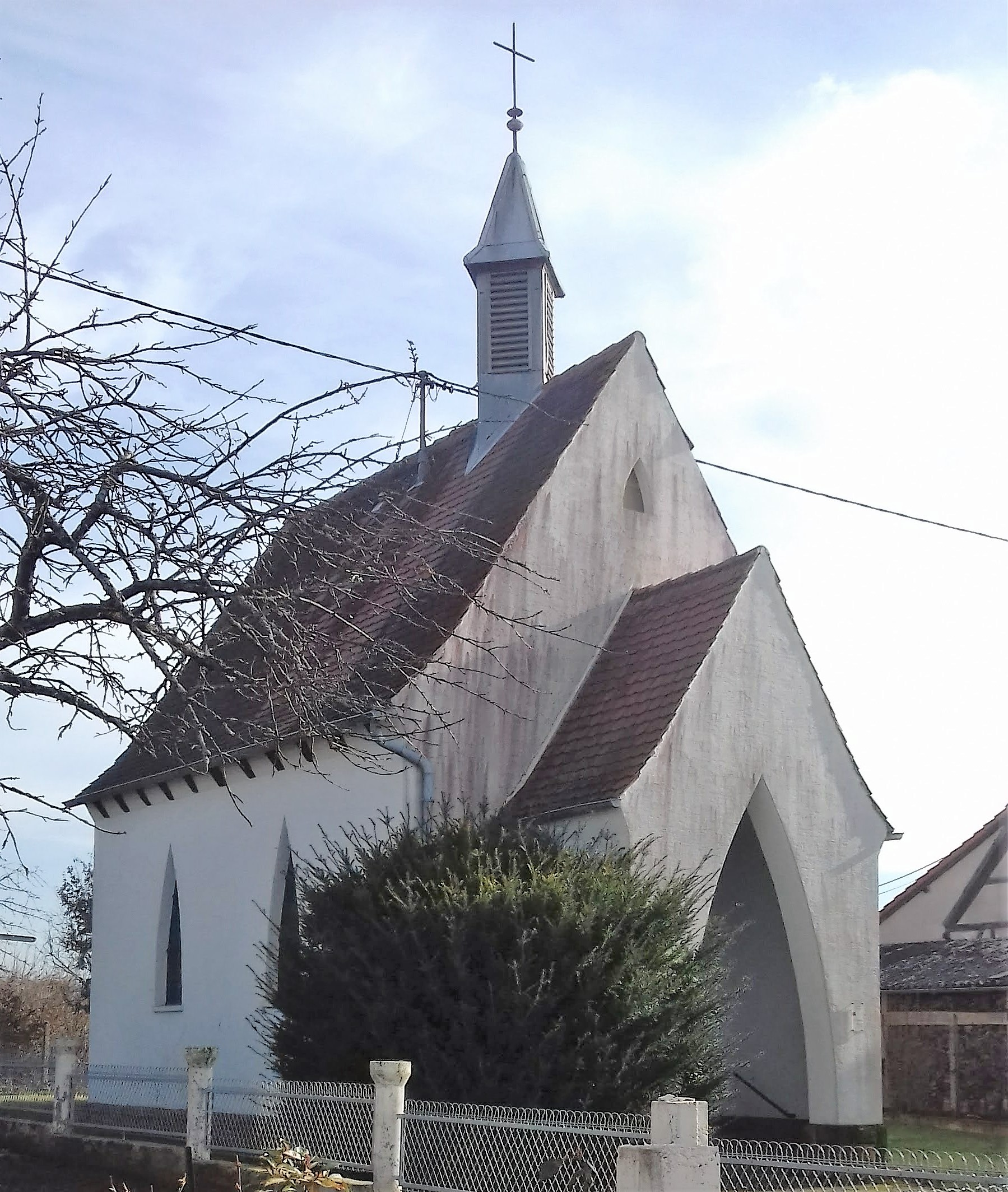
Notre-Dame-de-la-Paix chapel

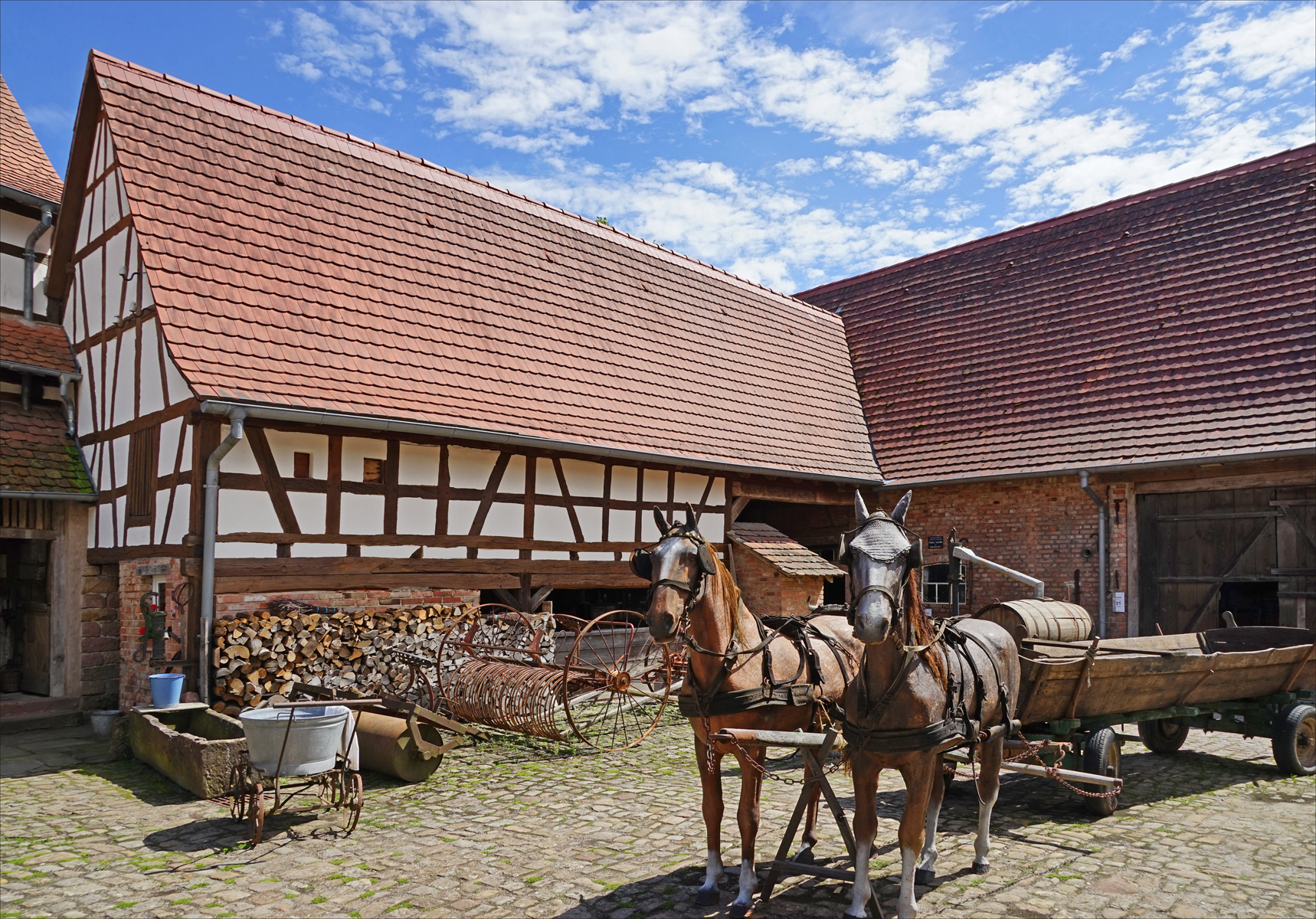
The Maison rurale de l’Outre-Forêt, now an interpretation centre of heritage

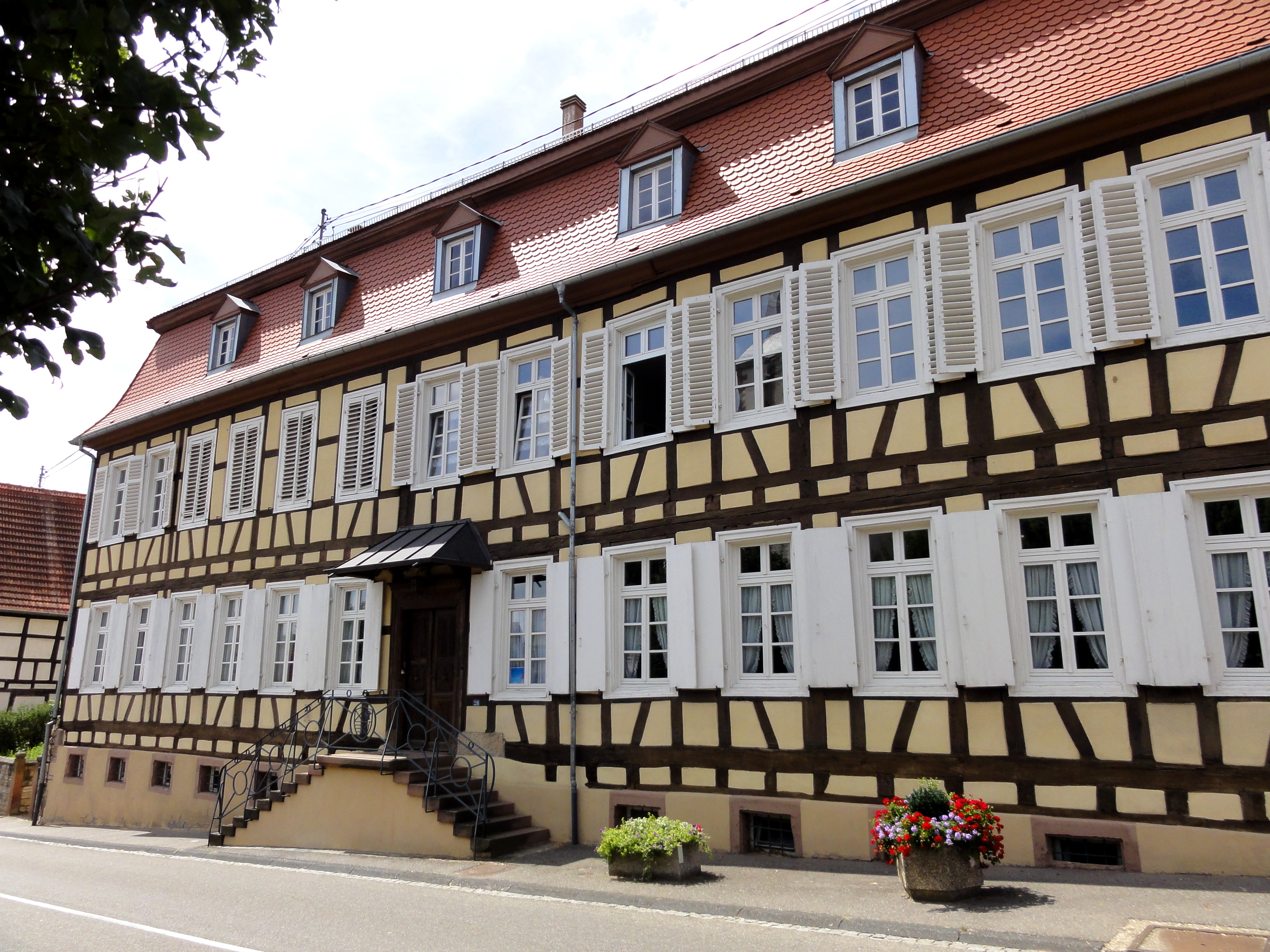
Former bailiwick of the Sires de Fleckenstein, former presbytery (18th century)

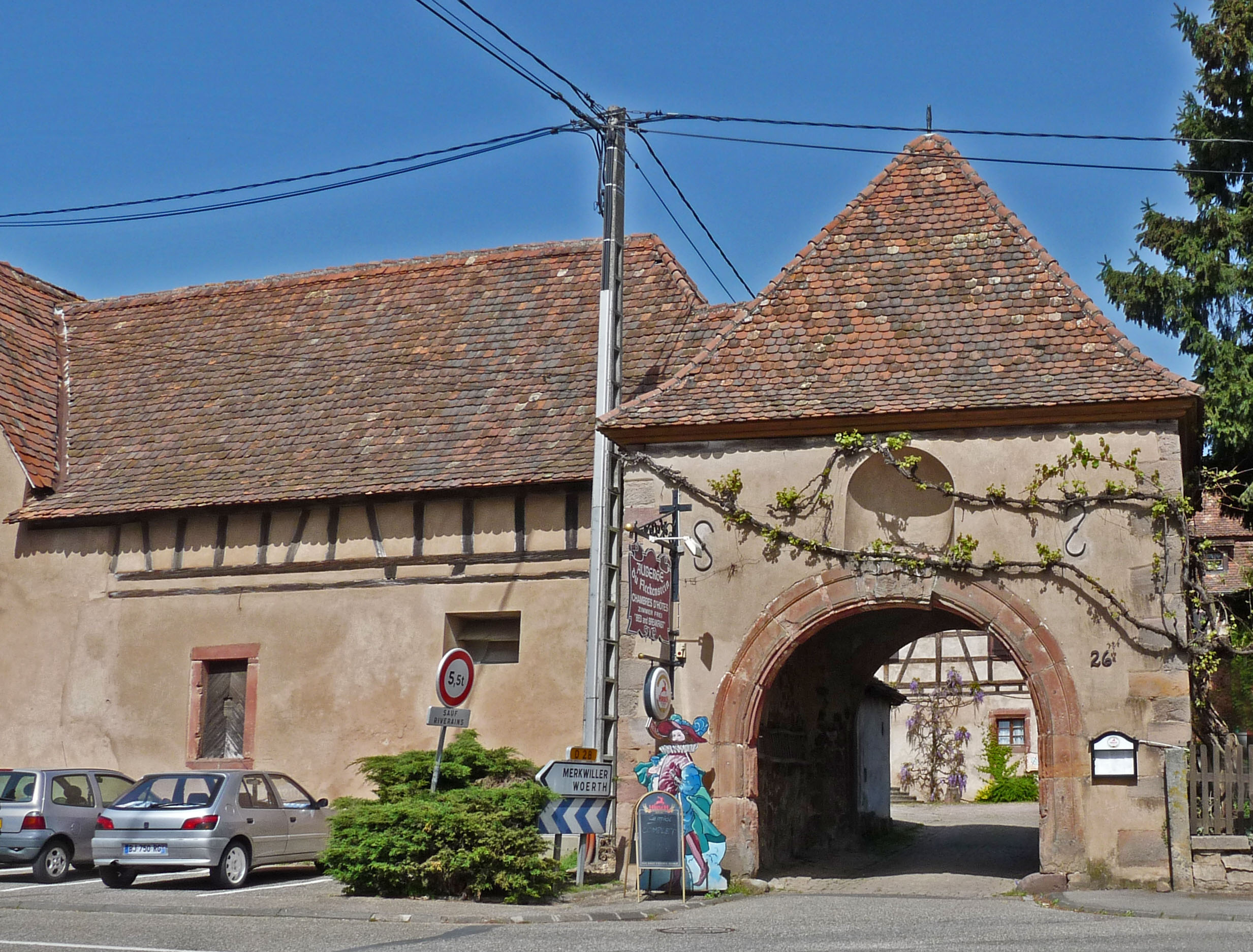
Remains of a former fortified farmhouse

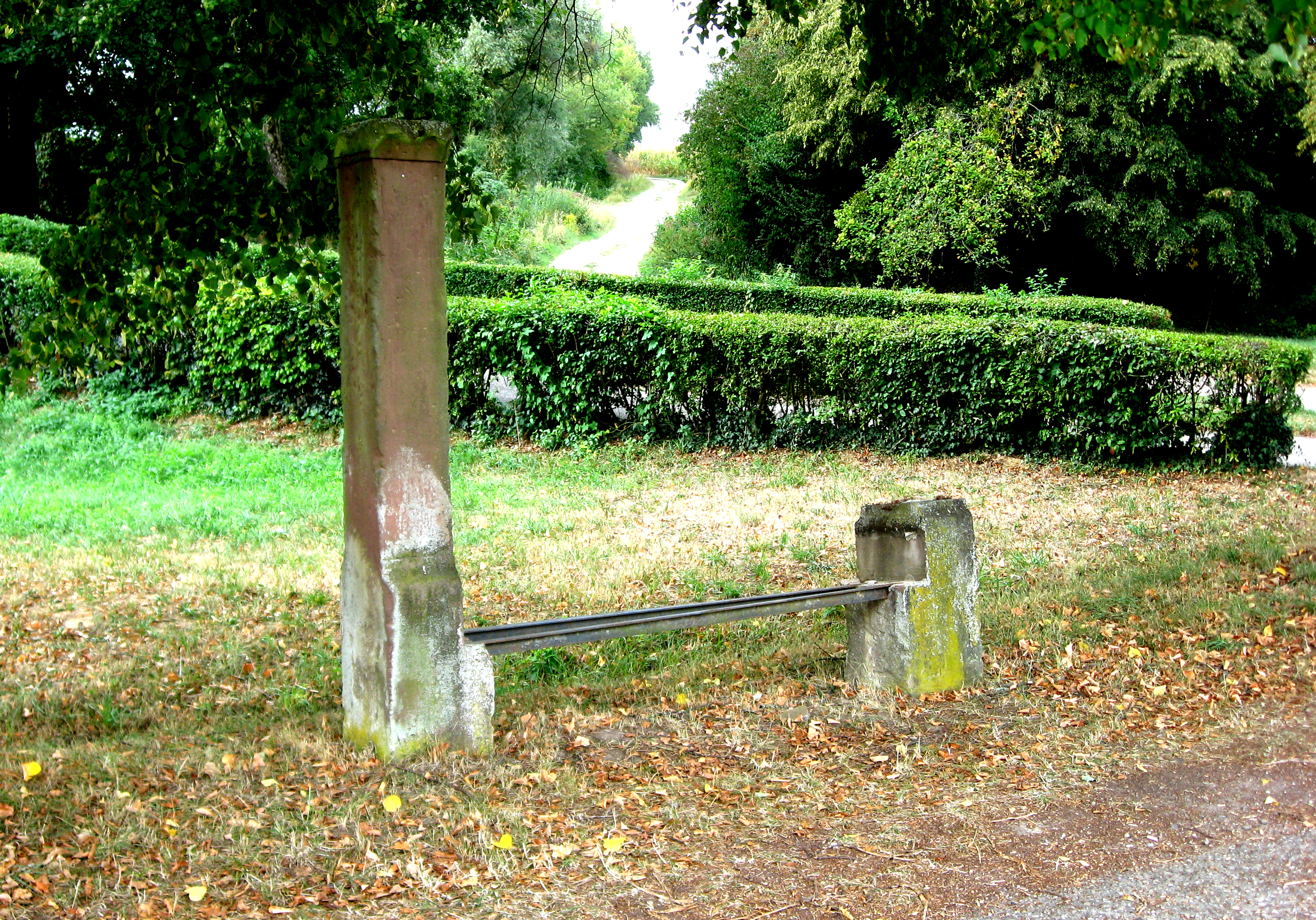
Ruins of a double-decker First Empire bench

=== Other heritage ===
- Mining remains, including a wooded slag heap.
- The commune is home to a museum of folk arts and traditions, the Maison rurale de l'Outre-Forêt, now a heritage interpretation centre.
- Porch tower at no. 26 route de Soultz.
- Bench known as the King of Rome bench.
- Well known as the pendulum well.

== Personalities linked to the town ==
- Annie Boulanger, former headmistress of the Kutzenhausen school, member of the Ordre des Palmes académiques, class of 1 January 2013.
- Edmond Fabacher, honorary mayor of Kutzenhausen, member of the Ordre des Palmes académiques, awarded on 1 January 2008.
- Barbe Roth, born 5 June 1924 (age 102 years, 168 days), oldest-living person in Kutzenhausen since Marguerite Wenner's death on 25 January 2020.

== Oldest living people in the town (90+) ==
Rank	Name	Age	Birth date	Sex
1	Barbe Roth (née Weimer)	102 years, 168 days	5 June 1924	F
2	Caroline Lang (née Durban)	98 years, 141 days	2 July 1928	F
3	Suzanne Stephan (née Erhart)	93 years, 93 days	19 August 1933	F
4	Marie Ratzel (née Zirnheld)	92 years, 65 days	16 September 1934	F
5	Joseph Heideyer	91 years, 291 days	2 February 1935	M
6	Christiane Moser	91 years, 183 days	21 May 1935	F
7	Bernadette Magnée (née Schweitzer)	90 years, 282 days	11 February 1936	F

== Chronological list of the oldest known living person in Kutzenhausen ==
From	Duration	Name	Sex	Age(s) when oldest	Lifespan
Unknown	—N/a	Salomé Mall	F	N/A–93	17 May 1891 – 1 December 1984; 93 years, 198 days
1 December 1984	3 years, 105 days	Franziska Michel	F	93–96	8 June 1891 – 15 March 1988; 96 years, 281 days
15 March 1988	2 years, 224 days	Hélène Marx	F	92–94	9 December 1895 – 25 October 1990; 94 years, 320 days
25 October 1990	2 years, 68 days	Marie Kuhn	F	93–95	30 January 1897 – 1 January 1993; 95 years, 337 days
1 January 1993	1 year, 277 days	Françoise Schwartzenberger and Joséphine Schwartzenberger	F	91–92	7 December 1901 – 22 May 2007; 105 years, 166 days 7 December 1901 – 5 October 1994; 92 years, 302 days
5 October 1994	12 years, 229 days	Françoise Schwartzenberger	F	92–105	7 December 1901 – 22 May 2007; 105 years, 166 days
22 May 2007	4 years, 252 days	Henri Haas	M	98–102	9 February 1909 – 29 January 2012; 102 years, 354 days
29 January 2012	1 year, 207 days	Madeleine Weiss	F	98–99	30 September 1913 – 24 August 2013; 99 years, 328 days
24 August 2013	2 years, 79 days	Madeleine Langenfeld (née Haessig)	F	95–98	28 August 1917 – 11 November 2015; 98 years, 75 days
11 November 2015	100 days	Anne Rothstein	F	94–95	14 February 1921 – 19 February 2016; 95 years, 5 days
19 February 2016	3 years, 230 days	Louis Hofmann	M	93–96	15 November 1922 – 7 October 2019; 96 years, 326 days
7 October 2019	110 days	Marguerite Wenner	F	95–96	20 January 1924 – 25 January 2020; 96 years, 5 days
25 January 2020	6 years, 299 days	Barbe Roth (née Weimer)	F	95–102*	born 5 June 1924; 102 years, 168 days

== Chronological list of the oldest known living man in Kutzenhausen ==
To be completed

From	Duration	Name	Age(s) when oldest	Lifespan
Unknown	—N/a	Joseph Heideyer	N/A–91*	born 2 February 1935; 91 years, 291 days

== See also ==
- Communes of the Bas-Rhin department
