= Delta de la Sauer National Nature Reserve =

National nature reserve of France

Coordinates: 48.904°N 8.133°E

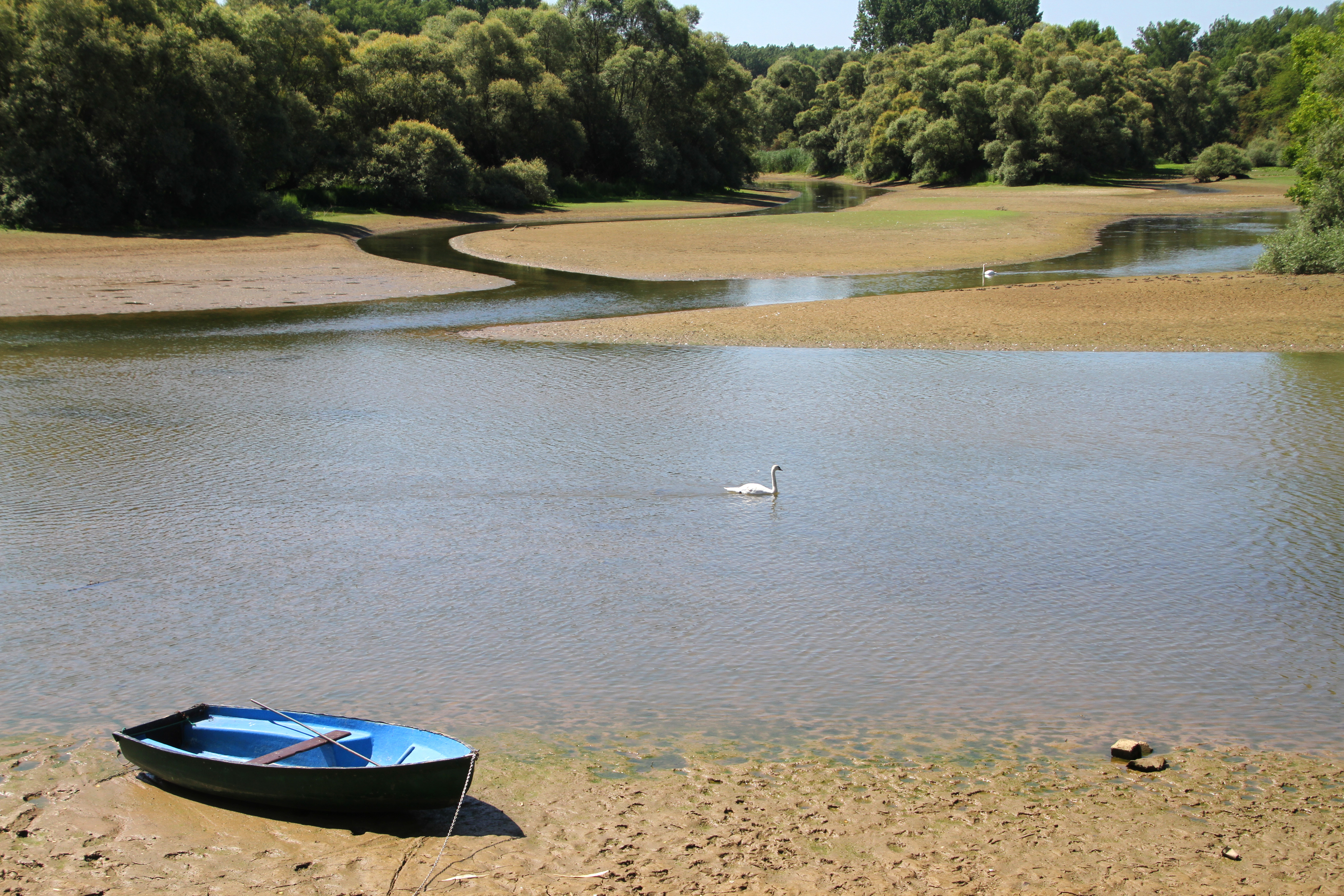

The Delta de la Sauer (Sauer Delta) National Nature Reserve (RNN 135) is a national nature reserve in the Grand Est region in France. Created in 1997, it extends over 486 ha and protects a Rhine wetland with remarkable biodiversity.

== Localisation ==
The Sauer delta is located in the Grand Est region in the north of the Bas-Rhin department, between the communes of Seltz and Munchhausen, at the point where the Sauer flows into the Rhine river.

== History of site and reserve ==
Around 1845, work to domesticate the Rhine profoundly altered the landscape of the Sauer Delta: the great meanders of the river in this area with a gentle natural gradient were cut off. The site has remained flooded, but the dynamics of many of the river's branches have been seriously impaired. As a result, most of the former dry riverbeds of the Rhine and its branches have been covered with alluvial forests. Since these works, the Sauer, a tributary of the Vosges, takes a meander of the former main course of the Rhine to join the riverbed corrected at Munchhausen. At the end of the 1970s, work on the Rhine canalisation stopped upstream of Munchhausen and spared this remarkable site. In 1997, this area was classified as a nature reserve, due to the importance of its natural heritage, recognised at European level.

== Ecology (biodiversity, ecological interest, etc.) ==
This wetland in the Rhine environment has a remarkable and very varied biodiversity, characterized by a significant variation in the water level of the delta, both under the influence of the Rhine, whose waters rise up through the mouth, and of the Sauer River itself. The area includes a meander of the former main course of the Rhine, which is subject to water level fluctuations. During floods, the river spreads over the whole area, while the mudflats appear with their procession of wading birds. The environments are mainly composed of alluvial forests. There is also a large area of wet meadows, interspersed with depressions and reed beds.
