= Petit Ried =

Ried in Alsace, France

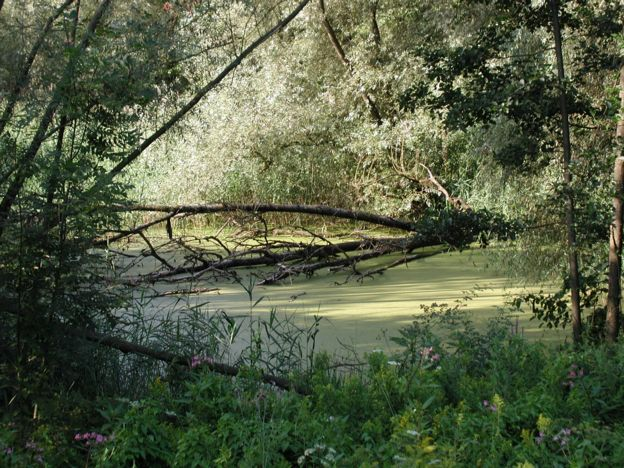
Ried of la Wantzenau.

The Petit Ried (occasionally referred to as Ried-Nord) is located in north-eastern Alsace. It stretches between the Robertsau Forest in Strasbourg in the south, and Lauterbourg in the north. It borders on Outre-Forêt. The Petit Ried shows a typical Ried landscape. It spreads over a narrow strip along the river Rhine. It is accessible because of the railway Strasbourg-Lauterbourg, as well as the motorway A35 between Hœrdt and Lauterbourg.

In the Petit Ried, three rivers flow into the Rhine River:

- the Ill in Offendorf
- the Moder in Beinheim
- the Sauer in Munchhausen, which actually takes its source in Germany

To the east, the Black Forest with the Hornisgrinde stands out against the horizon. The Vosges are more inconspicuous because they lie further away, and are not as high as the Black Forest.

The Petit Ried is densely populated, and is relatively rich, as many cross-border workers live there.

== Baggersee ==
Numerous sand and gravel pits (which are locally called Baggersee, as in nearby Germany) are in operation (in La Wantzenau, Hoerdt and Offendorf for instance). Old pits are still used for recreational activities like bathing (in Reichstett, Bischheim and Gambsheim for instance) or diving.

== Nature reserves ==
Two national nature reserves are located in the Petit Ried, more precisely:

- Sauer delta Nature Reserve in Munchhausen
- Offendorf Forest Nature Reserve in Offendorf

== Fish pass ==
Both dams in Iffezheim (D) and in Gambsheim (F) are equipped with a fish pass. In Gambsheim, it is possible to observe fish migration in a small museum. Downstream from Beinheim, there are no more dams, which explains why the zone between Beinheim and Lauterbourg is intriguing from an environmental point of view. This is where the Sauer Delta Nature Reserve is located, but the Rhine is still subjected to the needs of navigation.

== Renewable energies ==
The starch manufacturer Roquette Frères in Beinheim is supplied with heat from the terrestrial heat plant in Rittershoffen. The dams in Gambsheim and Iffezheim produce electricity. In Gambsheim the French grid is fed, whereas the German grid is fed in Iffezheim. The biogas produced by the sewage plant in Strasbourg is fed into the French gas network.

== Tourism ==
There are tourism offices in Gambsheim, Soufflenheim, Seltz and Lauterbourg. Soufflenheim is renowned for its coloured Alsatian potteries. In Offendorf, a barge houses the inland water shipping Museum. The Gambsheim locks are equipped with France's largest sluices.

== Adjacent Zone ==
The Haguenau Forest plays an important role, as a link between the Northern Vosges and the Petit Ried. It constitutes as such a major wildlife corridor.

== See also ==
- Grand Ried
