= Outre-Forêt =

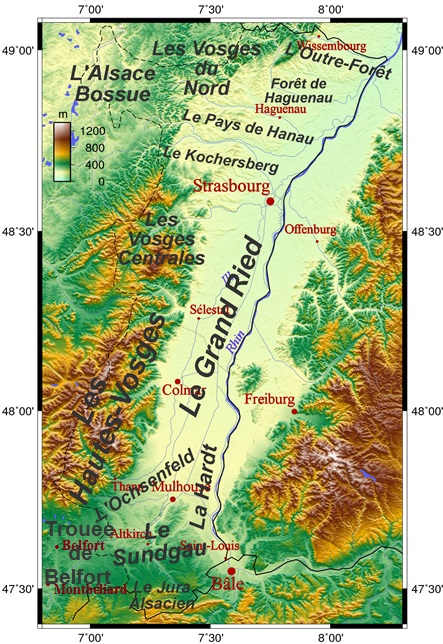
Natural regions in Alsace.

The Outre-Forêt (Unteremwàld in Alsatian) is a natural region which is located in the very north of Alsace, bordering on Rhineland-Palatinate. Outre-Forêt means in French beyond the forest, beyond the Haguenau Forest. To the north, it is bounded by the Bienwald as well as by the Lauter. To the east, it is bounded by the Rhine and the Petit Ried. To the west, it is bounded by the Northern Vosges and the River Falkensteinerbach. As a frontier zone off the beaten tracks, the Outre-Forêt has managed to keep its traditions; numerous timbered houses can be admired, pottery is well developed. Far away from the traditional Alsatian vineyards, grapes are grown here.

== Geography ==
The Outre-Forêt is bounded by the Haguenau Forest to the south, the Bienwald to the north, the wooded Northern Vosges to the West, and by the Rhine to the east. In the east, there is also the Petit Ried. The Outre-Forêt stretches between the Lauter valley and the sandy alluvial fans of the Sauer and Moder.

The area is characterized by slopes and hills, the altitude of which is modest. In Surbourg the altitude reaches 217 m over the sea level. To the west, the vineyard of Cleebourg shows a gentle slope. The Benedictine monks of the Abbey of Wissembourg had already grown grapes in the Middle Age. Unlike the adjacent forests and meadows, the Outre-Forêt is a region of arable land, which lends itself to poly-culture thanks to its top layer made up of clay.

== Language ==
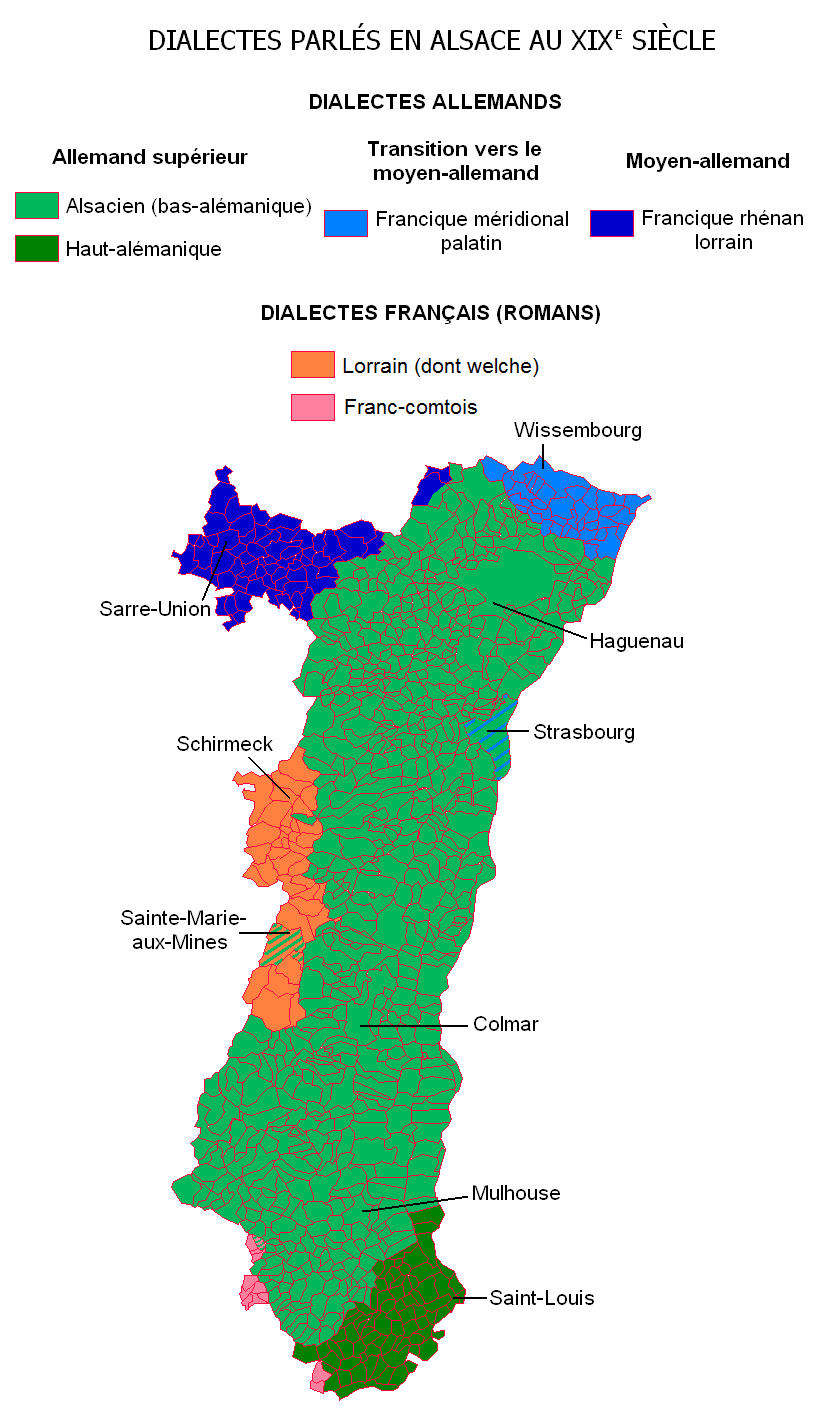
Map of languages in Alsace in 1910

While the rest of Alsace speaks Alemannic, South Frankish is spoken in Outre-Forêt (in the Alsace bossue known as krummes Elsass in German, Frankish is spoken too, as in northern Lorraine). Obviously, the official language remains French, as in whole France.

== History ==
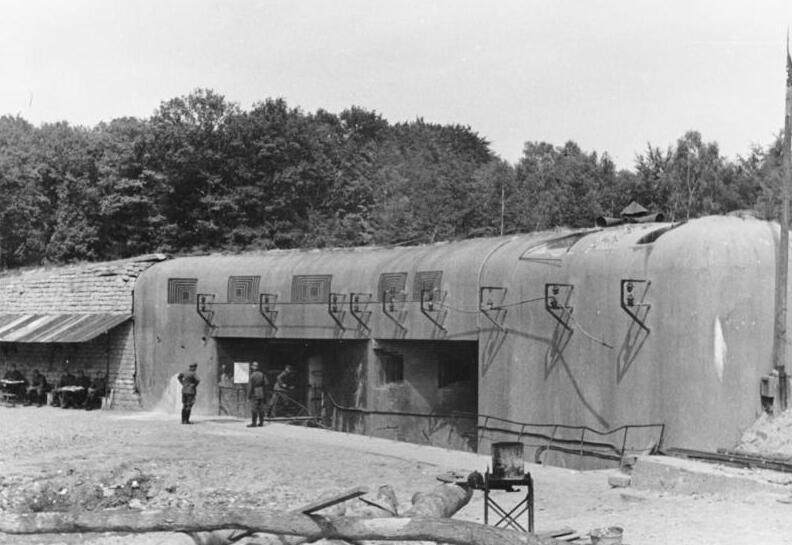
Le fort de Schœnenbourg en août 1940.

The Maginot line, as in fort Schœnenbourg for instance, crossed the Outre-Forêt, the history of which was turbulent. In Hatten there is a Musée de l'Abri (shelter museum).

== Traditions ==
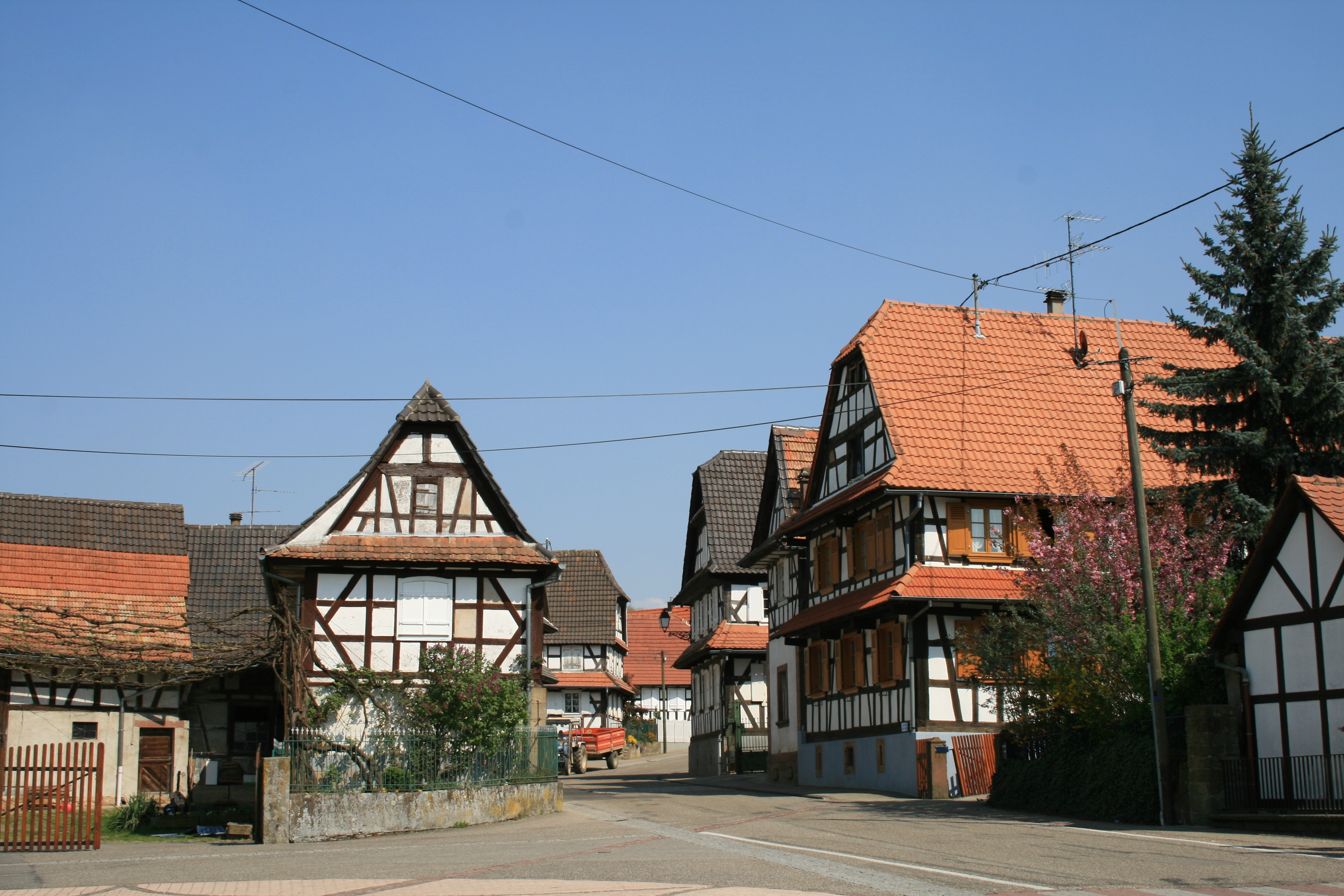
Hunspach.

When the Haguenau Forest was still an obstacle, and before cars ushered in a new era of mobility, the region was isolated. Therefore, the Outre-Forêt managed to better keep its traditions alive than any other adjacent region. During feasts (more precisely Streisselhochzeit in Seebach) the local folk costume is still worn. In Kutzenhausen, the museum of local traditions endeavours to show the rural life at the beginning of the 20th century.

Pottery has been being practised here since the Neolithic period. Betschdorf is known for its grey and blue potteries. Grey is due to clay, whereas blue is due to cobalt.

== Economy ==
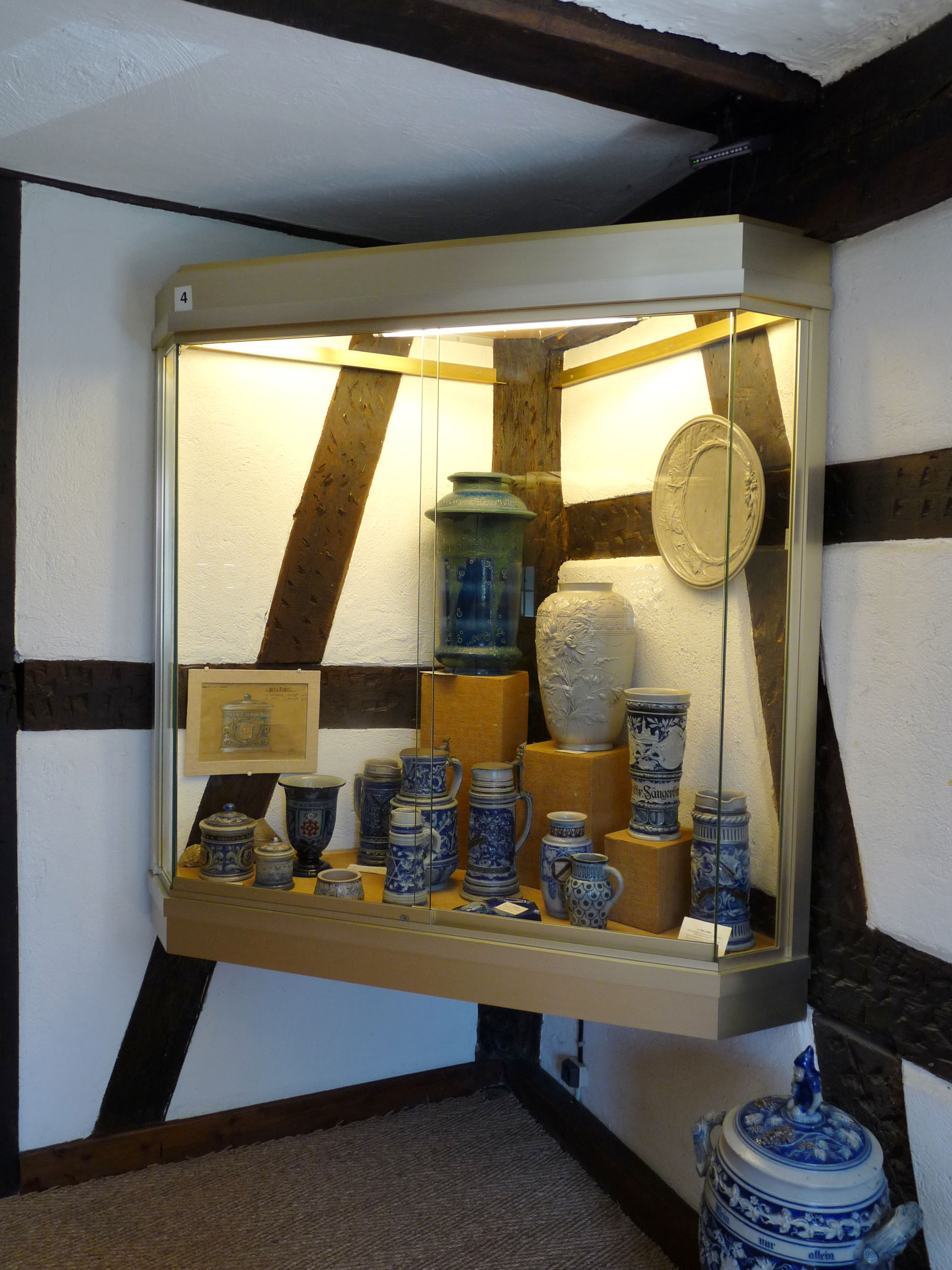
Musée de la poterie de Betschdorf

The oil museum in Merkwiller-Pechelbronn shows the path-breaking work which was done in the region in the field of oil industry. Today, the Hot-Dry-Rock process is applied in Soultz-sous-Forêts in order to tap into the Earth's heat.
