= Lobsann =

Lobsann Lüsann
- Commune
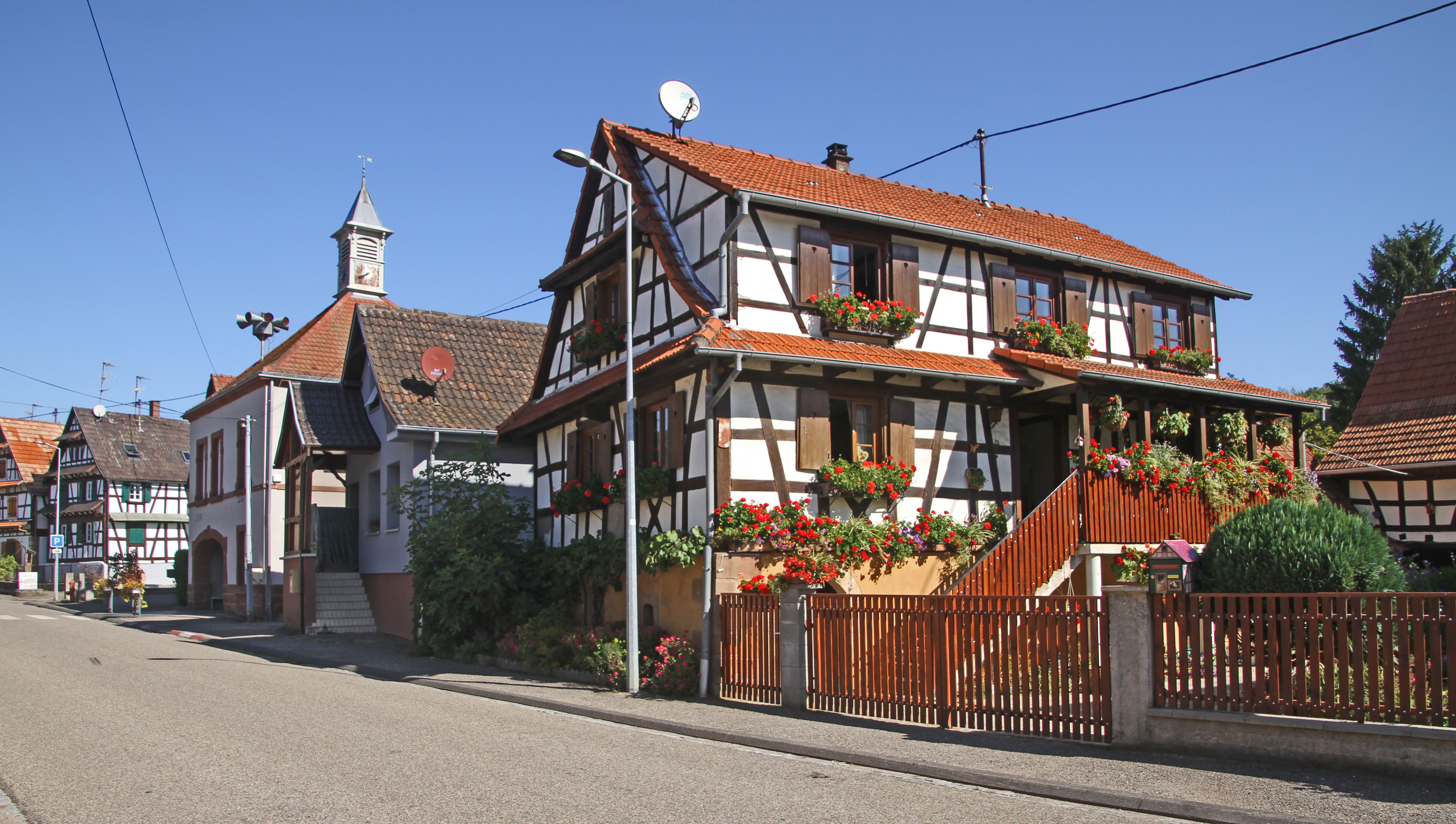
- The town hall in Lobsann

- Coat of arms
- Location of Lobsann
- Location within France Location within Grand Est
- Coordinates: 48°57′51″N 7°50′48″E
- Country: France
- Region: Grand Est
- Department: Bas-Rhin
- Arrondissement: Haguenau-Wissembourg
- Canton: Reichshoffen

Government
  - Mayor (2020–2026): Elisabeth Weinling-Hamel
- Area^{1}: 2.73 km^{2} (1.05 sq mi)
- Highest elevation: 308 m (1,010 ft)
- Lowest elevation: 157 m (515 ft)
- Population (2023): 663
  - Density: 243/km^{2} (629/sq mi)
- Time zone: UTC+01:00 (CET)
  - Summer (DST): UTC+02:00 (CEST)
- INSEE/Postal code: 67271 /67250
- ^{1} French Land Register data, which excludes lakes, ponds, glaciers > 1 km^{2} (0.386 sq mi or 247 acres) and river estuaries.

Lobsann is a commune in Bas-Rhin, a department in Grand Est in north-eastern France.

== History ==
The history of Lobsann draws its sources from a few documents, including maps of Lower Alsace, which were rarely used in the past. This could have prevented hypotheses that, however poetic, were not based on reliable evidence. This rural territory was likely cleared during the major population boom of the 13th century, which led to the clearing and grubbing of forested areas crossed by roads. The Fleckenstein family, lords of Lembach and Soultz, saw fit to establish serfs as shepherds in this uncultivated and damp area bordering the heights of the Hochwald.

A community of shepherds, placed under the protection of Saint Wendelin, developed within a traditional rural economy. Lobsann, also known as Lausau, was never established as a parish and, depending on the time and the decisions of the administrators, was an annex of Soultz or Kutzenhausen, or both. The tithe was collected locally by one or the other tithe barn, but no one was exempt.

The world's first oil well, drilled in 1813, is located in the direction of Merkwiller-Pechelbronn (a former French oil site) within the Kutzenhausen municipal boundaries.

== See also ==
- Communes of the Bas-Rhin department
