= Soultzbach (Sauer) =

- Location within France Location within Grand Est

Location
- Country: France
- Region: Alsace
- Department: Bas-Rhin

Physical characteristics
- Source
  - location: In the Forêt de Katzenthal in the North Vosges, northwest of the hamlet of Soultzthal
  - coordinates: 49°00′47″N 7°41′35″E
  - elevation: ca. 310 m
- Mouth
  - location: Near Wœrth into the Sauer
  - coordinates: 48°56′31″N 7°44′50″E
  - elevation: ca. 170 m
- Length: 10.1 km
- Basin size: 20.2 km^{2} (7.8 sq mi)
- Discharge
  - location: mouth
  - average: 0.228 m^{3}/s (8.1 cu ft/s)

Basin features
- Progression: Sauer→ Rhine→ North Sea
- Reference no.: FR: "A3610860" (in French). Sandre.

The Soultzbach (also Ruisseau le Soulzbach) is a river in Alsace, France. It is 10 kilometres (6.2 mi) long, and is a right tributary of the Sauer.
