= Ried (natural region) =

Meadow and forest region in Alsace, France

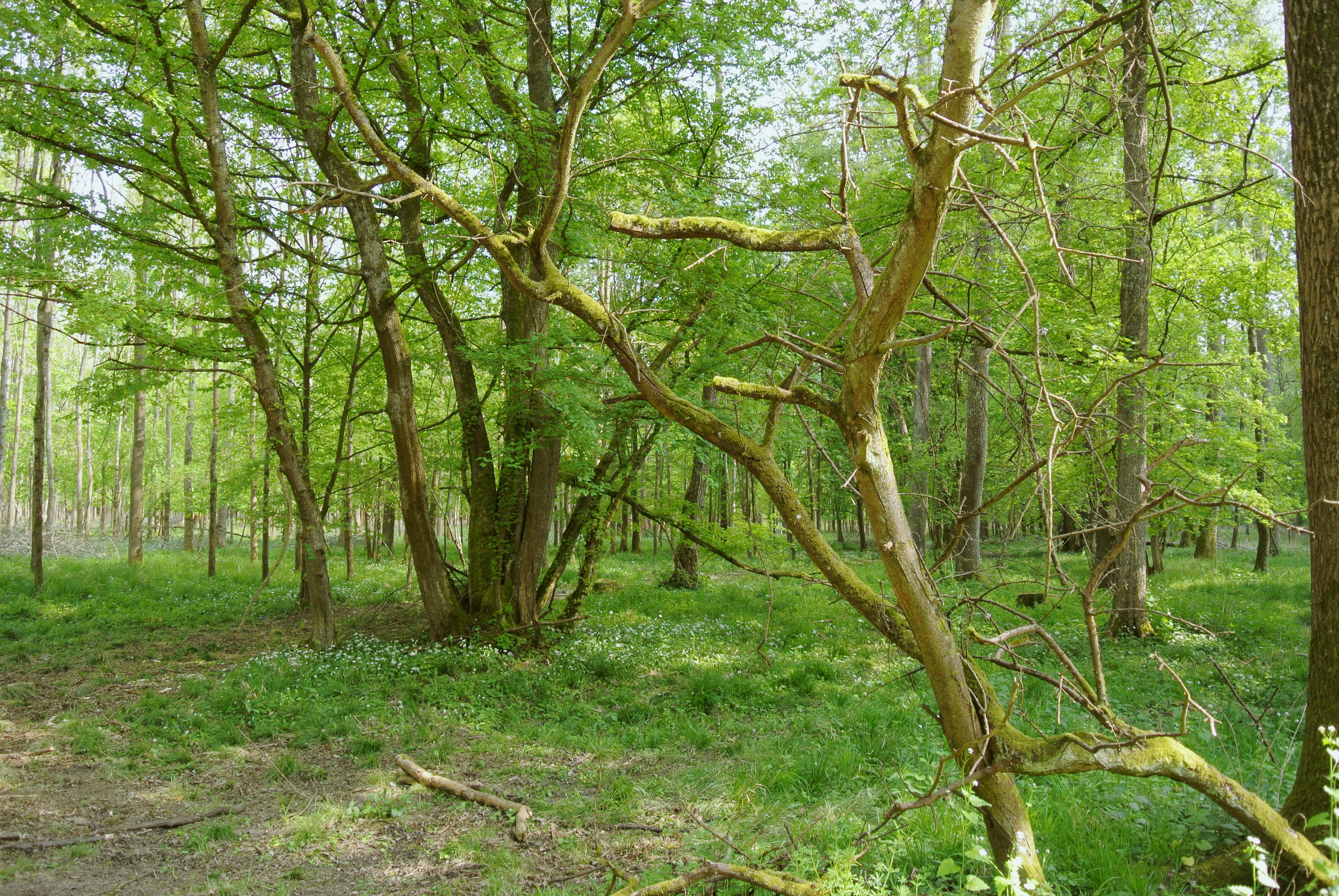
Illwald forest

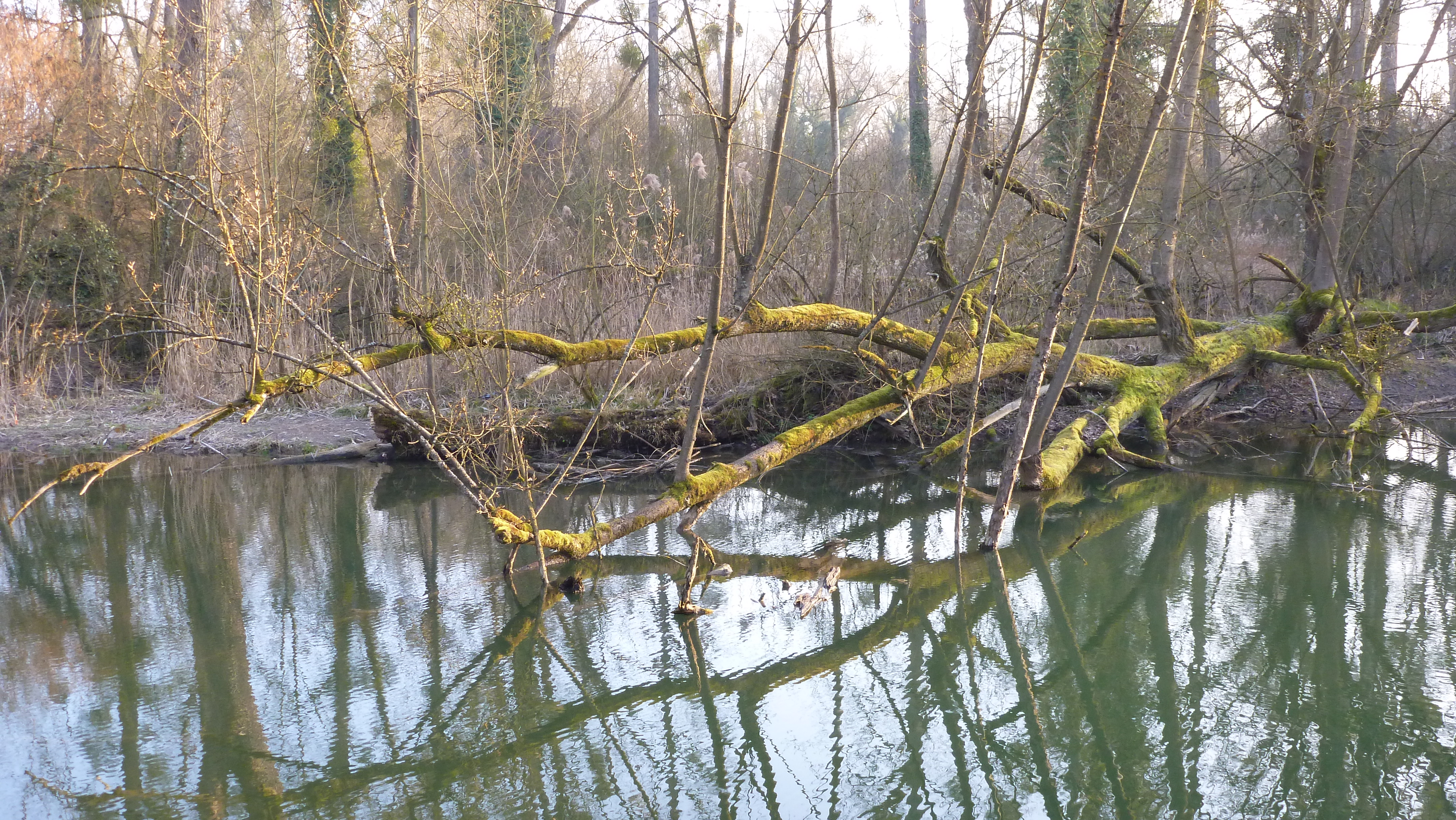
Alluvial forest in Strasbourg (Rohrschollen)

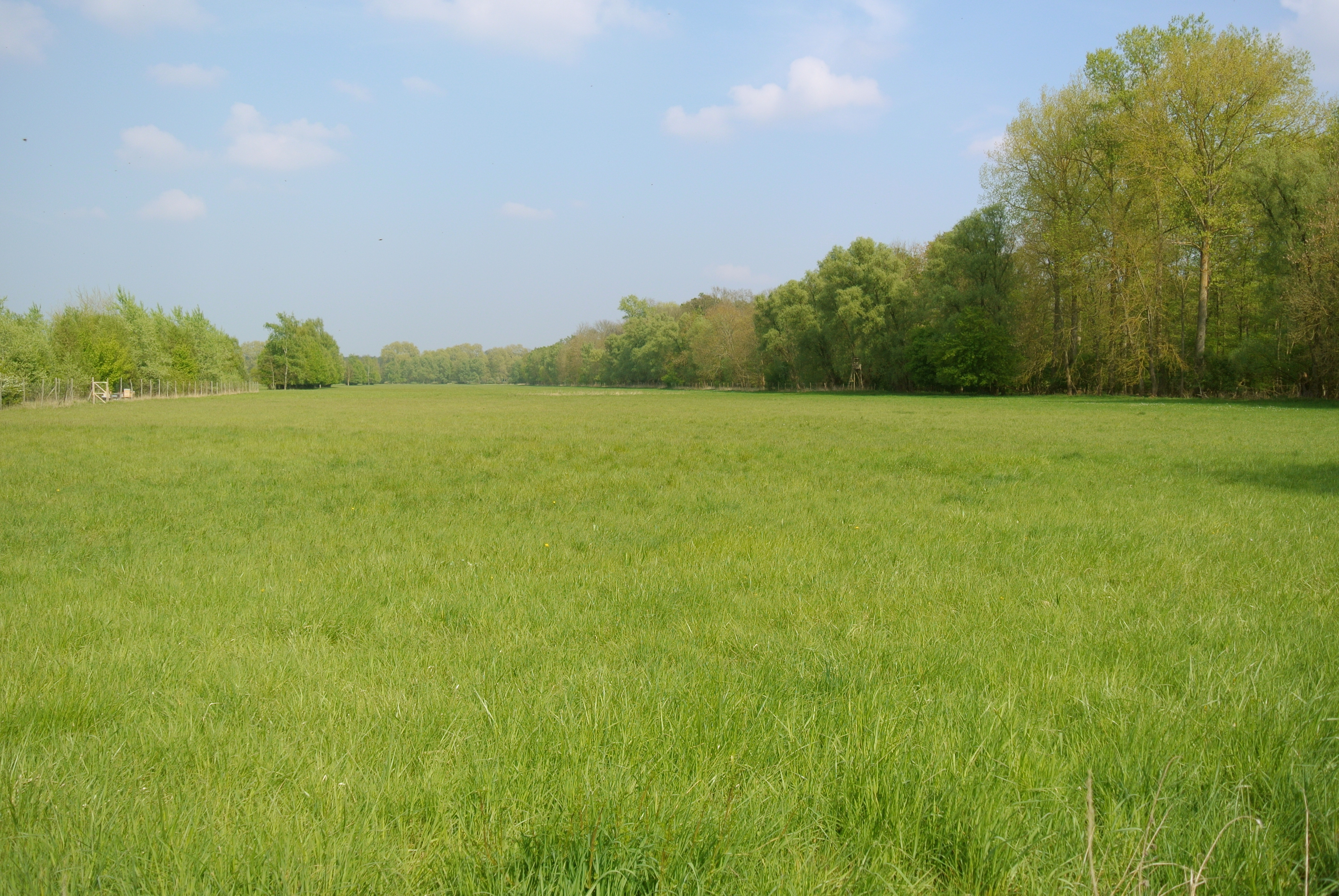
Ried of Sélestat

The Alsatian ried (French pronunciation: [ʁid]) consists of meadows liable to flooding, and of gallery forests, whose vegetation is lush. The ried was formed by the then meandering Rhine, before it was canalised. The Petit Ried lies north of Strasbourg, whereas the Grand Ried lies south of Strasbourg. The town of Rhinau possesses 1,000 hectares of the last example of a temperate gallery forest in Western Europe, which is located on the right bank of the Rhine.

== Toponymy ==
The word "ried" derives from Alemannic "Rieth" which means reed, and is related to the English word.

== Geography ==
Today's Rhine is a pale reflection of what it used to be. Formerly, it used to be many kilometres broad, spreading its sediments on a large zone, with Europe's largest water table discharging into the Rhine, or recharging from it, depending on the seasons. In return, the Rhine has become navigable, and provides Alsace with abundant hydroelectricity. As a matter of fact, France claims for itself the hydroelectricity produced here, according to the treaty of Versailles. Only the most recent dams, namely Gambsheim (F) - Freistett (D) and Iffezheim (D) - Beinheim (F), both of them located downstream of Strasbourg in the Petit Ried, produce electricity shared evenly by both states. The Iffezheim dam has just been equipped with a fifth turbine.

== Ornithology ==
The Rhine Rift, and the Ried, is located on a major corridor as regards bird migration (the other major French corridor is located over the English Channel and the Atlantic Ocean).

== Geology ==
In the Quaternary period, while the Rhine rift was subsiding, sediment made up of sand and gravel coming partly from the Vosges but above all from the Alps built up. The sediment thickness reaches 75 m in Strasbourg, 250 m in Neuf-Brisach, and 150 m in Mulhouse. Sand coming from the Vosges shows a higher tourmaline content, whereas sand coming from the Alps, which makes up the major part of the sand encountered in the Ried, is characterised by a combination of heavy minerals (green hornblend, epidote and garnet ). Formerly, the Rhine was flowing into the Rhone, until the barrier constituted by the Kaiserstuhl disappeared. Thanks to their porosity, these weak rocks house Europe's largest water table. The estimated water quantity amounts to 300 billions cubic metres (of which 50 billion is only in Alsace). Numerous sand and gravel pits can be encountered in the Ried, thus making Alsace one of the most productive regions in France, in terms of building materials.

== See also ==
- Upper Rhine Plain

== Links ==
- Observatoire de la nappe phréatique d'Alsace website Aprona
- Gravel of the Rhine website 'Association Strasbourgeoise des Amis de la Minéralogie 67
- Ried map website 'Observatoire des Zones humides.
