= Grand Ried =

Ried in Alsace, France

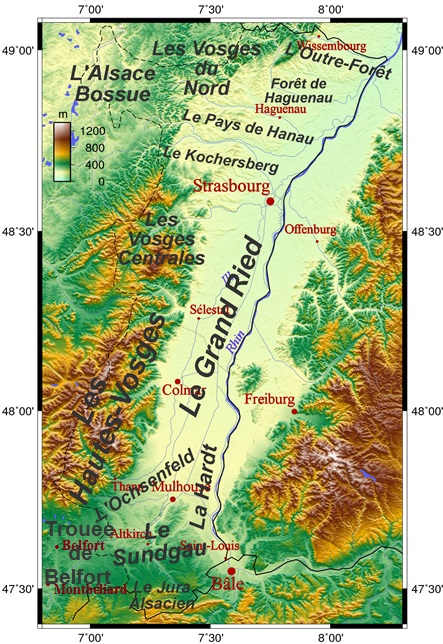
Alsace and its natural regions

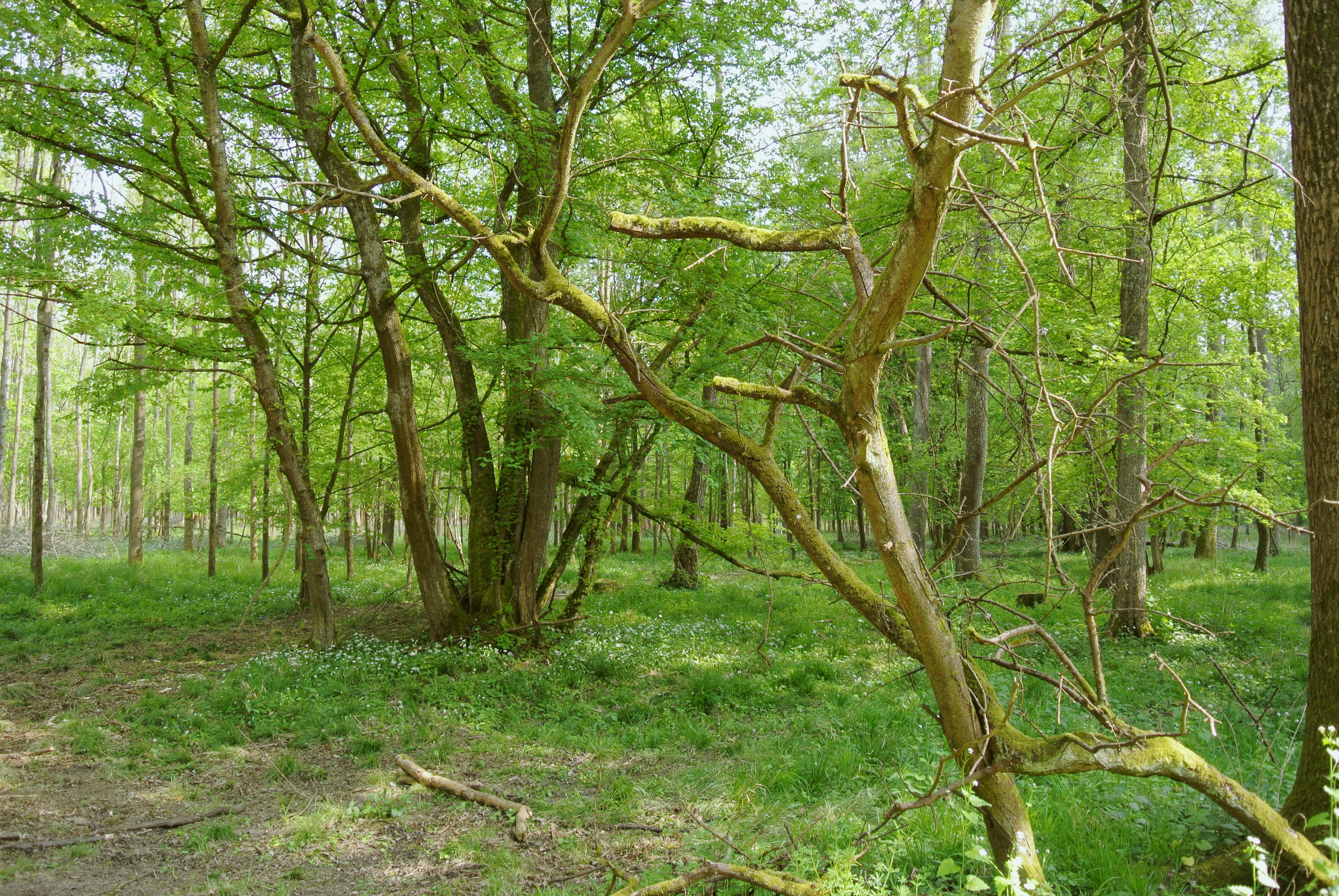
Illwald forest.

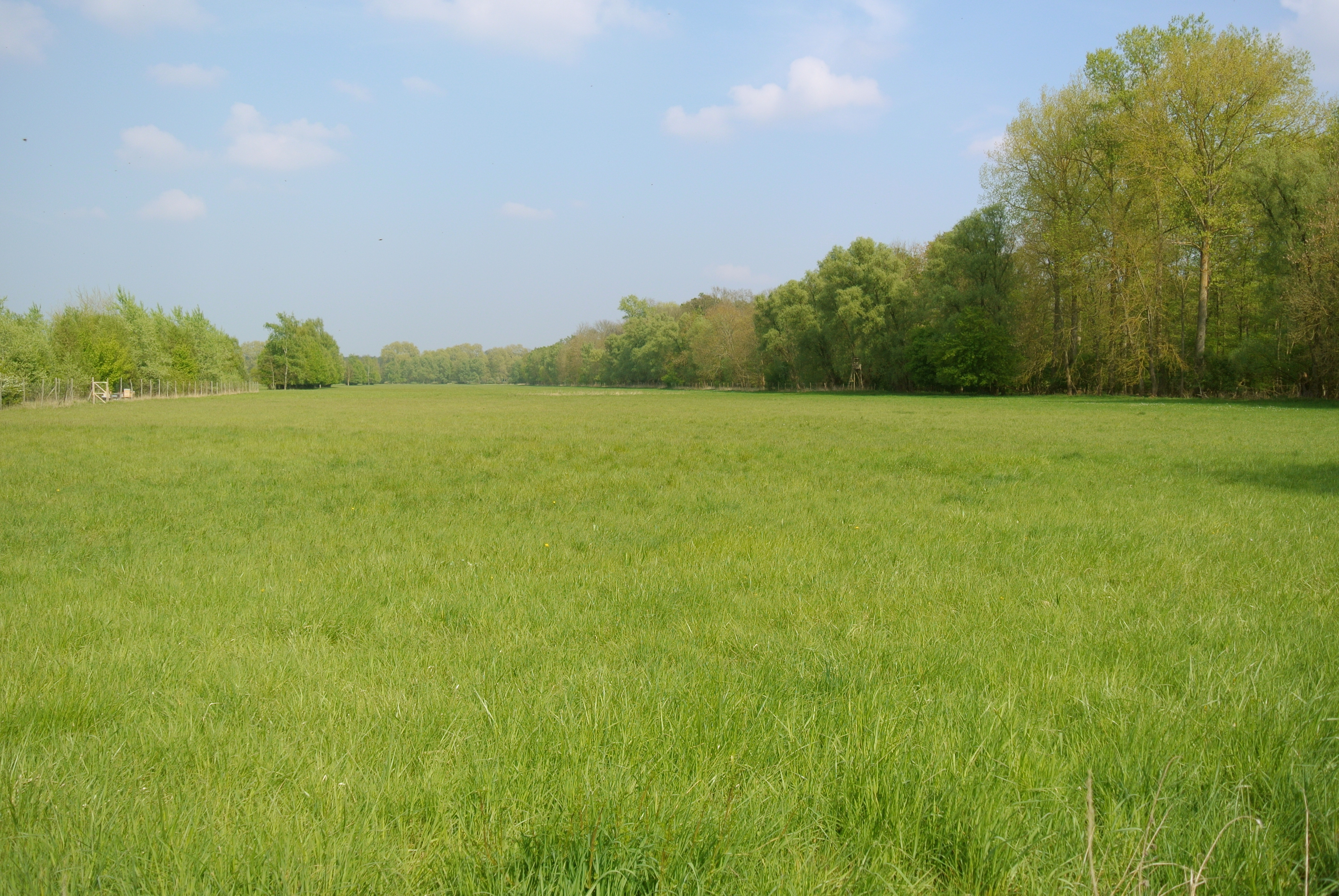
Ried of Sélestat.

The Grand Ried is an Alsatian natural region which is part of the Ried. It shows landscapes typical of the Ried. To the west, it is delimited by the Ill, and by the Rhine to the east. It stretches between Strasbourg and Colmar. It was formed by the meandering Rhine (and Ill), before it was canalised. The Rhine used to spread its sediments when inundations occurred. Today the Rhine is corseted between embankments.

The Erstein polder is used to regulate the flow of the Rhine, thus avoiding inundations. It has been listed as a national nature reserve since 1989. As a matter of fact, it is still possible to discover in the reserve the biodiversity which used to exist when the Grand Ried was wild and the Rhine was not canalised.

The commune of Rhinau presents a unique feature: it possesses an area of almost 1000 ha directly at the border, however on German soil. This is Rheinau. The landscape is characterised by numerous Baggersee (German word used in Alsace and meaning lakes forming once sand and gravel pits have been shut down) and sand pits which are still being operated.

== Nature reserves ==
There are national nature reserves:

- Île de Rhinau
- Île du Rohrschollen
- Massif forestier de Strasbourg-Neuhof/Illkirch-Graffenstaden

as well as a regional nature reserve:

- Forêt de l'Illwald (next to Sélestat)

Let us mention that there is a nature reserve in Rheinau:

- Taubergießen

on German soil.

== Renewable energy ==
In Marckolsheim, Rhinau, Gerstheim, Muttersholtz as well as Strasbourg hydro-electricity is produced by France.

== See also ==
- Petit Ried
