= Kutzenhausen, Bavaria =

Kutzenhausen
- Municipality
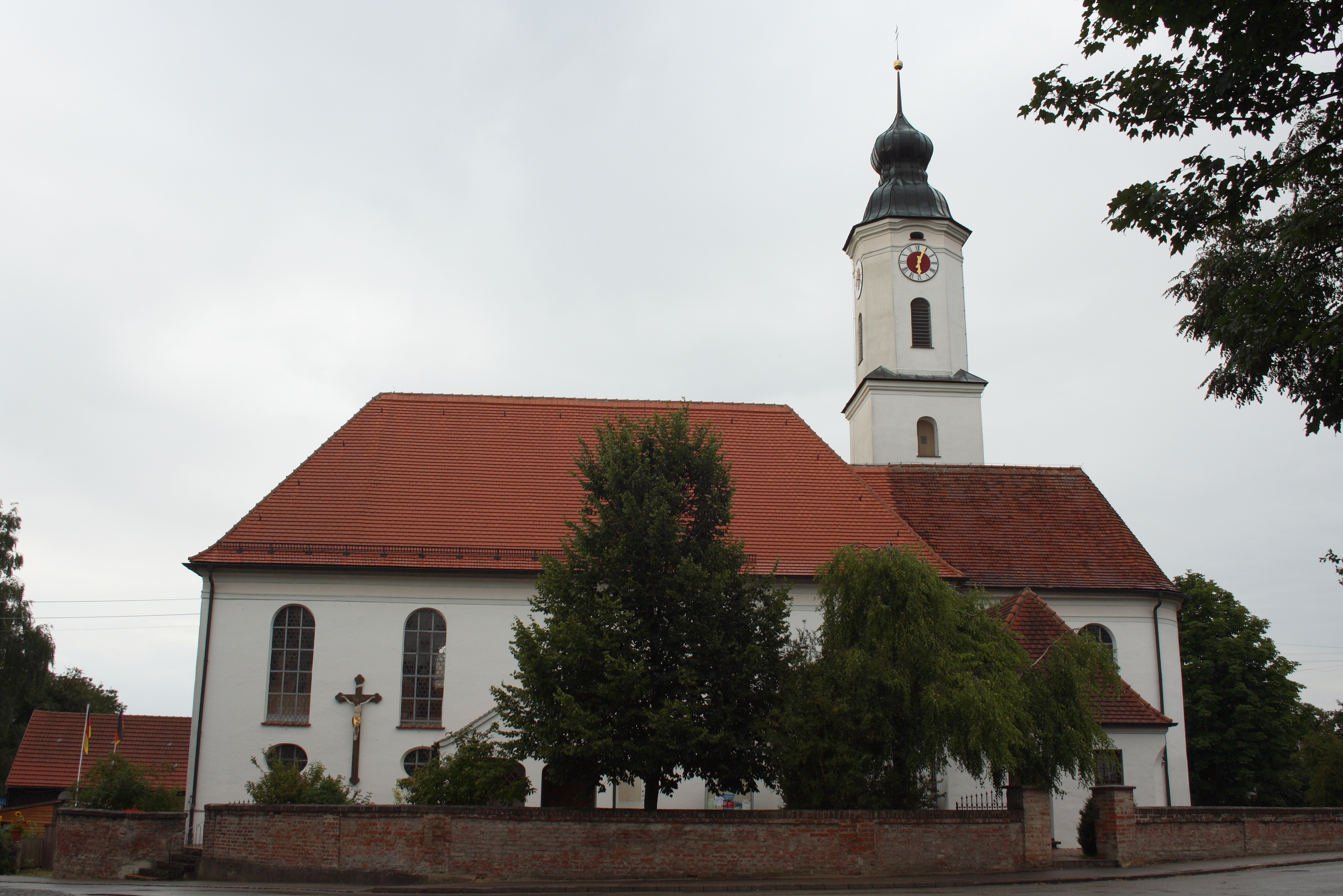
- Church of Saint Nicholas

- Coat of arms

- Location of Kutzenhausen within Augsburg district
- Interactive map of Kutzenhausen
- Location within Germany Location within Bavaria
- Coordinates: 48°20′N 10°42′E
- Country: Germany
- State: Bavaria
- Admin. region: Schwaben
- District: Augsburg

Government
  - Mayor (2020–26): Andreas Weißenbrunner

Area
  - Total: 27.93 km^{2} (10.78 sq mi)
- Elevation: 478 m (1,568 ft)

Population (2025-12-31)
  - Total: 2,730
  - Density: 97.7/km^{2} (253/sq mi)
- Time zone: UTC+01:00 (CET)
  - Summer (DST): UTC+02:00 (CEST)
- Postal codes: 86500
- Dialling codes: 08238-08294
- Vehicle registration: A
- Website: www.kutzenhausen.de

Kutzenhausen is a municipality in Augsburg district, Bavaria in Germany.

== Twin towns ==
- (France) Kutzenhausen, Bas-Rhin since 1987.
