= Surbourg =

Surbourg Sürburi
- Commune
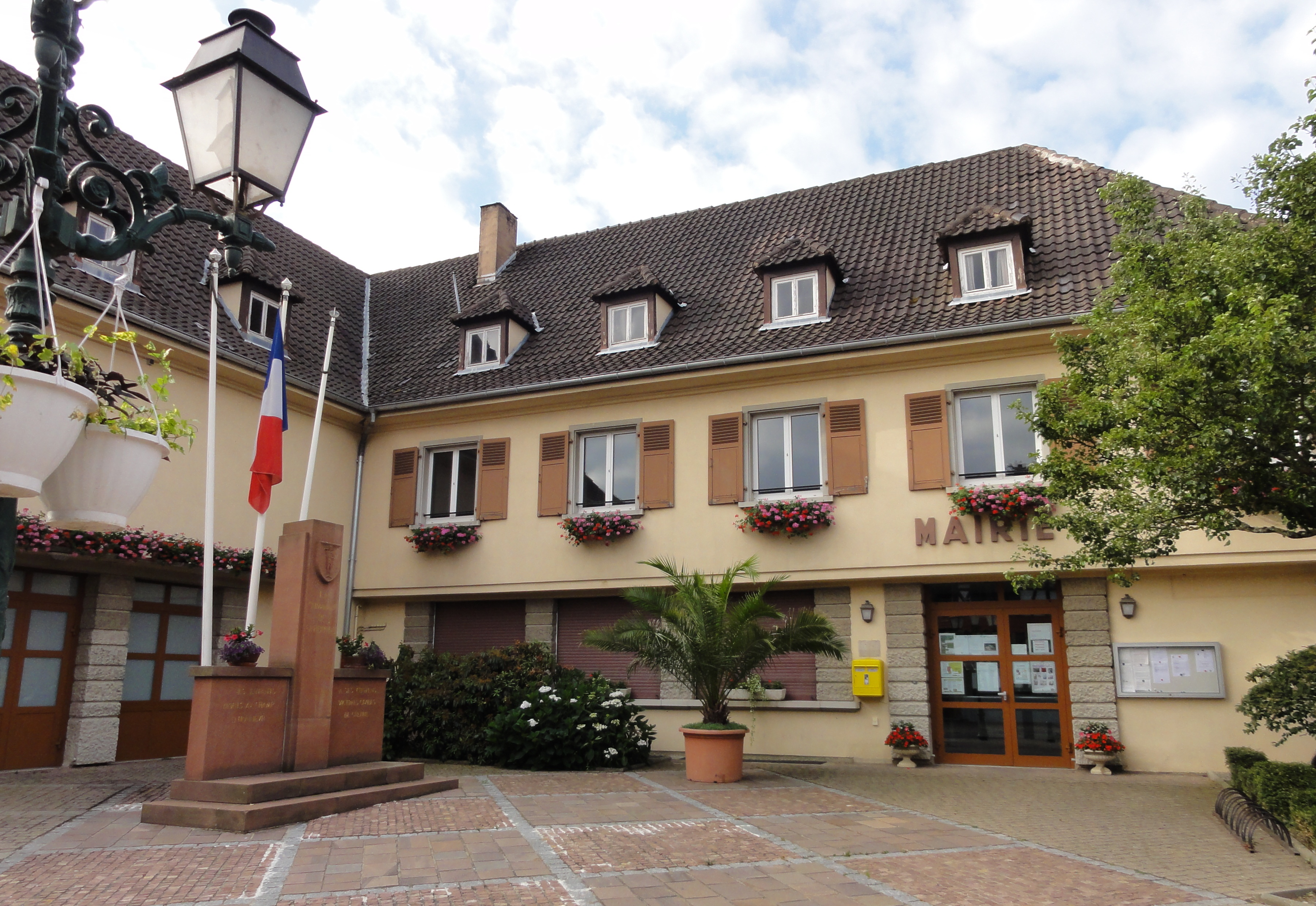
- The town hall in Surbourg

- Coat of arms
- Location of Surbourg
- Location within France Location within Grand Est
- Coordinates: 48°54′35″N 7°50′55″E
- Country: France
- Region: Grand Est
- Department: Bas-Rhin
- Arrondissement: Haguenau-Wissembourg
- Canton: Wissembourg

Government
  - Mayor (2020–2026): Olivier Roux
- Area^{1}: 10.46 km^{2} (4.04 sq mi)
- Highest elevation: 218 m (715 ft)
- Lowest elevation: 144 m (472 ft)
- Population (2023): 1,733
  - Density: 165.7/km^{2} (429.1/sq mi)
- Time zone: UTC+01:00 (CET)
  - Summer (DST): UTC+02:00 (CEST)
- INSEE/Postal code: 67487 /67250
- ^{1} French Land Register data, which excludes lakes, ponds, glaciers > 1 km^{2} (0.386 sq mi or 247 acres) and river estuaries.

Surbourg (German: Surburg) is a commune in the Bas-Rhin department in Grand Est in north-eastern France.

== See also ==
- Communes of the Bas-Rhin department
