= Gœrsdorf =

Gœrsdorf Gerschdorf
- Commune
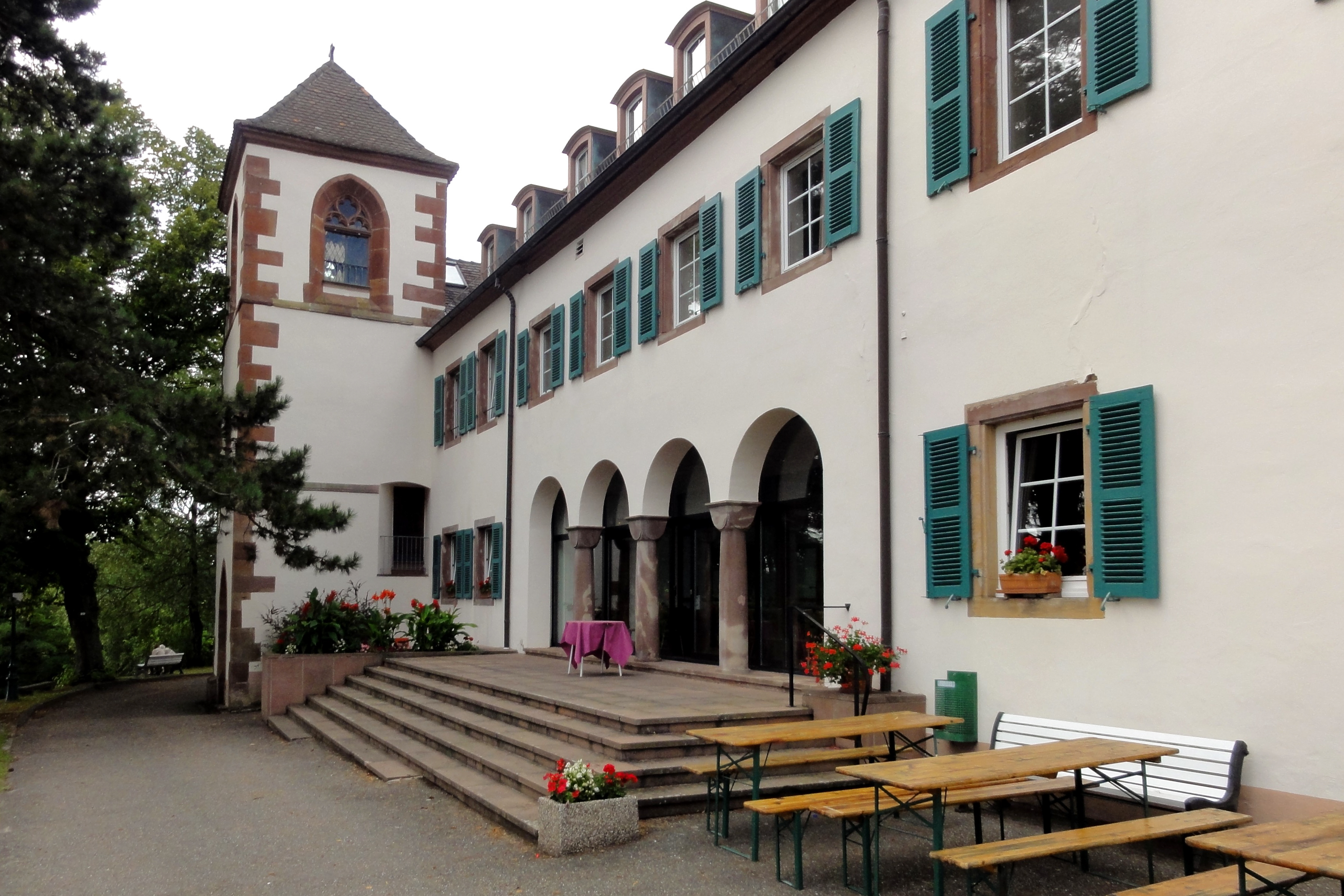
- The Liebfrauenberg convent in Gœrsdorf

- Coat of arms
- Location of Gœrsdorf
- Location within France Location within Grand Est
- Coordinates: 48°57′09″N 7°46′11″E
- Country: France
- Region: Grand Est
- Department: Bas-Rhin
- Arrondissement: Haguenau-Wissembourg
- Canton: Reichshoffen

Government
  - Mayor (2020–2026): Freddy Cuntz
- Area^{1}: 13.14 km^{2} (5.07 sq mi)
- Highest elevation: 463 m (1,519 ft)
- Lowest elevation: 164 m (538 ft)
- Population (2023): 1,039
  - Density: 79.07/km^{2} (204.8/sq mi)
- Time zone: UTC+01:00 (CET)
  - Summer (DST): UTC+02:00 (CEST)
- INSEE/Postal code: 67160 /67360
- ^{1} French Land Register data, which excludes lakes, ponds, glaciers > 1 km^{2} (0.386 sq mi or 247 acres) and river estuaries.

Gœrsdorf (French pronunciation: [ɡœʁsdɔʁf]; German: Görsdorf) is a commune in the Bas-Rhin department in Grand Est in north-eastern France. The commune merged with Mitschdorf at the start of 1973.

Gœrsdorf is part of the Northern Vosges Regional Nature Park.

== Notable people ==
Author and priest Joseph Kuntz was born at Gœrsdorf on 25 July 1850: he died on 7 January 1892. Between those dates he founded the journal "l'Elsässer" with his sponsor, Abbot Muller-Simonis. (The German language name of the journal recalls the fact that between 1871 and 1918 Alsace was part of Germany).

== See also ==
- Communes of the Bas-Rhin department
