= Sauer (Rhine) =

River in France and Germany

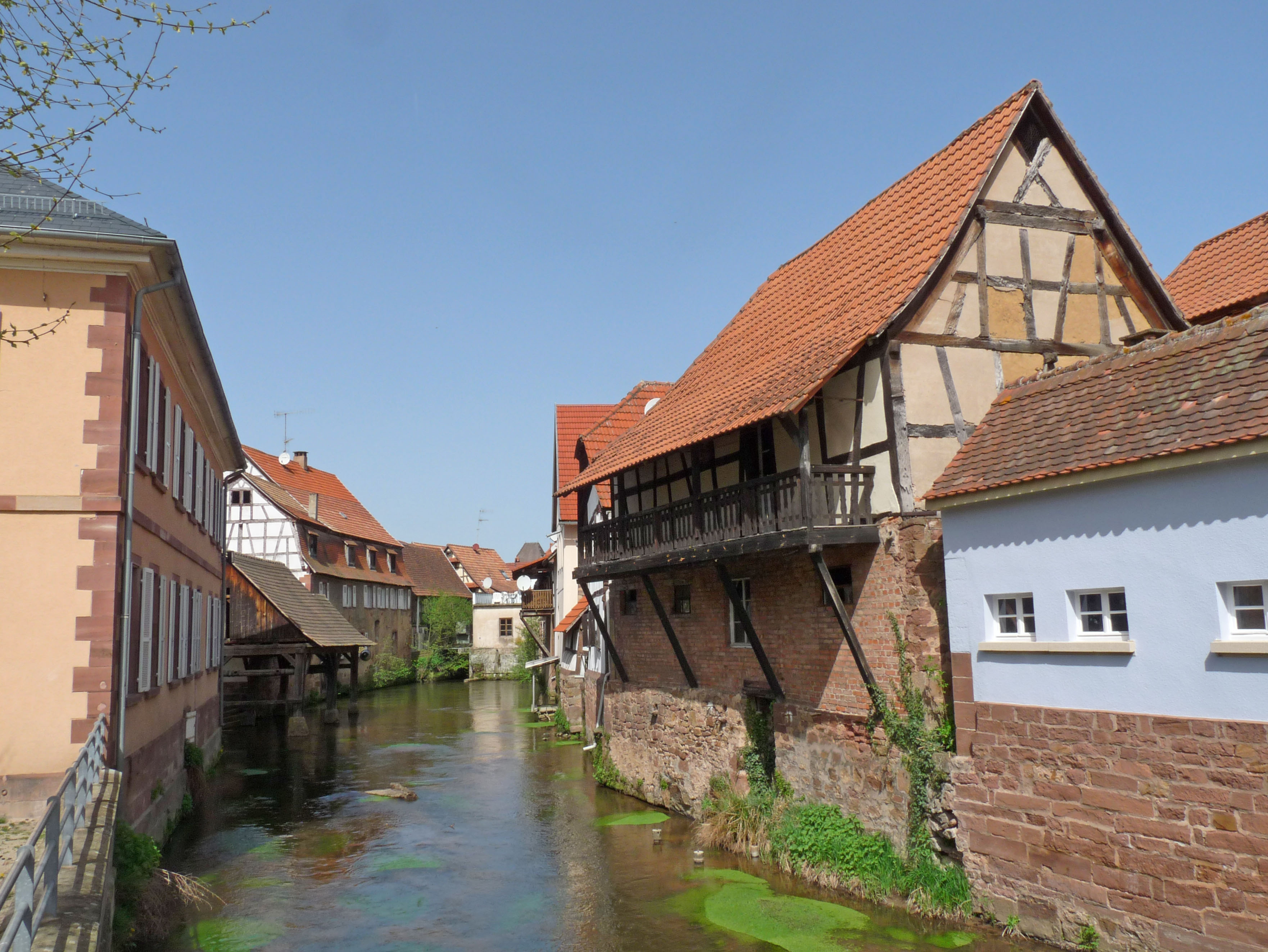
- The Sauer in Wœrth

- Location within France Location within Grand Est

Location
- Countries: Germany and France

Physical characteristics
- Source
  - location: Palatine Forest
- Mouth
  - location: Rhine
  - coordinates: 48°54′55″N 8°9′25″E
- Length: ~85 km (53 mi)

Basin features
- Progression: Rhine→ North Sea

The Sauer is a river in France (Alsace) and Germany (Rhineland-Palatinate). A left tributary of the river Rhine, its total length is about 85 kilometres (53 mi), of which 64 km (40 mi) in France. Its upper course, in Germany, is called Saarbach. Its source is in the Palatinate Forest, near the French border, south of Pirmasens. It flows into France near Schœnau, and continues through Wœrth and north of Haguenau. It flows into the Rhine in Seltz, opposite the mouth of the Murg.

== Tributaries ==
- Seltzbach
- Soultzbach (Sauer)
