= Hoffen =

Commune in France

Hoffen Hoffe
- Commune
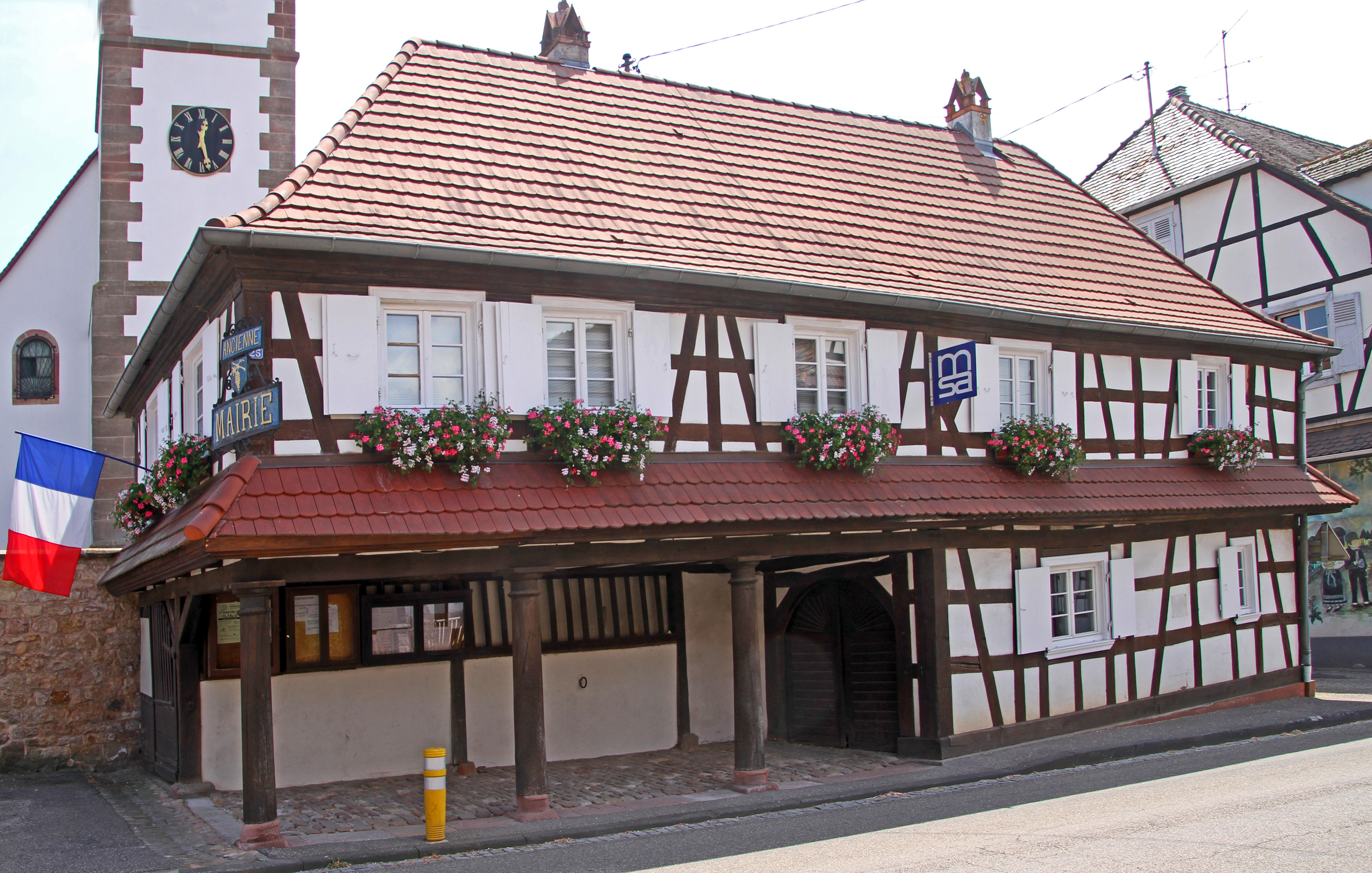
- The town hall in Hoffen

- Coat of arms
- Location of Hoffen
- Location within France Location within Grand Est
- Coordinates: 48°55′50″N 7°56′34″E
- Country: France
- Region: Grand Est
- Department: Bas-Rhin
- Arrondissement: Haguenau-Wissembourg
- Canton: Wissembourg

Government
  - Mayor (2020–2026): Didier Braun
- Area^{1}: 9.45 km^{2} (3.65 sq mi)
- Highest elevation: 192 m (630 ft)
- Lowest elevation: 132 m (433 ft)
- Population (2023): 1,160
  - Density: 123/km^{2} (318/sq mi)
- Time zone: UTC+01:00 (CET)
  - Summer (DST): UTC+02:00 (CEST)
- INSEE/Postal code: 67206 /67250
- ^{1} French Land Register data, which excludes lakes, ponds, glaciers > 1 km^{2} (0.386 sq mi or 247 acres) and river estuaries.

Hoffen (French pronunciation: [ɔfən]; Alsatian: Hoffe) is a commune in the Bas-Rhin department in Grand Est in north-eastern France.

== Geography ==
The village is within easy walking distance of departmental road RD 263 which links Wissembourg and Haguenau as well as the local railway line following the same route.

== History ==
The village first appears in surviving records in 1052 as Hoffen. Hof is a Germanic word denoting a farm, a homestead or a settlement.

The village coat of arms comes from the Trautwein family who founded Hof: the family died out in 1664. The story of Hof has been a turbulent one. In the fourteenth century there were two settlements: Hoven comprised a dozen farms and Buren just four houses. These were the property of "St Peter the Younger" in Strasbourg. However, in 1450 the villages were surrendered to the lords of Hohenbourg and Fleckenstein. Then from the end of the fifteenth century possession of these settlements passed into the hands of the Counts of Zweibrücken. During the seventeenth century Hoffen became attached to the bailiwick of Cleebourg. The Thirty Years War was devastating for many villages in Alsace, and in 1633 the hamlet of Buren disappeared following the passing of imperial catholic troops. There were further destructive wars for much of the eighteenth century, but 1748 probably marked the end of the most deadly of them all for Alsace. Many villages were left depopulated and were subsequently resettled by migrants from Switzerland, higher up the river Rhine or from other parts of France which emerged from the war in possession of most of the major towns and cities in Alsace, and controlled the whole province by the time of Louis XIV's death in 1715.

In September 1939, the population of Hoffen was evacuated to Haute Vienne as the government reluctantly planned for another territorial struggle with Germany.

In 1974 the former communes of Leiterswiller and Hermerswiller merged into the commune of Hoffen.

== See also ==
- Communes of the Bas-Rhin department
