= Quensel =

Quensel is a surname. Notable people with the surname include:

- Annie Quensel (1886 – 1933), Austrian and Swedish zoologist and writer
- Carl-Erik Quensel (1907–1977), Swedish statistician and demographer
- Conrad Quensel (1767-1806), Swedish naturalist
- Isa Quensel (1905-1981), Swedish actress and opera singer
- Nils Quensel (1894–1971), Swedish cabinet minister involved in the "Kejne affair"
- Percy D. Quensel (1881–1966), Swedish geologist

== See also ==
- Quensel Glacier, Cooper Bay, South Georgia
- Quesnel (disambiguation)
