= Bitumen =

Form of petroleum primarily used in road construction

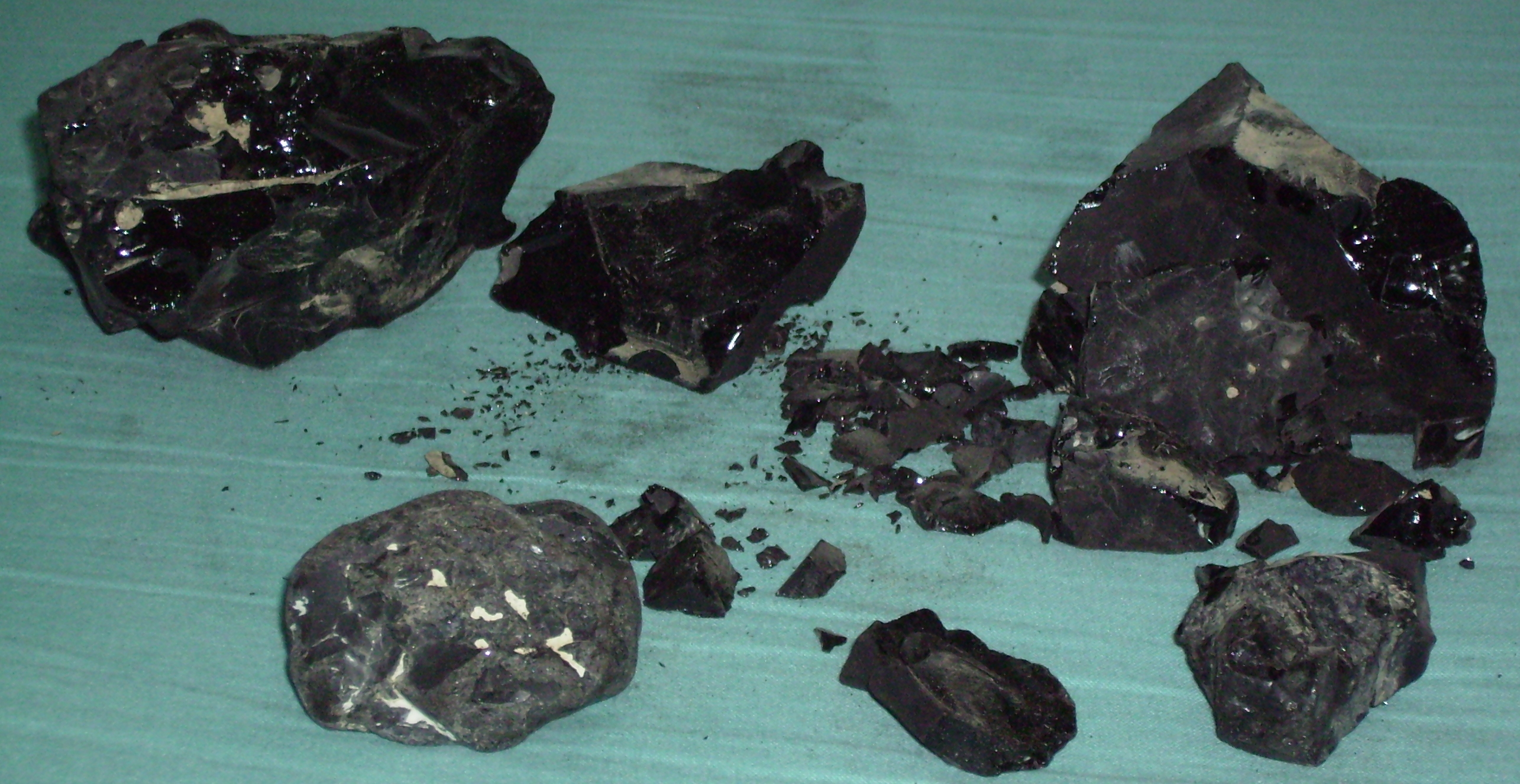
Natural bitumen from the Dead Sea

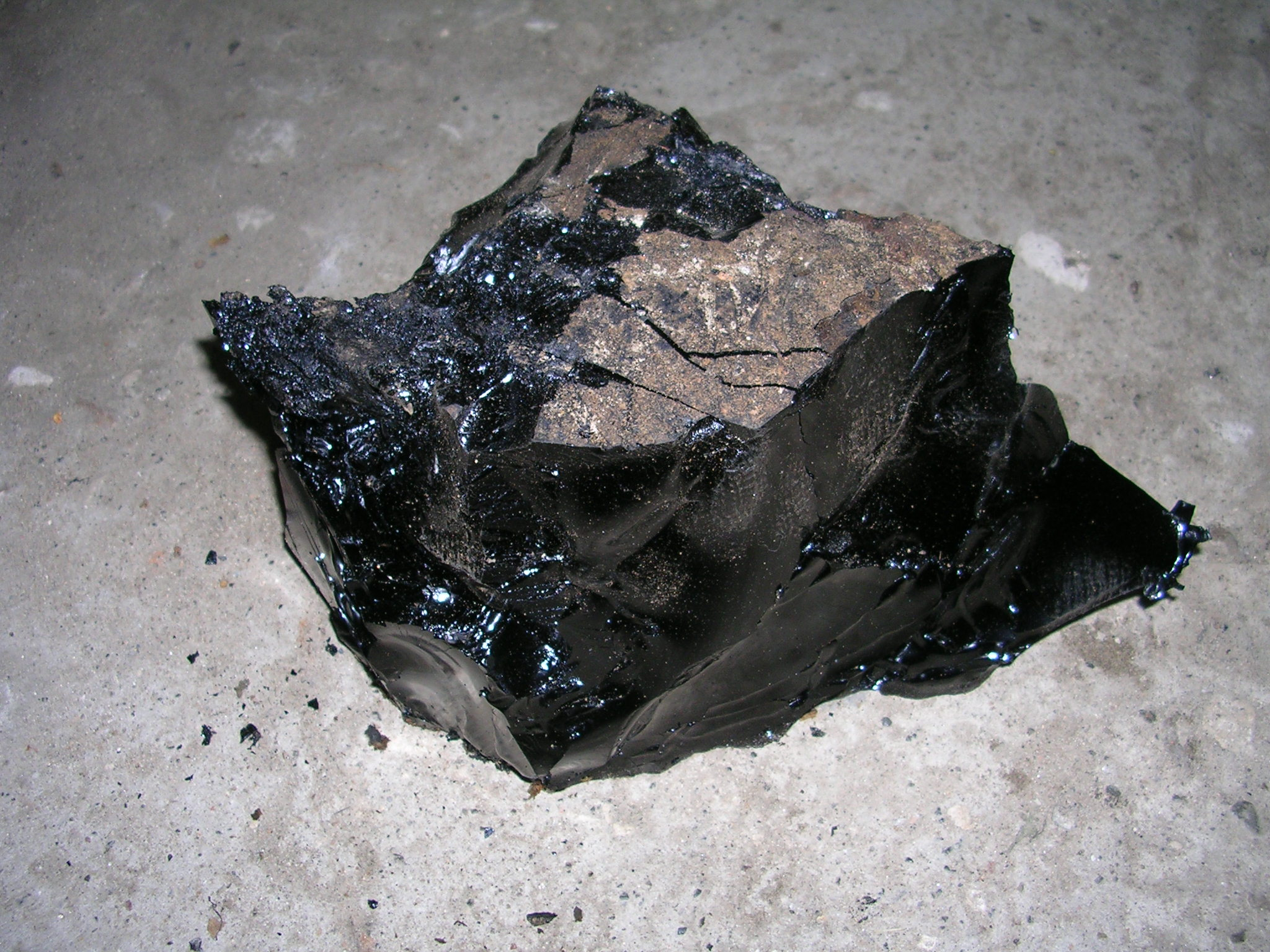
Refined bitumen

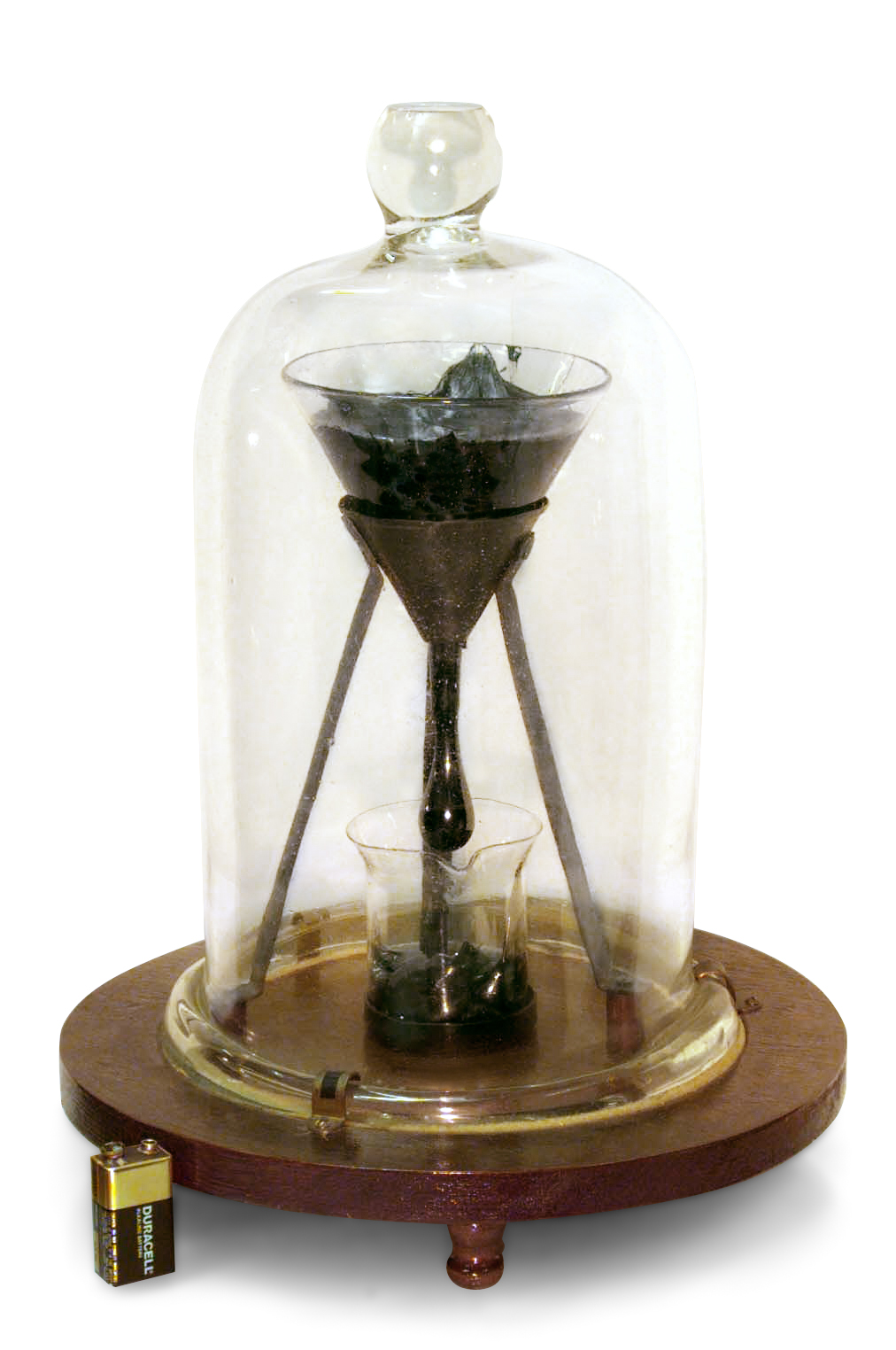
The University of Queensland pitch drop experiment, demonstrating the viscosity of bitumen

Bitumen (US: /bɪˈtuːmɪn, baɪ-/ bih-TOO-min, by-, UK: /ˈbɪtʃʊmɪn/ BIH-chuum-in) is an immensely viscous constituent of petroleum. Depending on its exact composition, it can be a sticky, black liquid or an apparently solid mass that behaves as a liquid over very large time scales. In American English, the material is commonly referred to as asphalt. Whether found in natural deposits or refined from petroleum, the substance is classed as a pitch. Prior to the 20th century, the term asphaltum was in general use. The word derives from the Ancient Greek word ἄσφαλτος (ásphaltos), which referred to natural bitumen or pitch. The largest natural deposit of bitumen in the world is the Pitch Lake of southwest Trinidad, which is estimated to contain 10 million tons.

About 70% of annual bitumen production is destined for road construction, its primary use. In this application, bitumen is used to bind aggregate particles, like gravel, and forms a substance referred to as asphalt concrete, which is colloquially termed asphalt. Its other main uses lie in bituminous waterproofing products, such as roofing felt and roof sealant.

In materials science and engineering, the terms asphalt and bitumen are often used interchangeably and refer to both natural and manufactured forms of the substance, although there is regional variation as to which term is most common. Worldwide, geologists tend to favor the term bitumen for the naturally occurring material. For the manufactured material, which is a refined residue from the distillation process of selected crude oils, bitumen is the prevalent term in much of the world; however, in American English, asphalt is more commonly used. To help avoid confusion, the terms "liquid asphalt", "asphalt binder", or "asphalt cement" are used in the U.S. to distinguish it from asphalt concrete. Colloquially, various forms of bitumen are sometimes referred to as tar, as in La Brea Tar Pits, although tar is not the same thing as bitumen.

Naturally occurring bitumen is sometimes specified by the term crude bitumen. Its viscosity is similar to that of cold molasses while the material obtained from the fractional distillation of crude oil boiling at 525 °C (977 °F) is sometimes referred to as refined bitumen. The Canadian province of Alberta has most of the world's reserves of natural bitumen in the Athabasca oil sands, which cover 142,000 square kilometres (55,000 sq mi), an area larger than England.

== Terminology ==
=== Etymology ===
The Latin word traces to the Proto-Indo-European root *gʷet- "pitch".

The word "asphalt" is derived from the late Middle English, in turn from French asphalte, based on Late Latin asphaltum, which is the latinisation of the Greek ἄσφαλτος (ásphaltos), a word meaning "asphalt/bitumen/pitch", which perhaps derives from ἀ-, "not, without", i.e. the alpha privative, and σφάλλειν (sphallein), "to cause to fall, baffle, (in passive) err, (in passive) be balked of".

The first use of asphalt by the ancients was as a cement to secure or join various objects, and it thus seems likely that the name itself was expressive of this application. Specifically, Herodotus mentioned that bitumen was brought to Babylon to build its gigantic fortification wall.

In French, the term asphalte is used for naturally occurring asphalt-soaked limestone deposits, and for specialised manufactured products with fewer voids or greater bitumen content than the "asphaltic concrete" used to pave roads.

=== Modern terminology ===
Bitumen mixed with clay was usually called "asphaltum", but the term is less commonly used today.

In American English, "asphalt" is equivalent to the British "bitumen". However, "asphalt" is also commonly used as a shortened form of "asphalt concrete" (therefore equivalent to the British "asphalt" or "tarmac").

In Canadian English, the word "bitumen" is used to refer to the vast Canadian deposits of extremely heavy crude oil, while "asphalt" is used for the oil refinery product. Diluted bitumen (diluted with naphtha to make it flow in pipelines) is known as "dilbit" in the Canadian petroleum industry, while bitumen "upgraded" to synthetic crude oil is known as "syncrude", and syncrude blended with bitumen is called "synbit".

"Bitumen" is still the preferred geological term for naturally occurring deposits of the solid or semi-solid form of petroleum. "Bituminous rock" is a form of sandstone impregnated with bitumen. The oil sands of Alberta, Canada are a similar material.

Neither of the terms "asphalt" or "bitumen" should be confused with tar or coal tars. Tar is the thick liquid product of the dry distillation and pyrolysis of organic hydrocarbons primarily sourced from vegetation masses, whether fossilized as with coal, or freshly harvested. The majority of bitumen, on the other hand, was formed naturally when vast quantities of organic animal materials were deposited by water and buried hundreds of metres deep at the diagenetic point, where the disorganized fatty hydrocarbon molecules joined in long chains in the absence of oxygen. Bitumen occurs as a solid or highly viscous liquid. It may even be mixed in with coal deposits. Bitumen, and coal using the Bergius process, can be refined into petrols such as gasoline, and bitumen may be distilled into tar, not the other way around.

== Composition ==
=== Normal composition ===
The components of bitumen include four main classes of compounds:

- Naphthene aromatics (naphthalene), consisting of partially hydrogenated polycyclic aromatic compounds
- Polar aromatics, consisting of high molecular weight phenols and carboxylic acids produced by partial oxidation of the material
- Saturated hydrocarbons; the percentage of saturated compounds in asphalt correlates with its softening point
- Asphaltenes, consisting of high molecular weight phenols and heterocyclic compounds

Bitumen typically contains, elementally 80% by weight of carbon; 10% hydrogen; up to 6% sulfur; and molecularly, between 5 and 25% by weight of asphaltenes dispersed in 90% to 65% maltenes. Most natural bitumens also contain organosulfur compounds, nickel and vanadium are found at <10 parts per million, as is typical of some petroleum. The substance is soluble in carbon disulfide. It is commonly modelled as a colloid, with asphaltenes as the dispersed phase and maltenes as the continuous phase. "It is almost impossible to separate and identify all the different molecules of bitumen, because the number of molecules with different chemical structure is extremely large".

Asphalt may be confused with coal tar, which is a visually similar black, thermoplastic material produced by the destructive distillation of coal. During the early and mid-20th century, when town gas was produced, coal tar was a readily available byproduct and extensively used as the binder for road aggregates. The addition of coal tar to macadam roads led to the word "tarmac", which is now used in common parlance to refer to road-making materials. However, since the 1970s, when natural gas succeeded town gas, bitumen has completely overtaken the use of coal tar in these applications. Other examples of this confusion include La Brea Tar Pits and the Canadian tar sands, both of which actually contain natural bitumen rather than tar. "Pitch" is another term sometimes informally used at times to refer to asphalt, as in Pitch Lake.

=== Additives, mixtures and contaminants ===
For economic and other reasons, bitumen is sometimes sold combined with other materials, often without being labeled as anything other than simply "bitumen".

Of particular note is the use of re-refined engine oil bottoms – "REOB" or "REOBs" – the residue of recycled automotive engine oil collected from the bottoms of re-refining vacuum distillation towers, in the manufacture of asphalt. REOB contains various elements and compounds found in recycled engine oil: additives to the original oil and materials accumulating from its circulation in the engine (typically iron and copper). Some research has indicated a correlation between this adulteration of bitumen and poorer-performing pavement.

== Occurrence ==
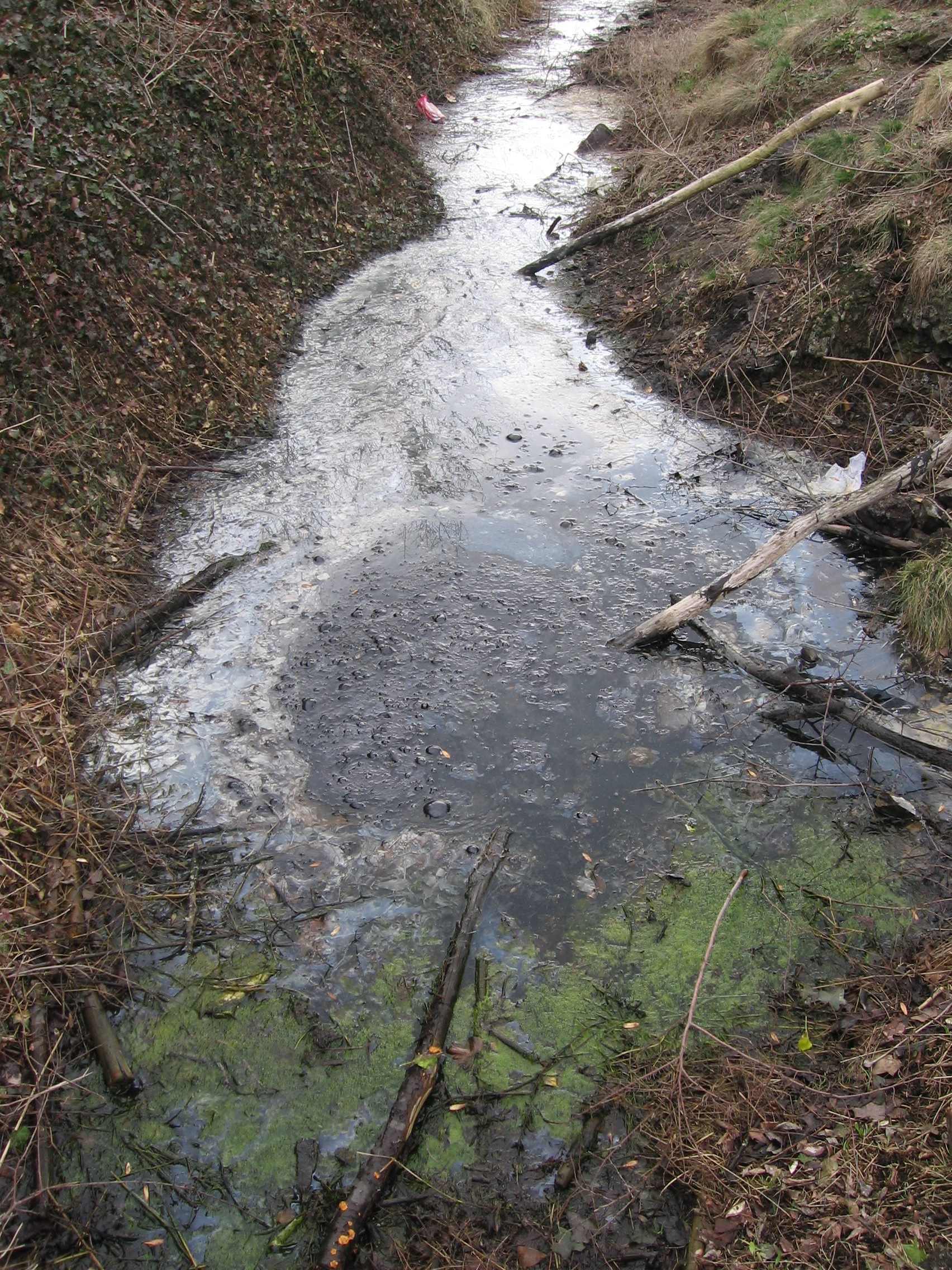
Bituminous outcrop of the Puy de la Poix, Clermont-Ferrand, France

The majority of bitumen used commercially is obtained from petroleum. Nonetheless, large amounts of bitumen occur in concentrated form in nature. Naturally occurring deposits of bitumen are formed from the remains of ancient, microscopic algae (diatoms) and other once-living things. These natural deposits of bitumen have been formed during the Carboniferous period, when giant swamp forests dominated many parts of the Earth. They were deposited in the mud on the bottom of the ocean or lake where the organisms lived. Under the heat (above 50 °C) and pressure of burial deep in the earth, the remains were transformed into materials such as bitumen, kerogen, or petroleum.

Natural deposits of bitumen include lakes such as the Pitch Lake in Trinidad and Tobago and Lake Bermudez in Venezuela. Natural seeps occur in the La Brea Tar Pits and the McKittrick Tar Pits in California, as well as in the Dead Sea.

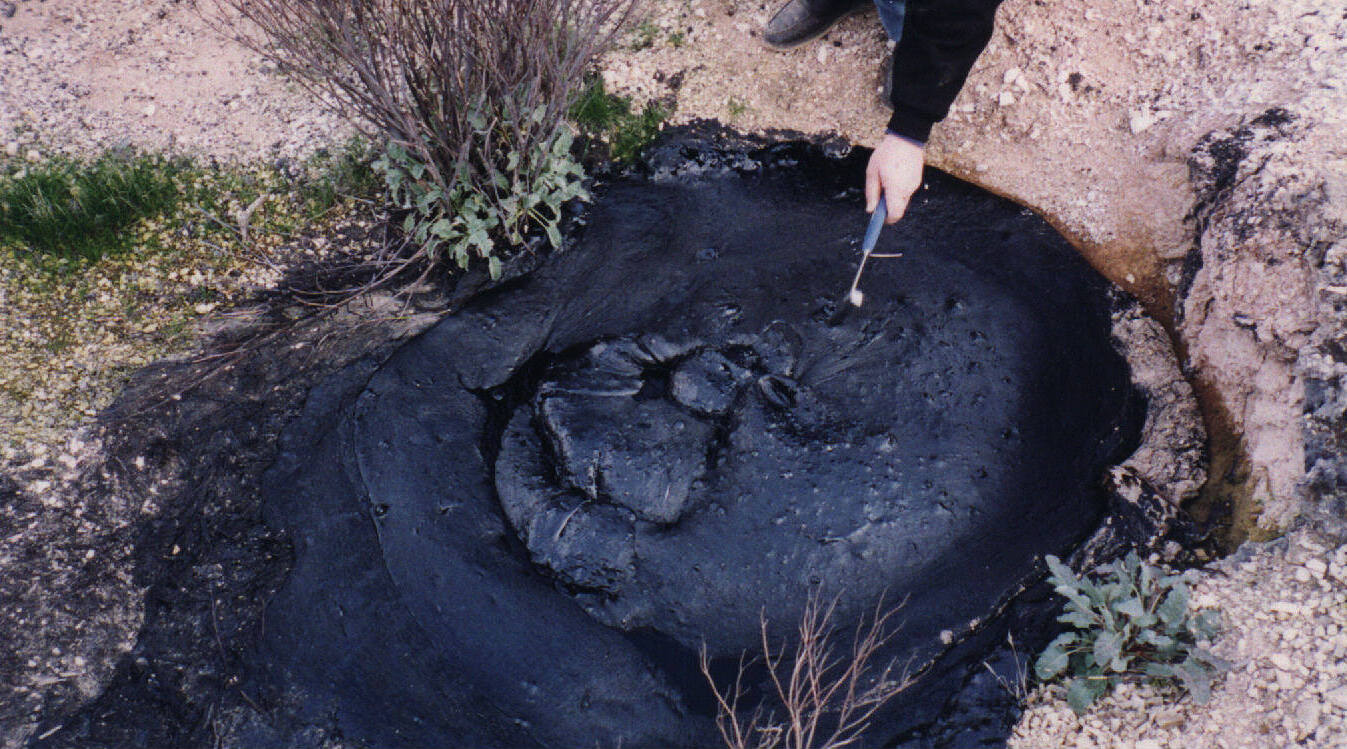
Tar seep at the McKittrick Tar Pits

Bitumen also occurs in unconsolidated sandstones known as "oil sands" in Alberta, Canada, and the similar "tar sands" in Utah, US. The Canadian province of Alberta has most of the world's reserves, in three huge deposits covering 142,000 square kilometres (55,000 sq mi), an area larger than England or New York state. These bituminous sands contain 166 billion barrels (26.4×10^{9} m^{3}) of commercially established oil reserves, giving Canada the third largest oil reserves in the world. Although historically it was used without refining to pave roads, nearly all of the output is now used as raw material for oil refineries in Canada and the United States.

The world's largest deposit of natural bitumen, known as the Athabasca oil sands, is located in the McMurray Formation of Northern Alberta. This formation is from the early Cretaceous, and is composed of numerous lenses of oil-bearing sand with up to 20% oil. Isotopic studies show the oil deposits to be about 110 million years old. Two smaller but still very large formations occur in the Peace River oil sands and the Cold Lake oil sands, to the west and southeast of the Athabasca oil sands, respectively. Of the Alberta deposits, only parts of the Athabasca oil sands are shallow enough to be suitable for surface mining. The other 80% has to be produced by oil wells using enhanced oil recovery techniques like steam-assisted gravity drainage.

Much smaller heavy oil or bitumen deposits also occur in the Uinta Basin in Utah, US. The Tar Sand Triangle deposit, for example, is roughly 6% bitumen.

Bitumen may occur in hydrothermal veins. An example of this is within the Uinta Basin of Utah, in the US, where there is a swarm of laterally and vertically extensive veins composed of a solid hydrocarbon termed Gilsonite. These veins formed by the polymerization and solidification of hydrocarbons that were mobilized from the deeper oil shales of the Green River Formation during burial and diagenesis.

Bitumen is similar to the organic matter in carbonaceous meteorites. However, detailed studies have shown these materials to be distinct. The vast Alberta bitumen resources are considered to have started out as living material from marine plants and animals, mainly algae, that died millions of years ago when an ancient ocean covered Alberta. They were covered by mud, buried deeply over time, and gently cooked into oil by geothermal heat at a temperature of 50 to 150 °C (120 to 300 °F). Due to pressure from the rising of the Rocky Mountains in southwestern Alberta, 80 to 55 million years ago, the oil was driven northeast hundreds of kilometres and trapped into underground sand deposits left behind by ancient river beds and ocean beaches, thus forming the oil sands.

== History ==
=== Paleolithic times ===
Bitumen use goes back to the Middle Paleolithic, where it was shaped into tool handles or used as an adhesive for attaching stone tools to hafts.

The earliest evidence of bitumen use was discovered when archeologists identified bitumen material on Levallois flint artefacts that date to about 71,000 years BP at the Umm el Tlel open-air site, located on the northern slope of the Qdeir Plateau in el Kowm Basin in Central Syria. Microscopic analyses found bituminous residue on two-thirds of the stone artefacts, suggesting that bitumen was an important and frequently used component of tool making for people in that region at that time. Geochemical analyses of the asphaltic residues places its source to localized natural bitumen outcroppings in the Bichri Massif, about 40 km northeast of the Umm el Tlel archeological site.

A re-examination of artifacts uncovered in 1908 at Le Moustier rock shelters in France has identified Mousterian stone tools that were attached to grips made of ochre and bitumen. The grips were formulated with 55% ground goethite ochre and 45% cooked liquid bitumen to create a moldable putty that hardened into handles. Earlier, less-careful excavations at Le Moustier prevent conclusive identification of the archaeological culture and age, but the European Mousterian style of these tools suggests they are associated with Neanderthals during the late Middle Paleolithic into the early Upper Paleolithic between 60,000 and 35,000 years before present. It is the earliest evidence of multicomponent adhesive in Europe.

=== Ancient times ===
The use of natural bitumen for waterproofing and as an adhesive dates at least to the fifth millennium BC, with a crop storage basket discovered in Mehrgarh, of the Indus Valley civilization, lined with it. By the 3rd millennium BC refined rock asphalt was in use in the region, and was used to waterproof the Great Bath in Mohenjo-daro.

In the ancient Near East, the Sumerians used natural bitumen deposits for mortar between bricks and stones, to cement parts of carvings, such as eyes, into place, for ship caulking, and for waterproofing. The Greek historian Herodotus said hot bitumen was used as mortar in the walls of Babylon.

The 1 kilometre (0.62 mi) long Euphrates Tunnel beneath the river Euphrates at Babylon in the time of Queen Semiramis (c. 800 BC) was reportedly constructed of burnt bricks covered with bitumen as a waterproofing agent.

Bitumen was used by ancient Egyptians to embalm mummies. The Persian word for asphalt is moom, which is related to the English word mummy. The Egyptians' primary source of bitumen was the Dead Sea, which the Romans knew as Palus Asphaltites (Asphalt Lake).

In approximately 40 AD, Dioscorides described the Dead Sea material as Judaicum bitumen, and noted other places in the region where it could be found. The Sidon bitumen is thought to refer to material found at Hasbeya in Lebanon. Pliny also refers to bitumen being found in Epirus. Bitumen was a valuable strategic resource. It was the object of the first known battle for a hydrocarbon deposit – between the Seleucids and the Nabateans in 312 BC.

In the ancient Far East, natural bitumen was slowly boiled to get rid of the higher fractions, leaving a thermoplastic material of higher molecular weight that, when layered on objects, became hard upon cooling. This was used to cover objects that needed waterproofing, such as scabbards and other items. Statuettes of household deities were also cast with this type of material in Japan, and probably also in China.

In North America, archaeological recovery has indicated that bitumen was sometimes used to adhere stone projectile points to wooden shafts. In Canada, aboriginal people used bitumen seeping out of the banks of the Athabasca and other rivers to waterproof birch bark canoes, and also heated it in smudge pots to ward off mosquitoes in the summer. Bitumen was also used to waterproof plank canoes used by indigenous peoples in pre-colonial southern California.

=== Continental Europe ===
In 1553, Pierre Belon described in his work Observations that pissasphalto, a mixture of pitch and bitumen, was used in the Republic of Ragusa (now Dubrovnik, Croatia) for tarring of ships.

An 1838 edition of Mechanics Magazine cites an early use of asphalt in France. A pamphlet dated 1621, by "a certain Monsieur d'Eyrinys, states that he had discovered the existence (of asphaltum) in large quantities in the vicinity of Neufchatel", and that he proposed to use it in a variety of ways – "principally in the construction of air-proof granaries, and in protecting, by means of the arches, the water-courses in the city of Paris from the intrusion of dirt and filth", which at that time made the water unusable. "He expatiates also on the excellence of this material for forming level and durable terraces" in palaces, "the notion of forming such terraces in the streets not one likely to cross the brain of a Parisian of that generation".

But the substance was generally neglected in France until the revolution of 1830. In the 1830s there was a surge of interest, and asphalt became widely used "for pavements, flat roofs, and the lining of cisterns, and in England, some use of it had been made of it for similar purposes". Its rise in Europe was "a sudden phenomenon", after natural deposits were found "in France at Osbann (Bas-Rhin), the Parc (Ain) and the Puy-de-la-Poix (Puy-de-Dôme)", although it could also be made artificially. One of the earliest uses in France was the laying of about 24,000 square yards of Seyssel asphalt at the Place de la Concorde in 1835.

=== United Kingdom ===
Among the earlier uses of bitumen in the United Kingdom was for etching. William Salmon's Polygraphice (1673) provides a recipe for varnish used in etching, consisting of three ounces of virgin wax, two ounces of mastic, and one ounce of asphaltum. By the fifth edition in 1685, he had included more asphaltum recipes from other sources.

The first British patent for the use of asphalt was "Cassell's patent asphalte or bitumen" in 1834. Then on 25 November 1837, Richard Tappin Claridge patented the use of Seyssel asphalt (patent #7849), for use in asphalte pavement, having seen it employed in France and Belgium when visiting with Frederick Walter Simms, who worked with him on the introduction of asphalt to Britain. Dr T. Lamb Phipson writes that his father, Samuel Ryland Phipson, a friend of Claridge, was also "instrumental in introducing the asphalte pavement (in 1836)".

Claridge obtained a patent in Scotland on 27 March 1838, and obtained a patent in Ireland on 23 April 1838. In 1851, extensions for the 1837 patent and for both 1838 patents were sought by the trustees of a company previously formed by Claridge. Claridge's Patent Asphalte Company – formed in 1838 for the purpose of introducing to Britain "Asphalte in its natural state from the mine at Pyrimont Seysell in France", – "laid one of the first asphalt pavements in Whitehall". Trials were made of the pavement in 1838 on the footway in Whitehall, the stable at Knightsbridge Barracks, "and subsequently on the space at the bottom of the steps leading from Waterloo Place to St. James Park". "The formation in 1838 of Claridge's Patent Asphalte Company (with a distinguished list of aristocratic patrons, and Marc and Isambard Brunel as, respectively, a trustee and consulting engineer), gave an enormous impetus to the development of a British asphalt industry". "By the end of 1838, at least two other companies, Robinson's and the Bastenne company, were in production", with asphalt being laid as paving at Brighton, Herne Bay, Canterbury, Kensington, the Strand, and a large floor area in Bunhill-row, while meantime Claridge's Whitehall paving "continue(d) in good order". The Bonnington Chemical Works manufactured asphalt using coal tar and by 1839 had installed it in Bonnington.

In 1838, there was a flurry of entrepreneurial activity involving bitumen, which had uses beyond paving. For example, bitumen could also be used for flooring, damp proofing in buildings, and for waterproofing of various types of pools and baths, both of which were also proliferating in the 19th century. One of the earliest surviving examples of its use can be seen at Highgate Cemetery where it was used in 1839 to seal the roof of the terrace catacombs. On the London stockmarket, there were various claims as to the exclusivity of bitumen quality from France, Germany and England. And numerous patents were granted in France, with similar numbers of patent applications being denied in England due to their similarity to each other. In England, "Claridge's was the type most used in the 1840s and 50s".

In 1914, Claridge's Company entered into a joint venture to produce tar-bound macadam, with materials manufactured through a subsidiary company called Clarmac Roads Ltd. Two products resulted, namely Clarmac, and Clarphalte, with the former being manufactured by Clarmac Roads and the latter by Claridge's Patent Asphalte Co., although Clarmac was more widely used. (Note: The Building News and Engineering Journal contains photographs of the following roads where Clarmac was used, being "some amongst many laid with 'Clarmac'": Scott's Lane, Beckenham; Dorset Street, Marylebone; Lordswood Road, Birmingham; Hearsall Lane, Coventry; Valkyrie Avenue, Westcliff-on-Sea; and Lennard Road, Penge.) However, the First World War ruined the Clarmac Company, which entered into liquidation in 1915. The failure of Clarmac Roads Ltd had a flow-on effect to Claridge's Company, which was itself compulsorily wound up, ceasing operations in 1917, having invested a substantial amount of funds into the new venture, both at the outset and in a subsequent attempt to save the Clarmac Company.

Bitumen was thought in 19th century Britain to contain chemicals with medicinal properties. Extracts from bitumen were used to treat catarrh and some forms of asthma and as a remedy against worms, especially the tapeworm.

=== United States ===
The first use of bitumen in the New World was by aboriginal peoples. On the west coast, as early as the 13th century, the Tongva, Luiseño and Chumash peoples collected the naturally occurring bitumen that seeped to the surface above underlying petroleum deposits. All three groups used the substance as an adhesive. It is found on many different artifacts of tools and ceremonial items. For example, it was used on rattles to adhere gourds or turtle shells to rattle handles. It was also used in decorations. Small round shell beads were often set in asphaltum to provide decorations. It was used as a sealant on baskets to make them watertight for carrying water, possibly poisoning those who drank the water. Asphalt was used also to seal the planks on ocean-going canoes.

Asphalt was first used to pave streets in the 1870s. At first naturally occurring "bituminous rock" was used, such as at Ritchie Mines in Macfarlan in Ritchie County, West Virginia from 1852 to 1873. In 1876, asphalt-based paving was used to pave Pennsylvania Avenue in Washington DC, in time for the celebration of the national centennial.

In the horse-drawn era, US streets were mostly unpaved and covered with dirt or gravel. Especially where mud or trenching often made streets difficult to pass, pavements were sometimes made of diverse materials including wooden planks, cobble stones or other stone blocks, or bricks. Unpaved roads produced uneven wear and hazards for pedestrians. In the late 19th century with the rise of the popular bicycle, bicycle clubs were important in pushing for more general pavement of streets. Advocacy for pavement increased in the early 20th century with the rise of the automobile. Asphalt gradually became an ever more common method of paving. St. Charles Avenue in New Orleans was paved its whole length with asphalt by 1889.

In 1900, Manhattan alone had 130,000 horses, pulling streetcars, wagons, and carriages, and leaving their waste behind. They were not fast, and pedestrians could dodge and scramble their way across the crowded streets. Small towns continued to rely on dirt and gravel, but larger cities wanted much better streets. They looked to wood or granite blocks by the 1850s. In 1890, a third of Chicago's 2000 miles of streets were paved, chiefly with wooden blocks, which gave better traction than mud. Brick surfacing was a good compromise, but even better was asphalt paving, which was easy to install and to cut through to get at sewers. With London and Paris serving as models, Washington laid 400,000 square yards of asphalt paving by 1882; it became the model for Buffalo, Philadelphia and elsewhere. By the end of the century, American cities boasted 30 million square yards of asphalt paving, well ahead of brick. The streets became faster and more dangerous so electric traffic lights were installed. Electric trolleys (at 12 miles per hour) became the main transportation service for middle class shoppers and office workers until they bought automobiles after 1945 and commuted from more distant suburbs in privacy and comfort on asphalt highways.

=== Canada ===
Canada has the world's largest deposit of natural bitumen in the Athabasca oil sands, and Canadian First Nations along the Athabasca River had long used it to waterproof their canoes. In 1719, a Cree named Wa-Pa-Su brought a sample for trade to Henry Kelsey of the Hudson's Bay Company, who was the first recorded European to see it. However, it wasn't until 1787 that fur trader and explorer Alexander MacKenzie saw the Athabasca oil sands and said, "At about 24 miles [39 km] from the fork (of the Athabasca and Clearwater Rivers) are some bituminous fountains into which a pole of 20 feet [6.1 m] long may be inserted without the least resistance."

The value of the deposit was obvious from the start, but the means of extracting the bitumen was not. The nearest town, Fort McMurray, Alberta, was a small fur trading post, other markets were far away, and transportation costs were too high to ship the raw bituminous sand for paving. In 1915, Sidney Ells of the Federal Mines Branch experimented with separation techniques and used the product to pave 600 feet (180 m) of road in Edmonton, Alberta. Other roads in Alberta were paved with material extracted from oil sands, but it was generally not economic. During the 1920s Dr. Karl A. Clark of the Alberta Research Council patented a hot water oil separation process and entrepreneur Robert C. Fitzsimmons built the Bitumount oil separation plant, which between 1925 and 1958 produced up to 300 barrels (50 m^{3}) per day of bitumen using Dr. Clark's method. Most of the bitumen was used for waterproofing roofs, but other uses included fuels, lubrication oils, printers ink, medicines, rust- and acid-proof paints, fireproof roofing, street paving, patent leather, and fence post preservatives. Eventually Fitzsimmons ran out of money and the plant was taken over by the Alberta government. Today the Bitumount plant is a Provincial Historic Site.

=== Photography and art ===
Bitumen was used in early photographic technology. In 1826, or 1827, it was used by French scientist Joseph Nicéphore Niépce to make the oldest surviving photograph from nature. The bitumen was thinly coated onto a pewter plate which was then exposed in a camera. Exposure to light hardened the bitumen and made it insoluble, so that when it was subsequently rinsed with a solvent only the sufficiently light-struck areas remained. Many hours of exposure in the camera were required, making bitumen impractical for ordinary photography, but from the 1850s to the 1920s it was in common use as a photoresist in the production of printing plates for various photomechanical printing processes.

Bitumen was the nemesis of many artists during the 19th century. Although widely used for a time, it ultimately proved unstable for use in oil painting, especially when mixed with the most common diluents, such as linseed oil, varnish and turpentine. Unless thoroughly diluted, bitumen never fully solidifies and will in time corrupt the other pigments with which it comes into contact. The use of bitumen as a glaze to set in shadow or mixed with other colors to render a darker tone resulted in the eventual deterioration of many paintings, for instance those of Delacroix. Perhaps the most famous example of the destructiveness of bitumen is Théodore Géricault's Raft of the Medusa (1818–1819), where his use of bitumen caused the brilliant colors to degenerate into dark greens and blacks and the paint and canvas to buckle.

== Modern use ==
=== Global use ===
The vast majority of refined bitumen is used in construction: primarily as a constituent of products used in paving and roofing applications. According to the requirements of the end use, bitumen is produced to specification. This is achieved either by refining or blending. It is estimated that the current world use of bitumen is approximately 102 million tonnes per year. Approximately 85% of all the bitumen produced is used as the binder in asphalt concrete for roads. It is also used in other paved areas such as airport runways, car parks and footways. Typically, the production of asphalt concrete involves mixing fine and coarse aggregates such as sand, gravel and crushed rock with asphalt, which acts as the binding agent. Other materials, such as recycled polymers (e.g., rubber tyres), may be added to the bitumen to modify its properties according to the application for which the bitumen is ultimately intended.

A further 10% of global bitumen production is used in roofing applications, where its waterproofing qualities are invaluable. The remaining 5% of bitumen is used mainly for sealing and insulating purposes in a variety of building materials, such as pipe coatings, carpet tile backing and paint. Bitumen is applied in the construction and maintenance of many structures, systems, and components, such as:

- Highways
- Airport runways
- Footways and pedestrian ways
- Car parks
- Racetracks
- Tennis courts
- Roofing
- Damp proofing
- Dams
- Reservoir and pool linings
- Soundproofing
- Pipe coatings
- Cable coatings
- Paints
- Building water proofing
- Tile underlying waterproofing
- Newspaper ink production

=== Rolled asphalt concrete ===
The largest use of bitumen is for making asphalt concrete for road surfaces; this accounts for approximately 85% of the bitumen consumed in the United States. There are about 4,000 asphalt concrete mixing plants in the US, and a similar number in Europe.

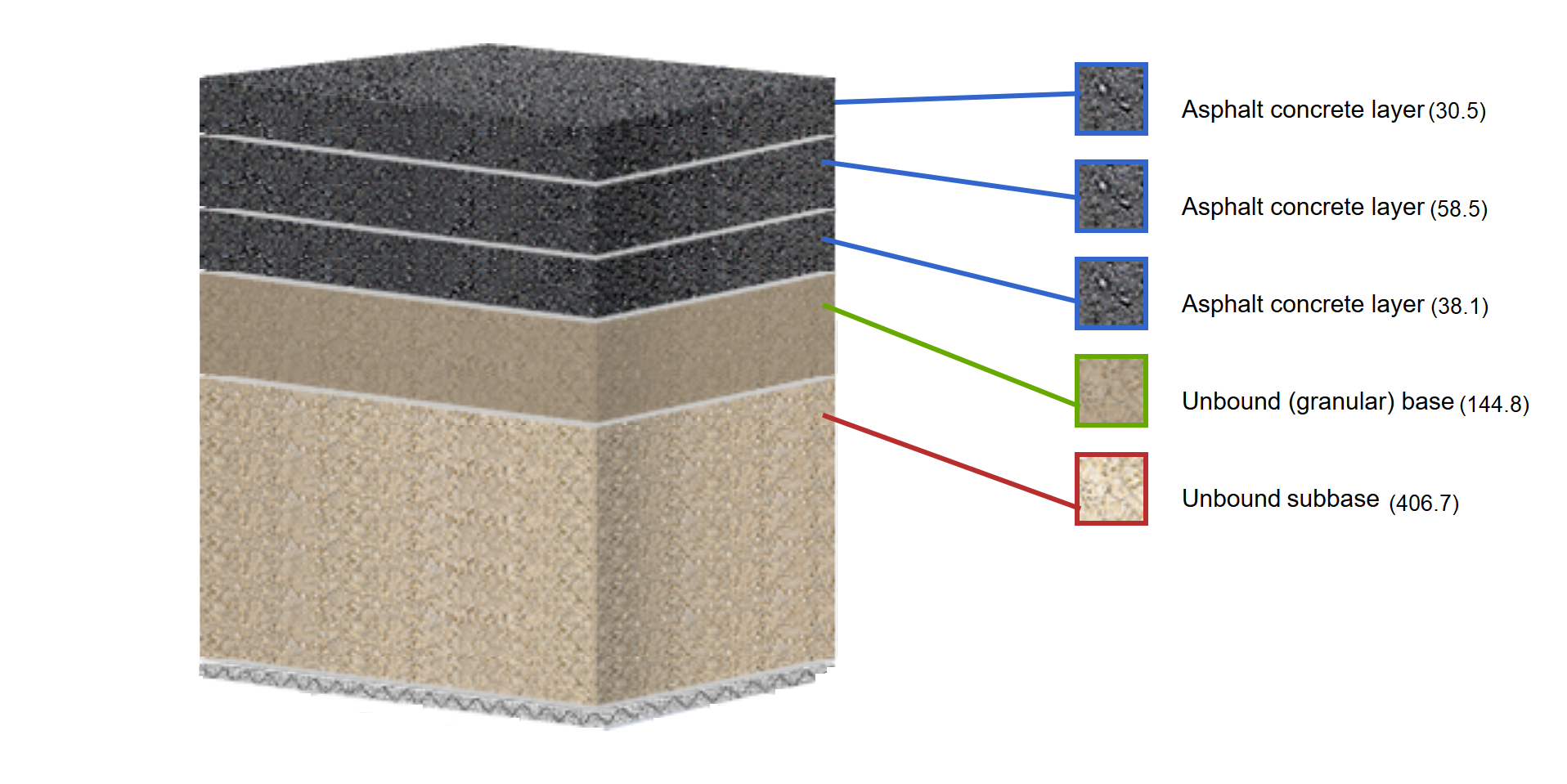
Asphalt concrete is usually placed on top in a road.

Asphalt concrete pavement mixes are typically composed of 5% bitumen (known as asphalt cement in the US) and 95% aggregates (stone, sand, and gravel). Due to its highly viscous nature, bitumen must be heated so it can be mixed with the aggregates at the asphalt mixing facility. The temperature required varies depending upon characteristics of the bitumen and the aggregates, but warm-mix asphalt technologies allow producers to reduce the temperature required.

The weight of an asphalt pavement depends upon the aggregate type, the bitumen, and the air void content. An average example in the United States is about 112 pounds per square yard, per inch of pavement thickness.

When maintenance is performed on asphalt pavements, such as milling to remove a worn or damaged surface, the removed material can be returned to a facility for processing into new pavement mixtures. The bitumen in the removed material can be reactivated and put back to use in new pavement mixes. With some 95% of paved roads being constructed of or surfaced with asphalt, a substantial amount of asphalt pavement material is reclaimed each year. According to industry surveys conducted annually by the Federal Highway Administration and the National Asphalt Pavement Association, more than 99% of the bitumen removed each year from road surfaces during widening and resurfacing projects is reused as part of new pavements, roadbeds, shoulders and embankments or stockpiled for future use.

Asphalt concrete paving is widely used in airports around the world. Due to the sturdiness and ability to be repaired quickly, it is widely used for runways.

=== Mastic asphalt ===
Mastic asphalt is a type of asphalt that differs from dense graded asphalt (asphalt concrete) in that it has a higher bitumen (binder) content, usually around 7–10% of the whole aggregate mix, as opposed to rolled asphalt concrete, which has only around 5% asphalt. This thermoplastic substance is widely used in the building industry for waterproofing flat roofs and tanking underground. Mastic asphalt is heated to a temperature of 210 °C (410 °F) and is spread in layers to form an impervious barrier about 20 millimeters (0.8 inches) thick.

=== Bitumen emulsion ===
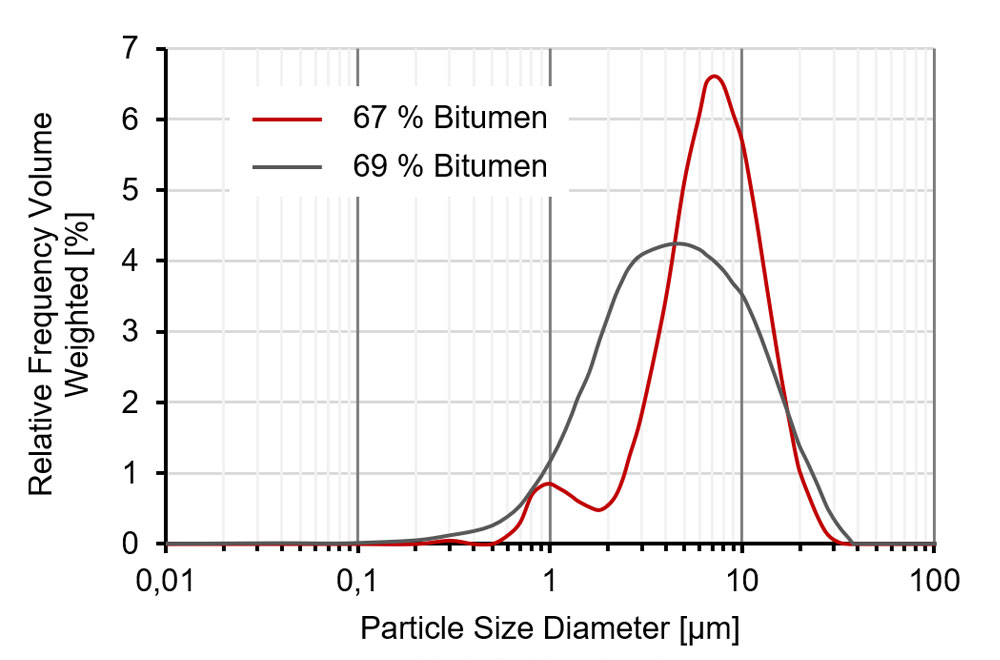
Volume-weighted particle size distribution of 2 different asphalt emulsions determined by laser diffraction

Bitumen emulsions are colloidal mixtures of bitumen and water. Due to the different surface tensions of the two liquids, stable emulsions cannot be created simply by mixing. Therefore, various emulsifiers and stabilizers are added. Emulsifiers are amphiphilic molecules that differ in the charge of their polar head group. They reduce the surface tension of the emulsion and thus prevent bitumen particles from fusing. The emulsifier charge defines the type of emulsion: anionic (negatively charged) and cationic (positively charged). The concentration of an emulsifier is a critical parameter affecting the size of the bitumen particles—higher concentrations lead to smaller bitumen particles. Thus, emulsifiers have a great impact on the stability, viscosity, breaking strength, and adhesion of the bitumen emulsion. The size of bitumen particles is usually between 0.1 and 50 μm with a main fraction between 1 μm and 10 μm. Laser diffraction techniques can be used to determine the particle size distribution quickly and easily. Cationic emulsifiers primarily include long-chain amines such as imidazolines, amido-amines, and diamines, which acquire a positive charge when an acid is added. Anionic emulsifiers are often fatty acids extracted from lignin, tall oil, or tree resin saponified with bases such as NaOH, which creates a negative charge.

During the storage of bitumen emulsions, bitumen particles sediment, agglomerate (flocculation), or fuse (coagulation), which leads to a certain instability of the bitumen emulsion. How fast this process occurs depends on the formulation of the bitumen emulsion but also storage conditions such as temperature and humidity. When emulsified bitumen gets into contact with aggregates, emulsifiers lose their effectiveness, the emulsion breaks down, and an adhering bitumen film is formed referred to as 'breaking'. Bitumen particles almost instantly create a continuous bitumen film by coagulating and separating from water which evaporates. Not each asphalt emulsion reacts as fast as the other when it gets into contact with aggregates. That enables a classification into Rapid-setting (R), Slow-setting (SS), and Medium-setting (MS) emulsions, but also an individual, application-specific optimization of the formulation and a wide field of application (1). For example, Slow-breaking emulsions ensure a longer processing time which is particularly advantageous for fine aggregates (1).

Adhesion problems are reported for anionic emulsions in contact with quartz-rich aggregates. They are substituted by cationic emulsions achieving better adhesion. The extensive range of bitumen emulsions is covered insufficiently by standardization. DIN EN 13808 for cationic asphalt emulsions has been existing since July 2005. Here, a classification of bitumen emulsions based on letters and numbers is described, considering charges, viscosities, and the type of bitumen. The production process of bitumen emulsions is very complex. Two methods are commonly used, the "Colloid mill" method and the "High Internal Phase Ratio (HIPR)" method. In the "Colloid mill" method, a rotor moves at high speed within a stator by adding bitumen and a water-emulsifier mixture. The resulting shear forces generate bitumen particles between 5 μm and 10 μm coated with emulsifiers. The "High Internal Phase Ratio (HIPR)" method is used for creating smaller bitumen particles, monomodal, narrow particle size distributions, and very high bitumen concentrations. Here, a highly concentrated bitumen emulsion is produced first by moderate stirring and diluted afterward. In contrast to the "Colloid-Mill" method, the aqueous phase is introduced into hot bitumen, enabling very high bitumen concentrations.

T The "High Internal Phase Ratio (HIPR)" method is used for creating smaller bitumen particles, monomodal, narrow particle size distributions, and very high bitumen concentrations. Here, a highly concentrated bitumen emulsion is produced first by moderate stirring and diluted afterward. In contrast to the "Colloid-Mill" method, the aqueous phase is introduced into hot bitumen, enabling very high bitumen concentrations (1).he "High Internal Phase Ratio (HIPR)" method is used for creating smaller bitumen particles, monomodal, narrow particle size distributions, and very high bitumen concentrations. Here, a highly concentrated bitumen emulsion is produced first by moderate stirring and diluted afterward. In contrast to the "Colloid-Mill" method, the aqueous phase is introduced into hot bitumen, enabling very high bitumen concentrations (1).

Bitumen emulsions are used in a wide variety of applications. They are used in road construction and building protection and primarily include the application in cold recycling mixtures, adhesive coating, and surface treatment (1). Due to the lower viscosity in comparison to hot bitumen, processing requires less energy and is associated with significantly less risk of fire and burns. Chipseal involves spraying the road surface with bitumen emulsion followed by a layer of crushed rock, gravel or crushed slag. Slurry seal is a mixture of bitumen emulsion and fine crushed aggregate that is spread on the surface of a road. Cold-mixed asphalt can also be made from bitumen emulsion to create pavements similar to hot-mixed asphalt, several inches in depth, and bitumen emulsions are also blended into recycled hot-mix asphalt to create low-cost pavements. Bitumen emulsion based techniques are known to be useful for all classes of roads, their use may also be possible in the following applications: 1. Asphalts for heavily trafficked roads (based on the use of polymer modified emulsions) 2. Warm emulsion based mixtures, to improve both their maturation time and mechanical properties 3. Half-warm technology, in which aggregates are heated up to 100 degrees, producing mixtures with similar properties to those of hot asphalts 4. High performance surface dressing.

=== Synthetic crude oil ===
Synthetic crude oil, also known as syncrude, is the output from a bitumen upgrader facility used in connection with oil sand production in Canada. Bituminous sands are mined using enormous (100-ton capacity) power shovels and loaded into even larger (400-ton capacity) dump trucks for movement to an upgrading facility. The process used to extract the bitumen from the sand is a hot water process originally developed by Dr. Karl Clark of the University of Alberta during the 1920s. After extraction from the sand, the bitumen is fed into a bitumen upgrader which converts it into a light crude oil equivalent. This synthetic substance is fluid enough to be transferred through conventional oil pipelines and can be fed into conventional oil refineries without any further treatment. By 2015 Canadian bitumen upgraders were producing over 1 million barrels (160×10^{3} m^{3}) per day of synthetic crude oil, of which 75% was exported to oil refineries in the United States.

In Alberta, five bitumen upgraders produce synthetic crude oil and a variety of other products: The Suncor Energy upgrader near Fort McMurray, Alberta produces synthetic crude oil plus diesel fuel; the Syncrude Canada, Canadian Natural Resources, and Nexen upgraders near Fort McMurray produce synthetic crude oil; and the Shell Scotford Upgrader near Edmonton produces synthetic crude oil plus an intermediate feedstock for the nearby Shell Oil Refinery. A sixth upgrader, under construction in 2015 near Redwater, Alberta, will upgrade half of its crude bitumen directly to diesel fuel, with the remainder of the output being sold as feedstock to nearby oil refineries and petrochemical plants.

=== Non-upgraded crude bitumen ===
Canadian bitumen does not differ substantially from oils such as Venezuelan extra-heavy and Mexican heavy oil in chemical composition, and the real difficulty is moving the extremely viscous bitumen through oil pipelines to the refinery. Many modern oil refineries are extremely sophisticated and can process non-upgraded bitumen directly into products such as gasoline, diesel fuel, and refined asphalt without any preprocessing. This is particularly common in areas such as the US Gulf coast, where refineries were designed to process Venezuelan and Mexican oil, and in areas such as the US Midwest where refineries were rebuilt to process heavy oil as domestic light oil production declined. Given the choice, such heavy oil refineries usually prefer to buy bitumen rather than synthetic oil because the cost is lower, and in some cases because they prefer to produce more diesel fuel and less gasoline. By 2015 Canadian production and exports of non-upgraded bitumen exceeded that of synthetic crude oil at over 1.3 million barrels (210×10^{3} m^{3}) per day, of which about 65% was exported to the United States.

Because of the difficulty of moving crude bitumen through pipelines, non-upgraded bitumen is usually diluted with natural-gas condensate in a form called dilbit or with synthetic crude oil, called synbit. However, to meet international competition, much non-upgraded bitumen is now sold as a blend of multiple grades of bitumen, conventional crude oil, synthetic crude oil, and condensate in a standardized benchmark product such as Western Canadian Select. This sour, heavy crude oil blend is designed to have uniform refining characteristics to compete with internationally marketed heavy oils such as Mexican Mayan or Arabian Dubai Crude.

=== Radioactive waste encapsulation matrix ===
Bitumen was used starting in the 1960s as a hydrophobic matrix aiming to encapsulate radioactive waste such as medium-activity salts (mainly soluble sodium nitrate and sodium sulfate) produced by the reprocessing of spent nuclear fuels or radioactive sludges from sedimentation ponds. Bituminised radioactive waste containing highly radiotoxic alpha-emitting transuranic elements from nuclear reprocessing plants have been produced at industrial scale in France, Belgium and Japan, but this type of waste conditioning has been abandoned because operational safety issues (risks of fire, as occurred in a bituminisation plant at Tokai Works in Japan) and long-term stability problems related to their geological disposal in deep rock formations. One of the main problems is the swelling of bitumen exposed to radiation and to water. Bitumen swelling is first induced by radiation because of the presence of hydrogen gas bubbles generated by alpha and gamma radiolysis. A second mechanism is the matrix swelling when the encapsulated hygroscopic salts exposed to water or moisture start to rehydrate and to dissolve. The high concentration of salt in the pore solution inside the bituminised matrix is then responsible for osmotic effects inside the bituminised matrix. The water moves in the direction of the concentrated salts, the bitumen acting as a semi-permeable membrane. This also causes the matrix to swell. The swelling pressure due to osmotic effect under constant volume can be as high as 200 bar. If not properly managed, this high pressure can cause fractures in the near field of a disposal gallery of bituminised medium-level waste. When the bituminised matrix has been altered by swelling, encapsulated radionuclides are easily leached by the contact of ground water and released in the geosphere. The high ionic strength of the concentrated saline solution also favours the migration of radionuclides in clay host rocks. The presence of chemically reactive nitrate can also affect the redox conditions prevailing in the host rock by establishing oxidizing conditions, preventing the reduction of redox-sensitive radionuclides. Under their higher valences, radionuclides of elements such as selenium, technetium, uranium, neptunium and plutonium have a higher solubility and are also often present in water as non-retarded anions. This makes the disposal of medium-level bituminised waste very challenging.

Different types of bitumen have been used: blown bitumen (partly oxidized with air oxygen at high temperature after distillation, and harder) and direct distillation bitumen (softer). Blown bitumens like Mexphalte, with a high content of saturated hydrocarbons, are more easily biodegraded by microorganisms than direct distillation bitumen, with a low content of saturated hydrocarbons and a high content of aromatic hydrocarbons.

Concrete encapsulation of radwaste is presently considered a safer alternative by the nuclear industry and the waste management organisations.

=== Other uses ===
Roofing shingles and roll roofing account for most of the remaining bitumen consumption. Other uses include cattle sprays, fence-post treatments, and waterproofing for fabrics. Bitumen is used to make Japan black, a lacquer known especially for its use on iron and steel, and it is also used in paint and marker inks by some exterior paint supply companies to increase the weather resistance and permanence of the paint or ink, and to make the color darker. Bitumen is also used to seal some alkaline batteries during the manufacturing process. Bitumen is also commonly used as a ground in the etching process of intaglio printmaking.

Bitumen is frequently utilized as a material in the sound-dampening systems of dishwashers.

== Production ==
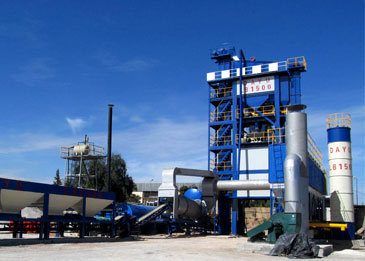
Typical asphalt plant for making asphalt

About 164,000,000 tons were produced in 2019. It is obtained as the "heavy" (i.e., difficult to distill) fraction. Material with a boiling point greater than around 500 °C is considered asphalt. Vacuum distillation separates it from the other components in crude oil (such as naphtha, gasoline, and diesel). The resulting material is typically further treated to extract small but valuable amounts of lubricants and to adjust the properties of the material to suit applications. In a de-asphalting unit, the crude bitumen is treated with either propane or butane in a supercritical phase to extract the lighter molecules, which are then separated. Further processing is possible by "blowing" the product: namely reacting it with oxygen. This step makes the product harder and more viscous.

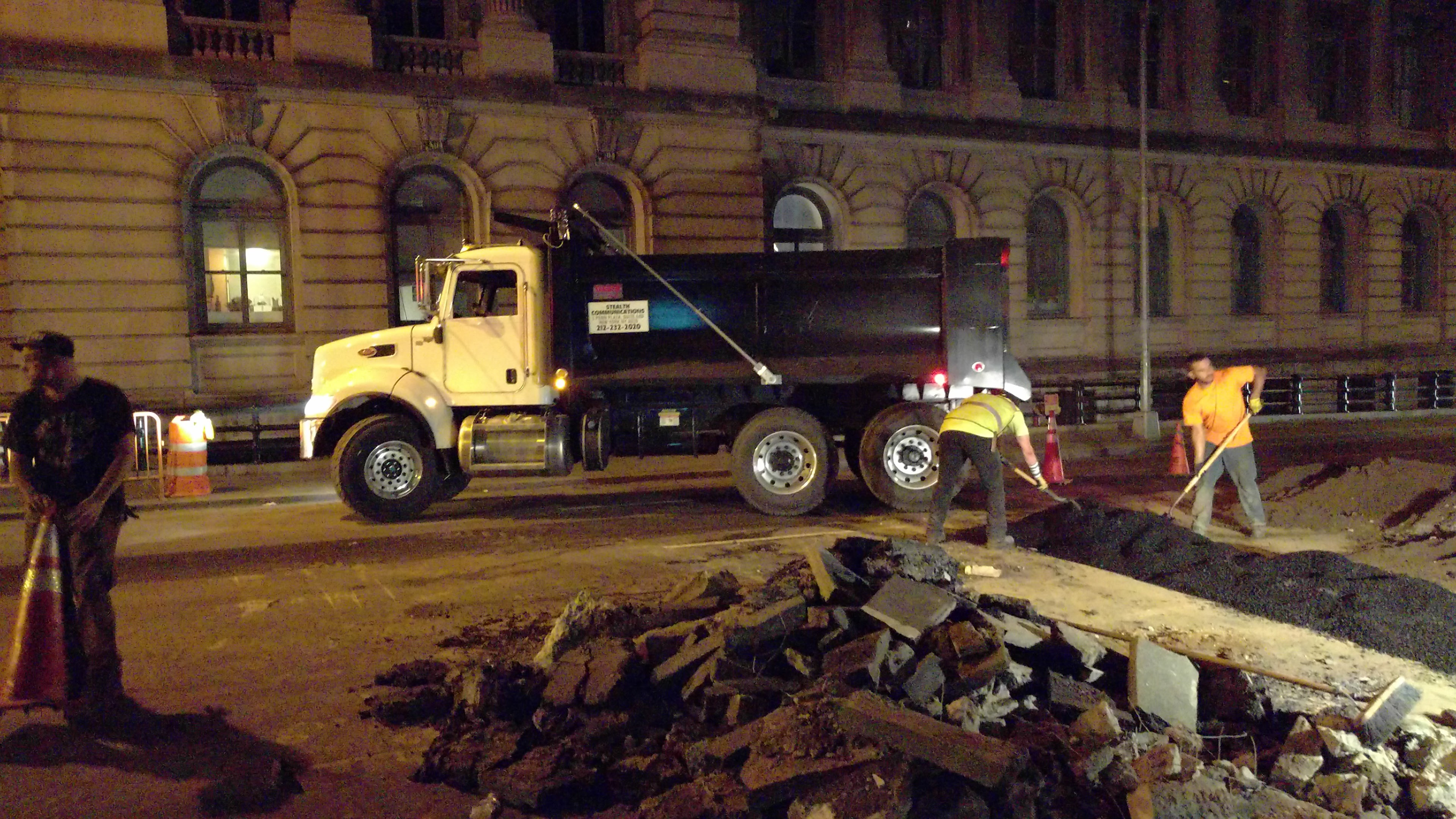
NYC Internet Provider, Stealth Communications, laying down asphalt over fiber-optic trench

Bitumen is typically stored and transported at temperatures around 150 °C (302 °F). Sometimes diesel oil or kerosene are mixed in before shipping to retain liquidity; upon delivery, these lighter materials are separated out of the mixture. This mixture is often called "bitumen feedstock", or BFS. Some dump trucks route the hot engine exhaust through pipes in the dump body to keep the material warm. The backs of tippers carrying asphalt, as well as some handling equipment, are also commonly sprayed with a releasing agent before filling to aid release. Diesel oil is no longer used as a release agent due to environmental concerns.

=== Oil sands ===
Naturally occurring crude bitumen impregnated in sedimentary rock is the prime feed stock for petroleum production from "oil sands", currently under development in Alberta, Canada. Canada has most of the world's supply of natural bitumen, covering 140,000 square kilometres (an area larger than England), giving it the second-largest proven oil reserves in the world. The Athabasca oil sands are the largest bitumen deposit in Canada and the only one accessible to surface mining, although recent technological breakthroughs have resulted in deeper deposits becoming producible by in situ methods. Because of oil price increases after 2003, producing bitumen became highly profitable, but as a result of the decline after 2014 it became uneconomic to build new plants again. By 2014, Canadian crude bitumen production averaged about 2.3 million barrels (370,000 m^{3}) per day and was projected to rise to 4.4 million barrels (700,000 m^{3}) per day by 2020. The total amount of crude bitumen in Alberta that could be extracted is estimated to be about 310 billion barrels (50×10^{9} m^{3}), which at a rate of 4,400,000 barrels per day (700,000 m^{3}/d) would last about 200 years.

=== Alternatives and bioasphalt ===
Although uncompetitive economically, bitumen can be made from nonpetroleum-based renewable resources such as sugar, molasses and rice, corn and potato starches. Bitumen can also be made from waste material by fractional distillation of used motor oil, which is sometimes otherwise disposed of by burning or dumping into landfills. Use of motor oil may cause premature cracking in colder climates, resulting in roads that need to be repaved more frequently.

Nonpetroleum-based asphalt binders can be made light-colored. Lighter-colored roads absorb less heat from solar radiation, reducing their contribution to the urban heat island effect. Parking lots that use bitumen alternatives are called green parking lots.

=== Albanian deposits ===
Selenizza is a naturally occurring solid hydrocarbon bitumen found in native deposits in Selenice, in Albania, the only European asphalt mine still in use. The bitumen is found in the form of veins, filling cracks in a more or less horizontal direction. The bitumen content varies from 83% to 92% (soluble in carbon disulphide), with a penetration value near to zero and a softening point (ring and ball) around 120 °C. The insoluble matter, consisting mainly of silica ore, ranges from 8% to 17%.

Albanian bitumen extraction has a long history and was practiced in an organized way by the Romans. After centuries of silence, the first mentions of Albanian bitumen appeared only in 1868, when the Frenchman Coquand published the first geological description of the deposits of Albanian bitumen. In 1875, the exploitation rights were granted to the Ottoman government and in 1912, they were transferred to the Italian company Simsa. Since 1945, the mine was exploited by the Albanian government and from 2001 to date, the management passed to a French company, which organized the mining process for the manufacture of the natural bitumen on an industrial scale.

Today the mine is predominantly exploited in an open pit quarry but several of the many underground mines (deep and extending over several km) still remain viable. Selenizza is produced primarily in granular form, after melting the bitumen pieces selected in the mine.

Selenizza is mainly used as an additive in the road construction sector. It is mixed with traditional bitumen to improve both the viscoelastic properties and the resistance to ageing. It may be blended with the hot bitumen in tanks, but its granular form allows it to be fed in the mixer or in the recycling ring of normal asphalt plants. Other typical applications include the production of mastic asphalts for sidewalks, bridges, car-parks and urban roads as well as drilling fluid additives for the oil and gas industry. Selenizza is available in powder or in granular material of various particle sizes and is packaged in sacks or in thermal fusible polyethylene bags.

A life-cycle assessment study of the natural selenizza compared with petroleum bitumen has shown that the environmental impact of the selenizza is about half the impact of the road asphalt produced in oil refineries in terms of carbon dioxide emission.

== Recycling ==
Bitumen is a commonly recycled material in the construction industry. The two most common recycled materials that contain bitumen are reclaimed asphalt pavement (RAP) and reclaimed asphalt shingles (RAS). RAP is recycled at a greater rate than any other material in the United States, and typically contains approximately 5–6% bitumen binder. Asphalt shingles typically contain 20–40% bitumen binder.

Bitumen naturally becomes stiffer over time due to oxidation, evaporation, exudation, and physical hardening. For this reason, recycled asphalt is typically combined with virgin asphalt, softening agents, and/or rejuvenating additives to restore its physical and chemical properties.

== Economics ==
Although bitumen typically makes up only 4 to 5 percent (by weight) of the pavement mixture, as the pavement's binder, it is also the most expensive part of the cost of the road-paving material.

During bitumen's early use in modern paving, oil refiners gave it away. However, bitumen is a highly traded commodity today. Its prices increased substantially in the early 21st Century. A U.S. government report states:

In 2002, asphalt sold for approximately $160 per ton. By the end of 2006, the cost had doubled to approximately $320 per ton, and then it almost doubled again in 2012 to approximately $610 per ton.

The report indicates that an "average" 1-mile (1.6-kilometer)-long, four-lane highway would include "300 tons of asphalt," which, "in 2002 would have cost around $48,000. By 2006 this would have increased to $96,000 and by 2012 to $183,000... an increase of about $135,000 for every mile of highway in just 10 years."

The Middle East is a significant exporter of bitumen, particularly to India and China. According to the Argus Bitumen Report (2024/07/12), India is the largest importer, driven by extensive infrastructure projects. The report projects a CAGR of 4.5% for India's bitumen imports over the next five years, while China's imports are expected to grow at a CAGR of 3.8%. The current export price to India is approximately $350 per metric ton, and for China, it is around $360 per metric ton. The Middle East's strategic advantage in crude oil production underpins its capacity to meet these demands.

== Health and safety ==
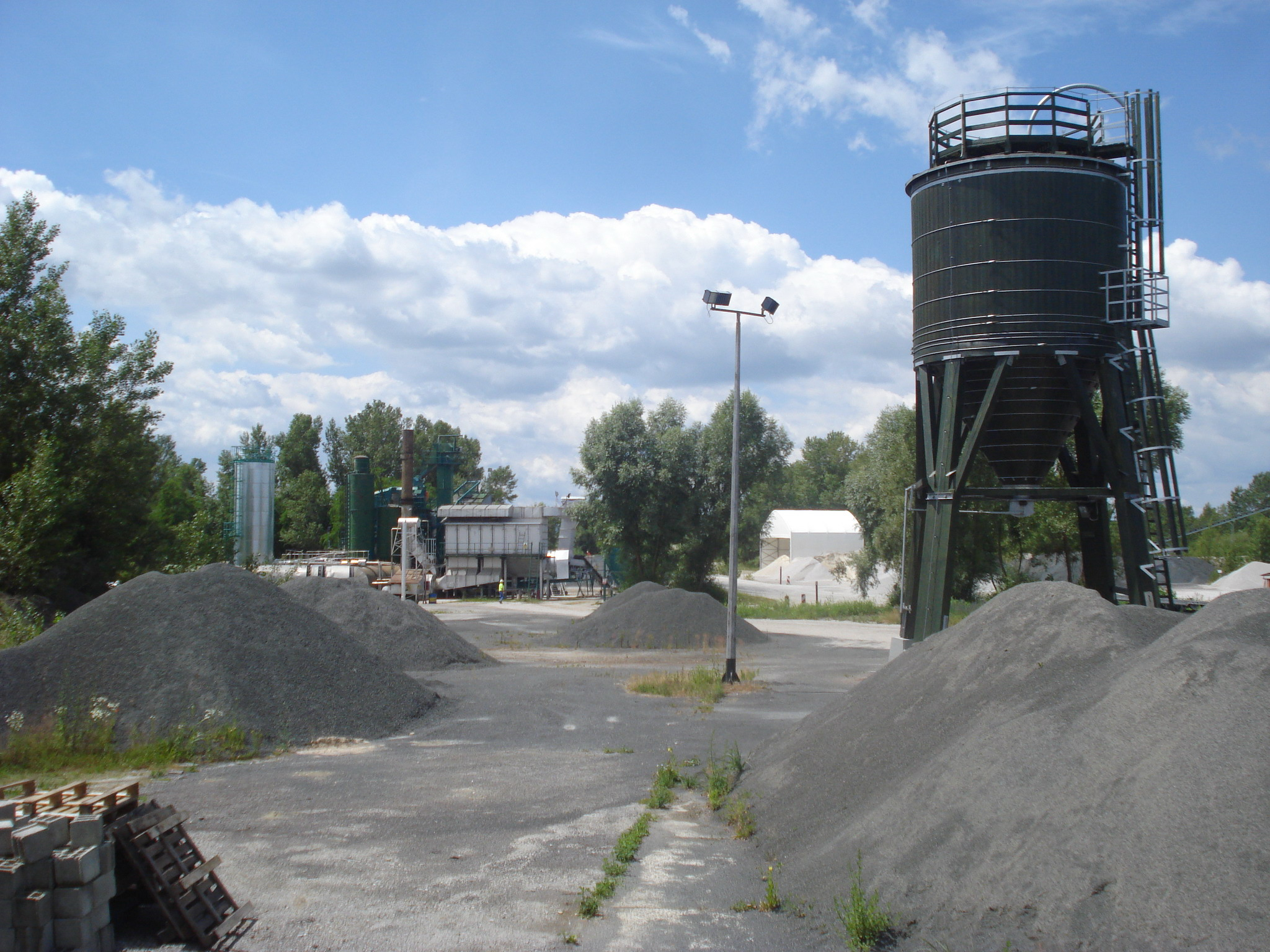
An asphalt mixing plant for hot aggregate

People can be exposed to bitumen in the workplace by breathing in fumes or skin absorption. The National Institute for Occupational Safety and Health (NIOSH) has set a recommended exposure limit of 5 mg/m^{3} over a 15-minute period.

Bitumen is a largely inert material that must be heated or diluted to a point where it becomes workable for the production of materials for paving, roofing, and other applications. In examining the potential health hazards associated with bitumen, the International Agency for Research on Cancer (IARC) determined that it is the application parameters, predominantly temperature, that affect occupational exposure and the potential bioavailable carcinogenic hazard/risk of the bitumen emissions. In particular, temperatures greater than 199 °C (390 °F), were shown to produce a greater exposure risk than when bitumen was heated to lower temperatures, such as those typically used in asphalt pavement mix production and placement. IARC has classified paving asphalt fumes as a Class 2B possible carcinogen, indicating inadequate evidence of carcinogenicity in humans.

In 2020, scientists reported that bitumen currently is a significant and largely overlooked source of air pollution in urban areas, especially during hot and sunny periods.

A bitumen-like substance found in the Himalayas and known as shilajit is sometimes used as an Ayurveda medicine, but is not in fact a tar, resin or bitumen.

== See also ==
- Asphalt plant
- Asphaltene
- Bioasphalt
- Bitumen-based fuel
- Bituminous coal
- Bituminous rocks
- Blacktop
- Cariphalte
- Duxit
- Macadam
- Oil sands
- Pitch drop experiment
- Pitch (resin)
- Railbit
- Road surface
- Tar
- Tarmac
- Sealcoat
- Stamped asphalt
