= Oil recycling =

Oil recycling may refer to:

- Automotive oil recycling
- Vegetable oil recycling
