= Duxite =

Duxite is a mostly black-brown fossil resin from Miocenes lignite layers in the northern Bohemia. The resin is first mentioned in 1874 by Christian Dölter. It is named after the small Czech town of Duchcov (German: Dux) in northern Bohemia, where it was found in the lignite mining Emeran. Not far from Duchcov, duxite has been found since the 1980s in a lignite workhouse at Bílina. In the lower section of the mined here lignite occur grade category tree residues with duxite. Mostly it involves Taxodium.

== Properties ==
Cornelio Doelter reported the following composition for the samples which were extracted in 1874 (air-dry basis): 78.25% carbon, 8.14% hydrogen, 13.19% oxygen and 0.42% sulfur. The specific gravity was determined 1.133. The sample was in alcohol sparingly soluble in benzene. Doelter noted a certain similarity of the analyzed sample resin to Walchowit, gave the resin but because of the opposite Walchowit significantly higher oxygen content and because of some differing physical properties has its own name. He classified duxite in the category of Retinite fossil resins. Already in the middle of the 20th century, duxite was known as the "Resinous bitumen". Modern methods of investigation, such as the infrared spectroscopy shows that duxite is not a pure resin, but a mixture of saturated hydrocarbons and plant resins and waxes.
