= Percy Dudgeon Quensel =

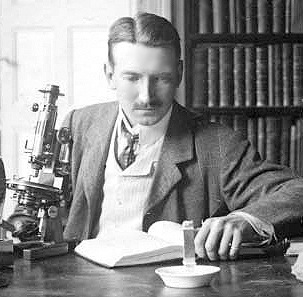

Percy Dudgeon Quensel (8 September 1881 – 3 March 1966) was a Swedish geologist and was a professor of mineralogy and petrography at Stockholm University. Quensel Glacier in South Georgia is named after him as is the mineral Quenselite.

== Life and work ==
Quensel was born in Marstrand, the son of theology professor Oscar Quensel. His mother was born in Sweden but of Scottish parents and so he spoke English at home. He had an interest in natural history at a young age and studied at Uppsala University where he was influenced by Arvid Högbom and received a degree in geology. He worked under Carl Doelter in Graz in 1905-6 and then with Harry Rosenbusch and Viktor Mordechai Goldschmidt at Heidelberg. While in Graz, he attended the geological congress in Rome and was able to witness the eruption of Vesuvius, approach and collect some geological samples. He was invited to the so-called Swedish Magellanic Expedition to South America by Carl Skottsberg and spent two years from 1907 examining the rocks in South Georgia and the Juan Fernández Islands. In 1910 he attended the geology congress at Stockholm and came to interact with many geologists. He wrote his doctoral thesis, Geologisch-petrographische Studien in der patagonischen Cordillera based on this study on the tertiary igneous rocks of the Andes and received his doctorate in 1911 from Uppsala. In 1914 he became a professor of mineralogy and petrography at Stockholm University. He worked on surveys of the Västerbotten mountains with Helge Backlund from 1918 to 1928 for the Swedish Geological Survey. The result was a map at a 1:200,000 scale. He travelled widely and continued to interact with geologists from around the world. During World War I he made a trip to the Urals to collect minerals. Quensel took a special interest in the pegmatites. He also collected other natural history specimens during his travels and a species of plant from South America Senecio quenselii and a fossil Aphrodina quenseli are named after him. He was made member of the Swedish Academy of Sciences in 1939.

Quensel married Annie Weiss (1886-1933) in 1911 and they had two daughters, Margit and Ella. Margit later became a noted psychoanalyst. Quensel is buried in a family grave in the Örgryte old cemetery in Gothenburg.
