= Adam Quesnell =

American stand-up comedian

- Pronunciation: quen-NELL
- Born: Adam Ross Quesnell; 1981 or 1982 (age 43–44); Thief River Falls, Minnesota
- Education: Minnesota State University Moorhead
- Occupation: Stand-up comedian
- Years active: 2009-present

Adam Quesnell is an American stand-up comedian and screenwriter from Fargo, North Dakota now living in Los Angeles.

Quesnell has released two comedy albums on Stand Up! Records, 2014's Can We Afford This Much Despair? and 2018's Despair 2: Social Justice Warlord, as well as the 2018 single Egghead.

== Early life ==
Quesnell was born in Thief River Falls, Minnesota, where he graduated from Lincoln High School. His father, Curt Quesnell, was a broadcaster on Thief River Falls radio stations KKAQ-AM and KKDQ-FM, where he hosted the longtime show North Country Outdoors Radio, and a fishing guide on Lake of the Woods.

He earned an MFA in scriptwriting in 2007 from Minnesota State University Moorhead.

== Career ==
=== Stand-up comedy ===
Chicago Now called Quesnell's comedy "soul-lifting" in spite of his often dark subject matter. The Minnesota Daily described it as "dark but digestible", noting that his humor often deals with social anxiety. Fargo Monthly called him "goofy and dark." The Fargo newspaper High Plains Reader called his comedy "razor sharp, perfectly timed, both nuanced and broad".

Quesnell began performing stand-up in Fargo, North Dakota in 2009. As his career progressed, Quesnell moved from Fargo to the larger city of Minneapolis and eventually to Los Angeles, where he now lives and works as a screenwriter.

His first performance was as the opening act for Todd Barry. He has also performed with Maria Bamford and Kyle Kinane. Quesnell quickly became an organizer as well, producing shows and promoting open mics in the Fargo-Moorhead area. The High Plains Reader newspaper credited him with "planting the seed for the burgeoning comedy scene in Fargo." He was named Fargo's No. 2 comedian in a 2015 poll by the High Plains Reader.

He has performed at the 10,000 Laughs Comedy Festival, SF Sketchfest, San Francisco Comedy Festival, Akumal Comedy Festival, New Orleans' Hell Yes Fest, and the Chicago Comedy Exposition.

=== Screenwriting ===
His one-hour science fiction pilot The Insomniacs was produced as an audio drama in 2020 for Alison Mauldin's screenwriting podcast The Scriptcast.

In 2006, his short play Parachutes won the Midwest regional award at the Kennedy Center American College Theater Festival; another play, Labyrinth, was also nominated.

=== Albums ===
Quesnell has released two comedy albums on Stand Up! Records, 2014's Can We Afford This Much Despair? and 2018's Despair 2: Social Justice Warlord, as well as the 2018 single Egghead. Quesnell's debut was recorded at Minneapolis' CONvergence sci-fi convention in 2013. It reached No. 13 on the iTunes comedy chart. Followup album Despair 2 was recorded at the Red Raven cafe in Fargo.

An avid toy collector, Quesnell and Stand Up! producer Dan Schlissel made a collectible figure of the "Despair" monster on the cover of his first album, which Quesnell called "a sad devil version of myself".

Richard Lanoie of The Serious Comedy Site called Can We Afford This Much Despair? "particularly smart" and said "I look forward to more of" Quesnell. Writing about Despair 2, Lanoie praised Quesnell's ability to segue between "a smartly veiled comment on racism in the U.S." and a "silly bit on the difference between a baby ghost and a ghost baby." Although he felt Quesnell's Donald Trump commentary was "banal," he further praised Quesnell's ability to disguise the sharpness of his satire inside "seeming superficiality." Catherine Gill of website The Dirty Vegan called Quesnell's comedy "relatable and socially aware" and found his penchant for self-deprecation "hilarious and refreshing." Joe Christianson of the comedy podcast Joke Quest 200 called his albums "magnificent." Johnny Taylor of comedy website Now Hear This called Social Justice Warlord one of his favorite comedy albums of 2018 and said, "Quesnell delivers a smart, edgy, and current hour of stand-up comedy that will appeal to a larger portion of people than his reputation as a 'nerd' comic suggests."

== Personal life ==
"Quesnell", a surname of French origin, is pronounced with a silent S.

== Discography ==
Despair II: Social Justice Warlord
Review scores
| Source | Rating |
|---|---|
| Now Hear This | 4.5/5 stars |

- Adam Quesnell, Can We Afford This Much Despair? (Stand Up! Records, 2014)
- Adam Quesnell, Despair 2: Social Justice Warlord (Stand Up! Records, 2018)
- Adam Quesnell, Egghead (Stand Up! Records, 2018)

== Podcast appearances ==
- Magnotronic, Episode 401: Adam Quesnell (Sept. 1, 2015)
- Big Money Movie Ideas, Episode 9: Skinprint (August 28, 2018)
- Bleak In Review, Episode 203: Vice President Angry-Boner (Sept. 27, 2019)
- The Goods from the Woods, Episode 268: Toy Collecting with Adam Quesnell (Oct. 16, 2019)
- Joke Quest 200, "Adam Quesnell" (Sept. 28, 2020)
- The Scriptcast, "Episode 2: The Insomniacs" (October 29, 2020)
- The Scriptcast, "Scriptcast Conversations - The Insomniacs" (November 18, 2020)
- Joke Quest 200, "Adam Quesnell and Dan Bublitz" (April 27, 2021)
- The Goods from the Woods, Patreon Episode 5: Super Mario Bros. with Adam Quesnell (August 4, 2021)
