= Cariphalte =

Brand of bitumen sealant

Cariphalte is a brand of hot-pour rubberised bitumen sealant (bitumen technology) manufactured by Shell Bitumen, used for race track and expansion joints. It was released for commercial use in 1986 and has been used on Cleveland and Kent concrete roadways including Dartford Crossing, the A4, the A10, the M2, and the M20.

There are two brands of Cariphalte:

- Cariphalte DM is a "styrene block co-polymer, styrene-butadiene-styrene (SBS)".
- Cariphalte DA is "used for friction course mixtures".
