= Maltenes =

Maltenes are the n-alkane (pentane or heptane)-soluble molecular components of asphalt, which is the residue remaining after petroleum refiners remove other useful derivatives such as gasoline and kerosene from crude oil. Asphaltene compounds are the other primary component of asphalt.

== Composition ==
As viscous liquids, maltenes consist of heavy, dark-colored asphaltic resins, first acidaffins, second acidaffins, and saturates, combined with lighter colored oils. The resins provide the adhesive qualities in asphalts; the oils are the carrier medium for both the maltene resins and the asphaltene compounds. Maltenes are characterized by their lower molecular weight and their solubility, in comparison with asphaltenes. Using adsorption chromatography in the presence of an acid reagent, maltenes can be separated into four fractions:

- The polar compounds are highly reactive petroleum resins that act as a colloidal dispersion stabilizer for the asphaltene substrate.
- First acidaffins are aromatic hydrocarbons, with or without oxygen, nitrogen and sulfur. They provide a chemically compatible dispersing agent for peptized asphaltene.
- Second acidaffins are straight chain or cyclic unsaturated petro-hydrocarbons (aka olefins). They are somewhat oily and somewhat resinous.
- Saturates (aka paraffins) are either straight or branch chain saturated hydrocarbons. They are the true oil component of asphalt binder, and function as the gelling agent for the asphalt compounds.

== Analysis ==
It had long been suspected that asphalt pavement deterioration resulted from chemical reactions of specific asphalt components. In 1959, Fritz Rostler observed: “It is generally recognized that failures of asphalt pavements caused by embrittlement and other changes in physical properties during the aging process are due to chemical reactions of all or some of the asphalt components.”

It was Rostler who undertook the necessary research to identify the asphalt components and chemical processes contributing to the aging process. His methodology was to separate the asphalt components by first using sulfuric acid to separate the soluble components, then using an n-pentane solvent to separate the insoluble components.

Rostler’s work in the rubber industry led to the development of ASTM Test D-2006-70, which accurately identifies the relationships between the light fraction maltenes, acidaffins and saturates. Although this test has not been updated since 1970, it remains an accurate standard for defining the desirable maltene content distribution in asphalt pavement.

Rostler Analysis aka ASTM Test D-2006-70

Where PC represents Polar Compounds, A1 represents First Acidaffins, A2 represents Second Acidaffins, and S represents Saturated Hydrocarbons:

Min. Max. Maltene Distribution Ratio D-2006-70 0.3 0.6 (PC + A1) / (S + A2)

Rostler determined that the loss of the low-molecular-weight maltene components in asphalt is largely responsible for the cracking and hardening seen in aging pavement. This discovery led to the development of commercial rejuvenators that combine maltene fractions of asphalt with a carrier capable of penetrating asphalt pavements, in order to restore the proper balance of asphalt components.

== Geochemistry ==
The geochemical composition of maltenes varies according to the crude oil source, with any given maltene fraction representing a wide variety of base elements of different concentrations, which may include, for example, cobalt, chromium, copper, iron, molybdenum, manganese, nickel, strontium, vanadium, or zinc.
