= Swedish Magellanic Expedition =

Research expedition to Patagonia 1907-1909

- Country: Chile, Argentina
- Leader: Carl Skottsberg
- Start: Sweden; 1907
- End: Sweden; 1909
- Goal: Botanical, geographical and geological research in Patagonia and Tierra del Fuego

The Swedish Magellanic expedition, 1907–09 was a scientific expedition undertaken by Carl Johan Fredrik Skottsberg, Percy Dudgeon Quensel and Thore Gustaf Halle to study the geography, geology and flora of Patagonia. Other areas studied include Tierra del Fuego, Falkland Islands, Juan Fernández Islands, Chiloé Archipelago and Central Chile. Another of the expeditions goals were to study the Alakaluf Indians that lived in the channels of western Patagonia.

Carl Skottsberg (1880–1963) was a botanist who was appointed professor and director of the Göteborg Botanical Garden in 1919. Percy Quensel (1881–1966) was a geologist who was appointed professor of mineralogy and petrography at Stockholm University in 1914. Thore Gustaf Halle (1884–1964) was a botanist and geologist who became professor and curator at the Swedish Museum of Natural History in 1915.

== See also ==
- Swedish Antarctic Expedition

== Other Sources ==
- Swedish Magellanic Expedition: Preliminary report JSTOR 1777521
- Carl Johan Fredrik Skottsberg (Dictionary of Falklands Biography)
- Thore Gustaf Halle (Dictionary of Falklands Biography)

== Related reading ==
- Thore Gustaf Halle (1911) On the geological structure and history of the Falkland Islands (Uppsala University)
- Percy D. Quensel (1911) Geologisch-petrographische Studien in der patagonischen Cordillera (Uppsala University)
- Carl Skottsberg (1919) The Wilds of Patagonia (London: Edward Arnold)
