= Quesnel =

Quesnel or Quesnell means "little oak" in the Picard dialect of French. It is used as a proper name and may refer to:

== Places ==
- Le Quesnel, a commune the Somme department in France
- Quesnel, British Columbia, a city in British Columbia, Canada
- Quesnel Forks, British Columbia, a ghost town in British Columbia, Canada
- Quesnell Heights, Edmonton, a neighbourhood in Edmonton, Alberta, Canada

== Geographical features ==
- Quesnel Lake
- Quesnel River
- Quesnel Highland

== People ==
- Adam Quesnell (born 1981/1982), American stand-up comedian
- Chantal Quesnel (born 1971), Canadian actress
- Désiré Quesnel (1843–1915), French wood-engraver
- François Quesnel (1543–1619), 16th-century French artist
- François Jean Baptiste Quesnel (1768–1819), French general under Napoleon
- Frédéric-Auguste Quesnel (1785–1866) Canadian lawyer and politician
- Joseph Quesnel (1746–1809), Canadian operatic composer/playwright
- Jules-Maurice Quesnel (1786–1842), Canadian fur-trader and politician
- Pasquier Quesnel (1634–1719), French Jansenist theologian
- Peter Quesnel (or Quesuel) (d. 1299?), Franciscan
- Pierre Quesnel (1502–1580), 16th-century French artist, worked in Scotland
- Pooky Quesnel (born 1966), English actress
- Yannick Quesnel (born 1973), French retired footballer

== Other ==
- Quesnel (sternwheeler)
- Quesnell Bridge, in Edmonton AB, Canada, over North Saskatchewan River

== See also ==
- Quensel, a superficially similar surname, but of Swedish extraction
