= Railbit =

Railbit is a common blend of bitumen and diluent used for rail transport. Railbit which contains approximately 17% diluents or less. (Note: Citing Kinder Morgan Cochin LLC.) compared to 30% in dilbit. Dilbit can be transported through pipelines but railbit cannot. To prevent solidifying in lower temperatures, both raw bitumen and railbit require insulated rail cars with steam-heated coils. Because it has a smaller percentage of diluents, railbit crude requires special capacity rail unload terminals capable of loading railbit and of handling larger unit trains. By the fall 2013 approximately 25% had that capacity. The U.S. State Department in their 2014 Final Supplemental Environmental Impact Statement (SEIS) regarding the proposed extension to the Keystone Pipeline, acknowledged that,

[R]aw bitumen by rail could provide better netbacks than dilbit by pipeline (Fielden 2013; Genscape 2013). Dedicated rail cars, DRUs, and/or rail terminal equipment are needed to effectively transport rawbit, which explains why most producers opt for pipelines given current infrastructure. There are increasing reports of producers doing increased testing of the potential to ship rawbit (MEG Energy third quarter earnings call; Cenovus third quarter earnings call).

— SEIS 2014

== Crude oil by rail ==
Although dilbit has been transported by rail since at least 1998, however, the trend in Canada to transport crude oil by rail was slower than in the United States. According to Statistics Canada there were 60 percent more rail cars transporting crude oil in Canada from February 2012 to February 2013. The destination of approximately 48 percent of the crude oil was exported to the Gulf Coast of the United States; 43 percent went to PADD I and the rest to PADD II and PADD V.

== Railbit tank cars ==
These tank cars hold less volume (~550 Bbl) than "regular" tank cars (~650 Bbl) but can move bitumen with a reduced diluent content (17 percent – railbit) or no diluent at all (raw bitumen). A number of rail offloading terminals on the Gulf Coast are being built out to handle raw bitumen so as to improve the economics of crude-by-rail shipments to the US Gulf versus pipeline alternatives. We will get into the economics later in this series but today we start with a review of the largest offloading terminal operation being built so far in Mobile, Alabama.

— Fielden (RBN) 16 September 2013

[O]ne can consider a reasonable range of estimates of the transport penalty, relative to committed pipeline tariffs, associated with transporting oil sands crude by rail from Alberta to the Gulf Coast as follows: rawbit less than $3.00 per barrel (perhaps even more economic than dilbit by pipeline); railbit $5 to $7 per barrel; and dilbit $7 to $9 per barrel. The transport penalty would be lower if rail costs were compared to uncommitted pipeline tariffs, or if diluent were backhauled.

— SEIS 2014

Sandy Fielden explained the economics behind railbit, dilbit and raw bitumen.

and as long as diluent prices in Canada are more expensive than dilbit on the Gulf Coast. If these price dynamics continue, then moving bitumen by rail can compete with pipelines – so long as the product moved is railbit or raw bitumen – with the latter having a clear advantage. Unit trains also improve the netbacks considerably over the manifest option. Even moving railbit by manifest rail gives a more than $3/Bbl higher netback than dilbit by pipeline. At the moment, however, our survey of load and discharge terminals in Canada and on the Gulf Coast suggests that the infrastructure is not in place yet to take advantage of this opportunity. Where there are unit train facilities built or under construction, they are primarily shipping dilbit, which produces $6/Bbl less netback than pipelines. The railbit facilities are manifest terminals that have a more slender advantage over pipelines. In other words – for rail to trump pipelines from Canada to the US Gulf, shippers must develop unit rail facilities that can handle railbit or better yet can remove all the diluent to ship raw bitumen.[1] We estimated the railbit price as midway between the raw bitumen price and the dilbit price. In a more rigorous analysis we would use typical refinery yields for raw bitumen, dilbit, and railbit to determine a more accurate value of these different blends on the Gulf Coast.

— Fielden (RBN) 16 September 2013

== Western Canadian crude oil supply ==
In their June 2013 report, the Canadian Association of Petroleum Producers (CAPP) categorized "the various crude oil types that comprise western Canadian crude oil supply:

Various crude oil types

- Conventional Light
- Conventional Heavy
- Upgraded Light
- Oil Sands Heavy, for example, (Western Canadian Select)

Oil Sands Heavy

"Oil Sands Heavy includes some volumes of upgraded heavy sour crude oil and bitumen blended with diluent or upgraded crude oil."

- upgraded heavy sour crude oil
- bitumen diluted with upgraded light crude oil (also known as "SynBit") synthetic crude oil (SCO)
- bitumen diluted with condensate (also known as "DilBit"). "Blending for DilBit differs by project but requires approximately a 70:30 bitumen to condensate ratio while the blending ratio for SynBit is approximately 50:50."
- Railbit "Bitumen volumes transported by rail are currently relatively minor; however, these volumes would require less diluent for blending versus moving by pipeline or may even be transported as raw bitumen."

Condensate is a "mixture of mainly pentanes and heavier hydrocarbons. It may be gaseous in its reservoir state but is liquid at the conditions under which its volumes is measured or estimated."

This was sent to Copyright examinations on December 19, 2016: Devon Canada Corporation, Devon's Canadian operations, which was established on January 1, 1982, are conducted by Devon Energy's wholly owned subsidiary which is headquartered in downtown Calgary, Alberta.
