= Quensel Glacier =

Glacier in Antarctica

- Location within South Georgia Island
- Location: South Georgia
- Coordinates: 54°46′S 35°50′W
- Thickness: unknown
- Terminus: Cooper Bay
- Status: unknown

Quensel Glacier (54°46′S 35°50′W) is a small glacier flowing southeast into Cooper Bay at the east tip of South Georgia. It was named by the United Kingdom Antarctic Place-Names Committee (UK-APC) after Percy D. Quensel, Swedish geologist of Uppsala University, who visited South Georgia with Carl Skottsberg in 1909.

== See also ==
- List of glaciers in the Antarctic
- Glaciology
