= Green parking lot =

Parking facility designed to be environmentally more sustainable

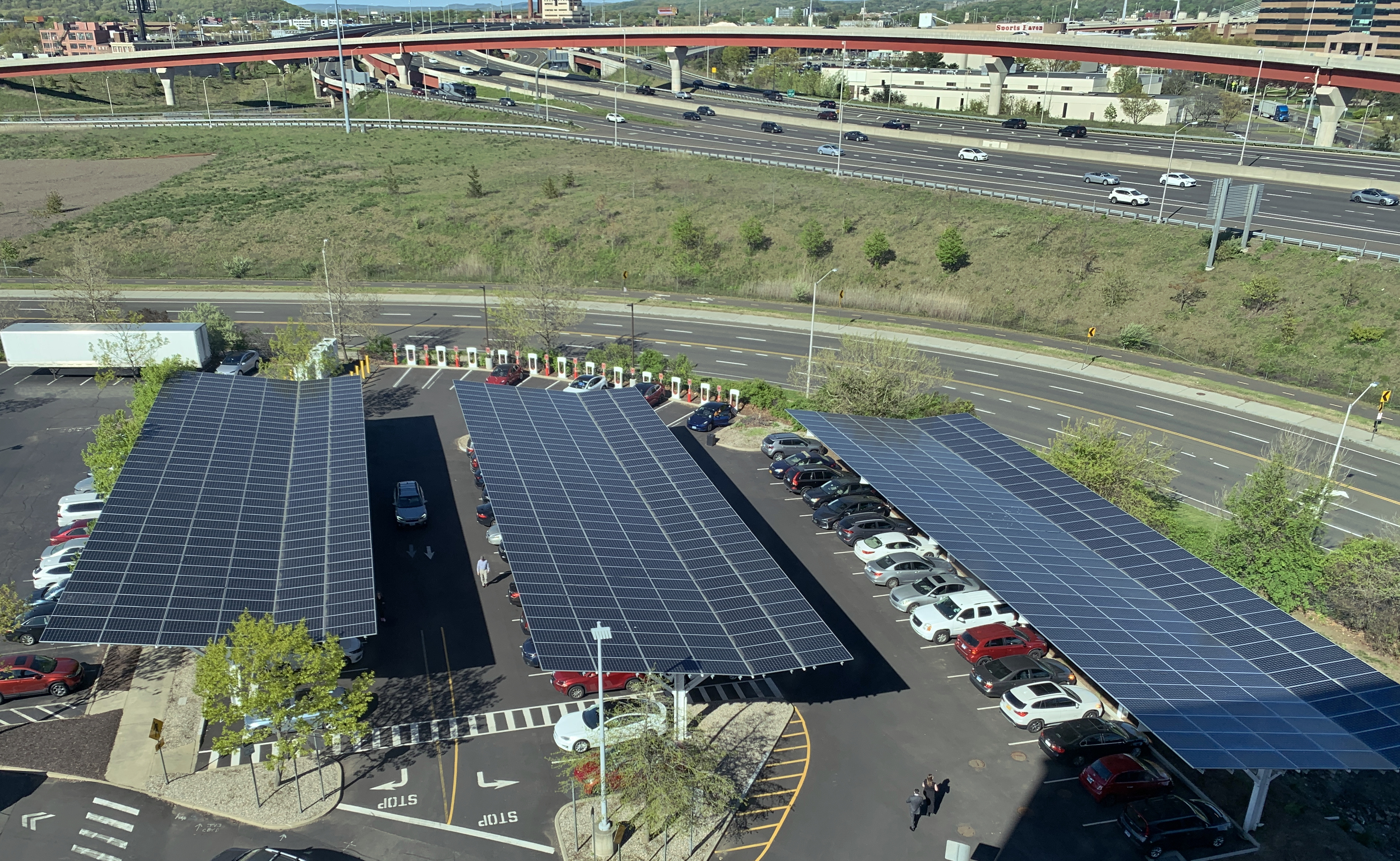
Solar canopy parking lot in New Haven at Hotel Marcel. There are EV level 2 chargers underneath the canopy and a 12-stall Tesla Supercharger behind.

Green parking lots are a form of parking lot designed to be environmentally more sustainable. Many agencies and organizations have released different standards as to what will be considered a green parking lot. As an example, in the Toronto guidelines the purpose of a green parking lot is to use all the leftover spaces in parking lots in more environmentally friendly manners, and also to make changes to parking lots without interfering with their ability to serve as a parking lot; the US Environmental Protection Agency has released guidelines referring to a green parking lot as any lot which contains environmentally preferable features.

== Minimized impervious surfaces ==
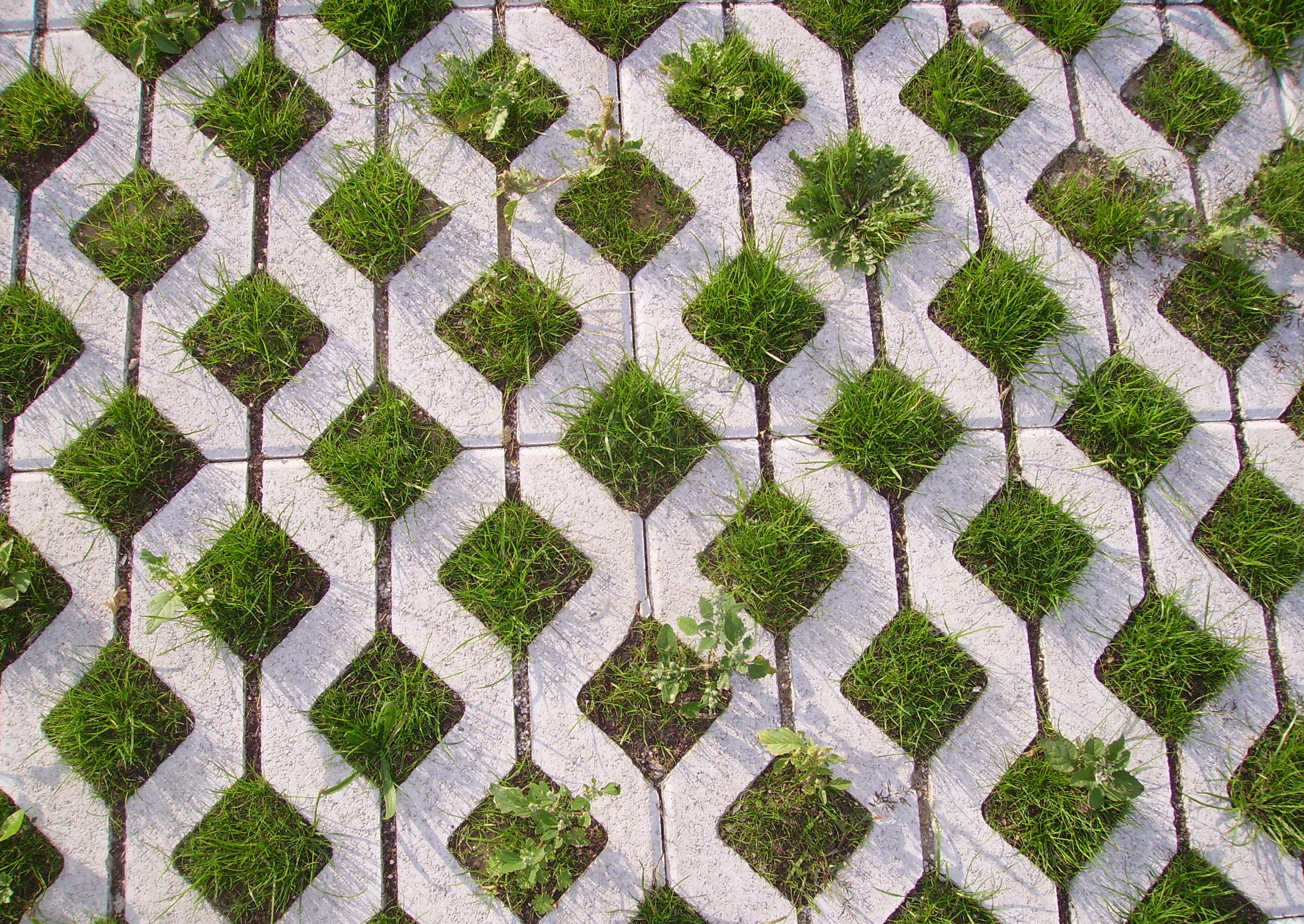
Example of turf grid

The largest feature of the parking lot is its paved area, hence, by changing this surface to be more permeable to water the parking lot will drain better. Some surface options are open joint pavers, porous asphalt, pervious concrete, or a turf grid. Drainage may be an important part of a green parking lot because runoff is often a serious concern. In addition to using a more porous surface, a more porous subsurface may be used to maximize drainage through the parking lot surface. Drains and low-lying areas for water retention can also be components of a green parking lot.

== Bicycles ==
Another component of green parking lots, according to Toronto's guide, is locations for bicycle storage. As bicycles are more environmentally friendly than cars it is important for a green parking lot to contain a bicycle rack.

== Lighting ==
Minimizing energy consumption is another possible envonmental feature. Green parking lots often use scaled lighting; shorter light poles and less intense lighting where pedestrians or bicycles will be, and higher intensity lighting in areas where cars are, to minimize over-lighting of areas that don't need to be lit. Green parking lots may also power the lighting using solar or wind among other renewable forms of energy.

== Solar canopy ==
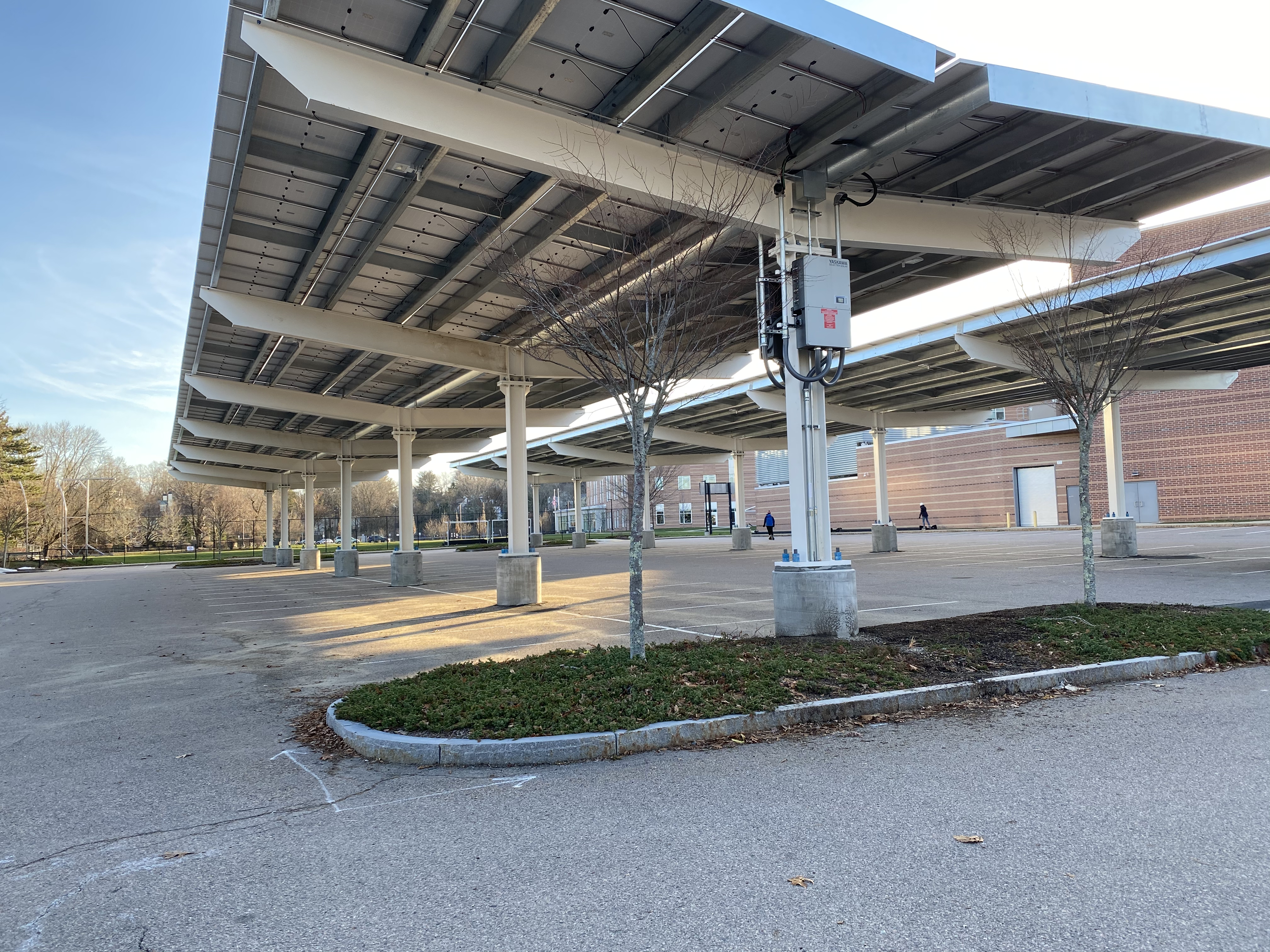
Solar canopies over a high school parking lot

A solar canopy or carport is a structure that elevates an array of photovoltaic panels above ground level so that the area under the panels can be used for other purposes. Many solar canopies are built over parking lots, where in addition to generating renewable power, they also protect the cars from sun, rain and snow. When the lot is not needed for parking, the covered area can be used for other purposes.

== Vegetation ==
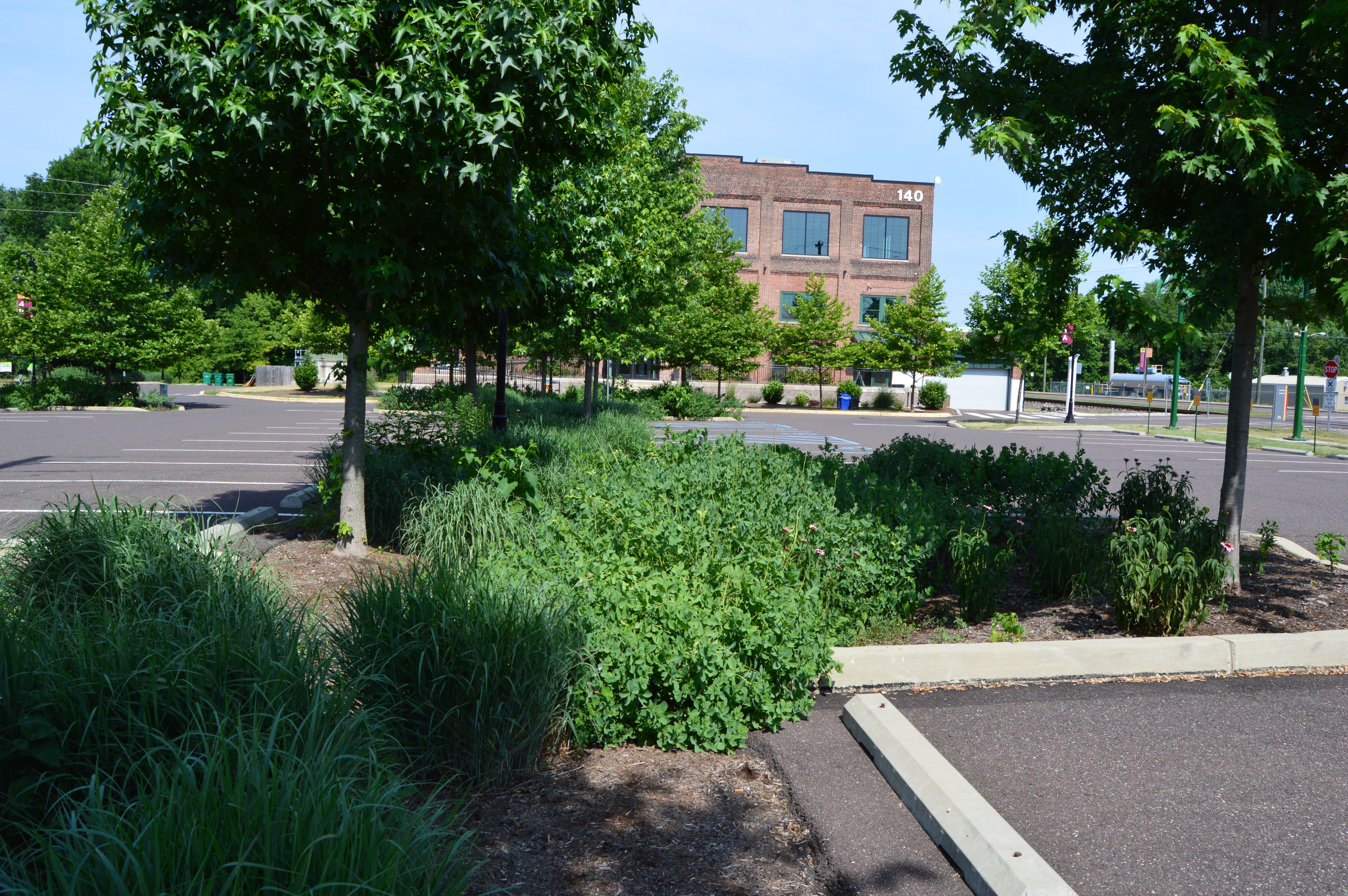
Green parking lot with bioswale

Vegetation used surrounding and within green parking lots varies with location. For this reason grasses like Kentucky Blue Grass should not be used in many areas as this grass requires large amounts of water. Trees are also good vegetation as they provide shade and generally have lower water requirements.
