= High Plains Reader =

Alternative newspaper in Fargo, North Dakota

- Type: Alternative weekly
- Format: Tabloid
- Owner(s): Raul Gomez, John Strand
- Publisher: Raul Gomez
- Editor: Sabrina Hornung
- Founded: 1994
- Headquarters: 124 N. 8th St. Fargo, ND 58102
- Circulation: 20,000-30,000
- Website: hpr1.com

The High Plains Reader is an alternative newspaper serving the Fargo metropolitan area, with an estimated readership of 20,000 to 30,000 weekly between print and online readers. The tabloid was founded in 1994 by Ian Swanson, Peter Ryan, and Len Schmid in Grand Forks, North Dakota and is currently owned by Raul Gomez and John Strand who purchased the paper in late December 1996. After a flood and fire destroyed their Grand Forks office, the Reader moved its office to Fargo. Distribution ended in the Grand Forks area in 2009.

== Features ==
The paper features reviews of bands, movies, and theater in Fargo-Moorhead, plus a calendar of weekly events. Its editorials generally take a more leftist tack than those of The Forum of Fargo-Moorhead.

Recurring portions of the High Plains Reader include the weekly editorial, written by Editor Sabrina Hornung, photojournalist and news editor C.S. Christopher Hagen, or Co-owner John Strand; the cover story; features; opinion; wellness; a theater column; movie reviews by Greg Carlson; a Best Bets section, generally giving brief synopses of upcoming events, focusing mostly on local musicians; and a calendar section, a detailed list of daily events for the upcoming week.
