= Margit Norell =

Swedish psychoanalyst (1914–2005)

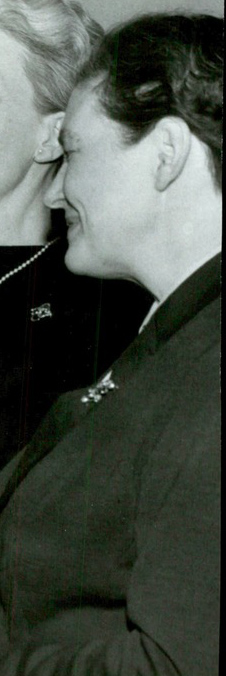
Margit Norell in 1958

Margit Sonja Annie Norell (née Quensel; 23 February 1914 – 28 January 2005) was a Swedish psychoanalyst.

== Biography ==
Margit Norell was born in and grew up in Uppsala and Stockholm, as the daughter of geology professor Percy Quensel and zoologist and journalist Annie Weiss. She was the granddaughter of theology professor Oscar Quensel. She graduated Bachelor and trained as a psychoanalyst. She resigned from the Swedish Psychoanalytical Association in the 1960s, and in 1968 established the Swedish Association for Holistic Psychotherapy and Psychoanalysis.

Norell felt that deep-seated, repressed memories could be brought forward in therapy, and advocated a psychoanalytic treatment for developing them. This approach was popular in the US during the 1980s and formed the basis for expert testimony in several criminal cases in Sweden in the 1990s. This pseudoscientific approach led to the largest miscarriage of justice case in Swedish history, the Thomas Quick case.

Norell was a supervisor and therapist for psychologists and therapists who treated and studied Thomas Quick in the Forensic Psychiatric Clinic in Säter. One of these, the psychologist Sven Å. Christianson was an expert witness in the murder trial of Quick. Norell was also the mentor of feminist therapist Hanna Olsson who, on Norell's advice, wrote the book Catrine och rättvisan (Catrine and Justice) which detailed the acclaimed Catrine da Costa murder case. They also collaborated in a 1977 prostitution investigation. Dan Josefsson wrote that a "cult"-like group led by Norell manipulated the police and talked Sture Bergwall into false confessions.

Margit Norell married Curt Norell in 1939, and the couple had three children. She died at the age of 90 in Stockholm.

== See also ==
- Repressed memory
