= Annie Quensel =

Austrian-Swedish zoologist and writer

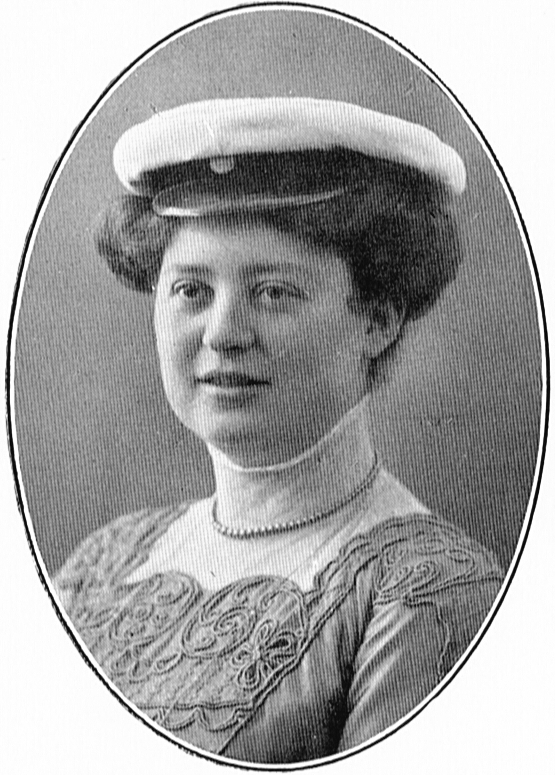

Annie Theresia Quensel née Weiss (24 October 1886 – 22 May 1933) was an Austrian and Swedish zoologist and writer. She was a specialist on the taxonomy of flatworms, particularly the Turbellaria and Rhabdocoela. She wrote on zoological topics, and also articles on everyday life from her travels around the world, particularly after marrying the geologist Percy Dudgeon Quensel.

== Life and work ==
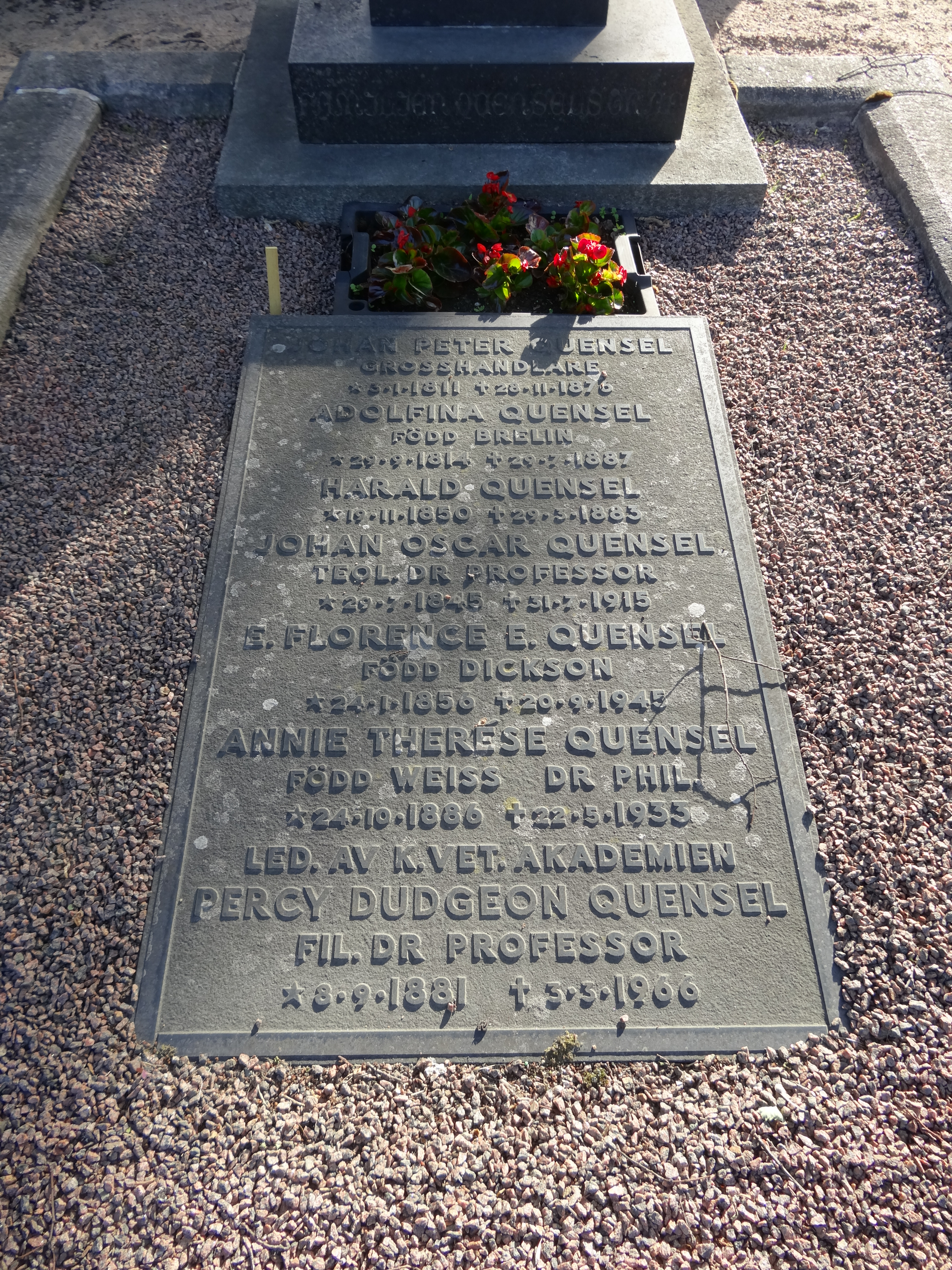
Grave marker at Örgryte cemetery

Annie was born in Graz, Austria, the daughter of law professor Dr Siegmund Weiss (1846-1922) and Therese née Stukart. She studied natural sciences at the University of Graz and received a doctorate in 1910. She studied the platyhelminthes collected by the Hamburg expedition to southwest Australia in 1905 and described the species Plagiostomum hartmeyeri, Mesostoma canum, and Mesostoma michaelseni among others in 1909.

She taught at the zoological station in Trieste from 1907 and at the infectious diseases hospital in Berlin from 1910. She served as a secretary to the International Zoological Congress in Graz in 1910. In 1911 she married Swedish geologist Percy Dudgeon Quensel.

Along with her husband, she travelled extensively and began to write about the places she visited. She wrote nearly 250 travel articles in weekly magazines based on visits to England, France, Germany, Spain, Italy, Turkey, India, Java, Thailand, Cambodia and other places. Her popularity led to her association with several organizations. She worked for the Swedish-Austrian aid committee from 1919, and was on the board of Save the Children from 1919 to 1923. The Swedish company Läkerol made use of her testimony that their lozenges helped her during travels in difficult climates.

While on a visit to the United States in 1913, where her husband attended a geological congress, the press covered articles on their membership in the "Continental Anti-kissing league" and gave talks against kissing. She wrote a book about her visit to Red Square, Moscow, in 1926 titled Kring Röda Torget.

She had two children, including the psychoanalyst Margit Norell (1914-2005). She died in Stockholm, and is buried in the old Örgryte cemetery in Gothenburg.

== Awards and honours ==
In 1921, she received a Salvator medal from Austria.
