= Cornelio August Severinus Doelter =

Puerto Rican-born Austrian geologist

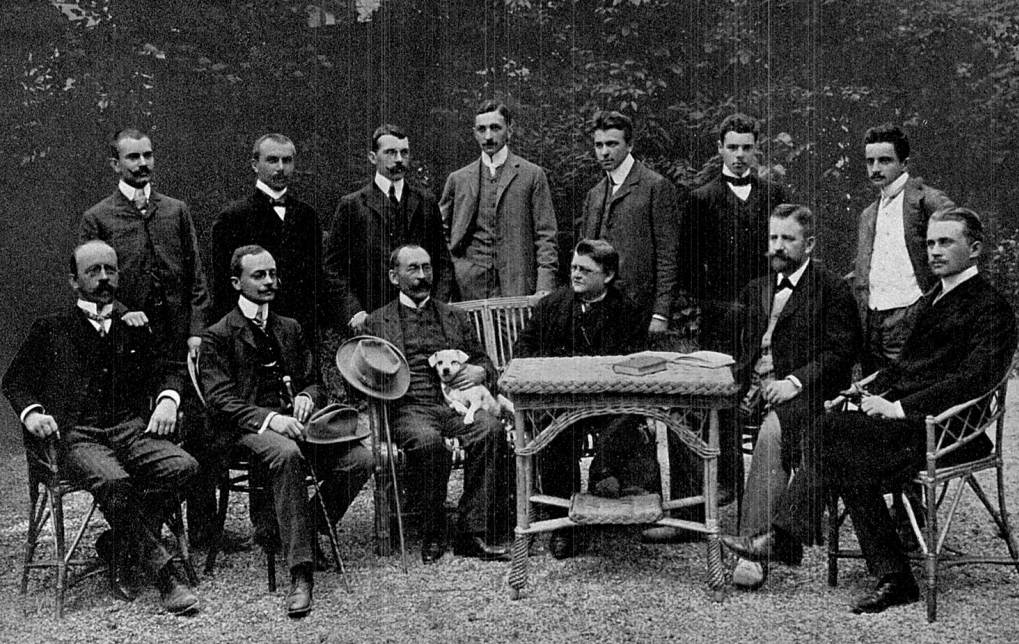
Doelter (sitting with dog on lap) along with colleagues. Standing (L to R) H.H. Reiter, Bruno Trobej, K. Went, St. Lovrekovic, Hofrat Schleimer, Dr Franz Eigel, Franz Folkmann Seated (L to R) Dr Karl Bauer, Rudolf Proboscht, C. Doelter, J.A. Ippen, Dr Adolf Dorler, R. Freiss

Cornelio August Severinus Doelter, Doelter y Cisterich or Cisterich y de la Torre (16 September 1850 – 8 August 1930) was a Caribbean-born Austrian geologist who specialized in chemical mineralogy and petrology, serving as a professor at the Universities of Graz and Vienna. He conducted pioneering experiments in synthetic mineralogy and petrology by melting down rocks and allowing recrystallization of mineral constituents.

== Life and work ==
Doelter was born in Arroyo, Puerto Rico, where his father Carl August managed sugar and coffee plantations that originally belonging to his wife Francisca Maria de Cisterich y de la Torre. His mother was Spanish and his name was originally given as Doelter y Cisterich. The family moved to Karlsruhe in 1855 where Doelter studied at the Lyceum from 1860. From 1865 he studied at the Lycée St. Louis and the Lycée Bonaparte before joining the École Centrale des Arts et Manufactures in 1869. The next year he moved to the University of Freiburg and then Heidelberg. He was influenced by his teachers Robert Bunsen, Johann Friedrich Carl Klein, Ernst Wilhelm Benecke. He received a doctorate in 1872 and then worked with Eduard Suess, Ferdinand von Hochstetter, and Carl Hauer. He joined the Austrian Geological Survey in 1873 and became a professor of mineralogy at the University of Graz in 1876, becoming rector in 1906. In 1907 he moved to the University of Vienna where he succeeded Gustav Tschermak. He worked there until his retirement in 1922.

Doelter's work involved travel in the early years and was involved in a survey of the Pontine Islands (1874), Monte Ferro and Cape Verde (1880-1881), and he described his observations and experiences in his 1884 travelogue. His experimental work involved the synthesis of minerals at high pressure and temperature including nepheline, pyroxenes, micas, and zeolites. He examined the effects of remelting and recrystallization and these went into his 1890 textbook on general mineral chemistry. He studied water of crystallization in the zeolites, examined the physical and chemical laws involved in silicate melting. He later examined the physical properties of silicates and other minerals and suggested theories to explain the nature of electrical conductivity by crystals. In 1906 he published a book Petrogenesis. He also looked at the fluorescences of minerals under radiation from Radium and ultraviolet.

Doelter married Eleonore Fötterle in 1876 and they had a son and daughter. They separated in 1915 and he married Maria Theresia Schilgerius in 1919. He served as an editor for the Naturwissenschaftlicher Verein and was a curator of the Landesmuseum Johanneum.
