= Automotive oil recycling =

Process of recycling used engine and motor oils

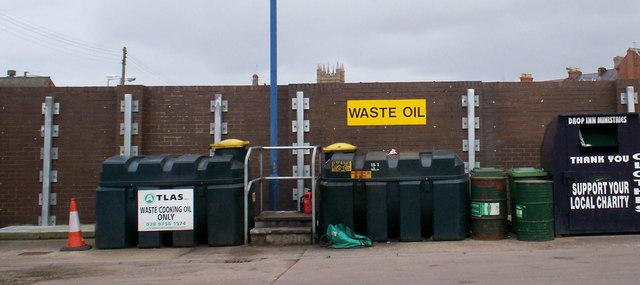
Waste oil collection for recycling at the Fairgreen Amenity Site, Portadown

Automotive oil recycling involves the recycling of used oils and the creation of new products from the recycled oils, and includes the recycling of motor oil and hydraulic oil. Oil recycling also benefits the environment: increased opportunities for consumers to recycle oil lessens the likelihood of used oil being dumped on lands and in waterways. For example, one gallon of motor oil dumped into waterways has the potential to pollute one million gallons of water.

== Motor oil ==
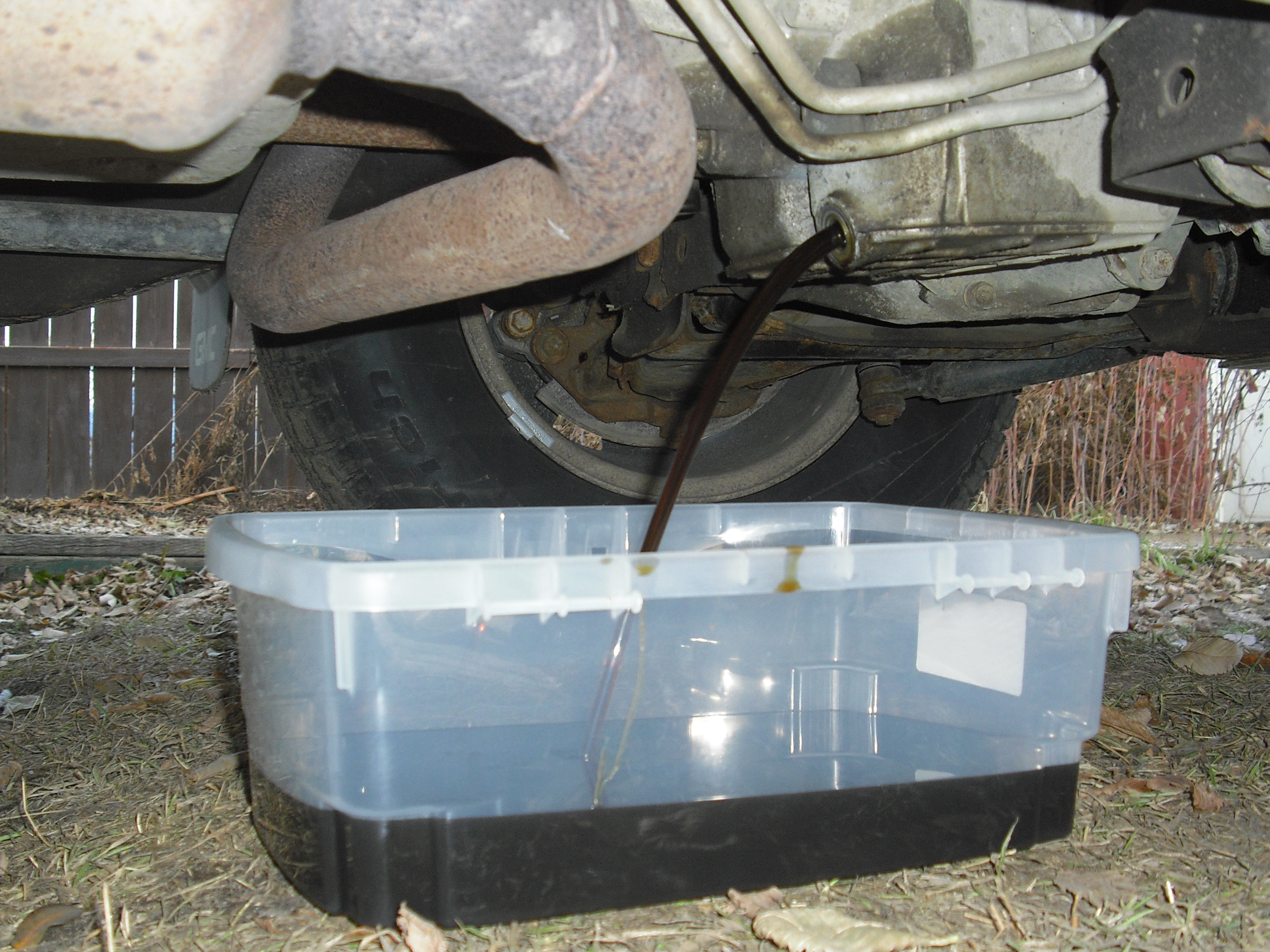
Oil being drained from an automobile

Recycled motor oil can be combusted as fuel, usually in plant boilers, space heaters, or industrial heating applications such as blast furnaces and cement kilns. When used motor oil is burned as fuel it must be burned at high temperatures to avoid gaseous pollution. Alternatively, waste motor oil can be distilled into diesel fuel or marine fuel in a process similar to oil re-refining, but without the final hydrotreating process. The lubrication properties of motor oil persist, even in used oil, and it can be recycled indefinitely.

=== Used motor oil re-refining ===
Used oil re-refining is the process of restoring used oil to new oil by removing chemical impurities, heavy metals and dirt. Used industrial and automotive oil is recycled at re-refineries. The used oil is first tested to determine suitability for re-refining, after which it is dehydrated and the water distillate is treated before being released into the environment. Dehydrating also removes the residual light fuel that can be used to power the refinery, and additionally captures ethylene glycol for re-use in recycled antifreeze.

Next, industrial fuel is separated out of the used oil then vacuum distillation removes the lube cut (that is, the fraction suitable for reuse as lubricating oil) leaving a heavy oil that contains the used oil's additives and other by-products such as asphalt extender. The lube cut next undergoes hydro treating, or catalytic hydrogenation to remove residual polymers and other chemical compounds, and saturate carbon chains with hydrogen for greater stability.

Final oil separation, or fractionating, separates the oil into three different oil grades: Light viscosity lubricants suitable for general lubricant applications, low viscosity lubricants for automotive and industrial applications, and high viscosity lubricants for heavy-duty applications. The oil that is produced in this step is referred to as re-refined base oil (RRBL).

The final step is blending additives into these three grades of oil products to produce final products with the right detergent and anti-friction qualities. Then each product is tested again for quality and purity before being released for sale to the public.

=== REOB ===
The sludge ("residue") associated with engine oil recycling, which collects at the bottom of re-refining vacuum distillation towers, is known by various names, including "re-refined engine oil bottoms" (abbreviated "REOB" or "REOBs").

A report from the U.S. Federal Highway Administration (FHWA) states that:

The oil in a car engine... contains a variety of additives to enhance the vehicle’s performance. These include polymers, viscosity modifiers, heat stabilizers, additional lubricants, and wear additives. The REOB contains all the additives that were in the waste oil as well as the wear metals from the engine (mainly iron and copper). These additives include zinc dialkyldithiophosphate, which contains zinc, sulfur, and phosphorus; calcium phenate, which contains calcium; and molybdenum disulfide, which contains molybdenum and sulfur.

Some producers of asphalt for paving have—openly or secretly—incorporated REOBs into their asphalt, creating some controversy and concern in the traffic engineering community, with some experts suggesting it reduces the durability of the resulting pavement.

== See also ==
- Vegetable oil recycling
- Vehicle recycling
