= List of tar pits =

This is a list of notable tar pits throughout the world. Tar pits, which are often covered with dust and leaves, can trap animals that step into them. Over time, the skeletons of such animals become preserved as fossils. Some of the largest deposits of fossils exist within tar pits.

== List ==
- Binagadi asphalt lake – cluster of tar pits located 1 km southeast from Binagadi settlement, near Hirda-Girrar hillock in urban Baku, Azerbaijan. Fossils from the species of 41 species of mammals, 110 species of birds, 2 reptiles, 1 amphibian and 107 insects recovered from the pits are on display at the Baku Natural-Historical Museum.
- La Brea Tar Pits – group of tar pits around which Hancock Park was formed in urban Los Angeles, California, US. The park is known for producing myriad mammal fossils dating from the Pleistocene epoch, including the La Brea Woman. The George C. Page Museum is dedicated to researching the tar pits and displaying specimens from the animals that died there. See List of fossil species in the La Brea Tar Pits.
- Fort Sill Tar Pits - Located near Fort Sill in SW Oklahoma. It features a pool of asphalt that dates back approximately 280 million years in the Permian Period. Native Americans would use the tar as an ointment for their horses.
- Carpinteria Tar Pits – series of natural asphalt lakes located in Carpinteria, Santa Barbara County, California, US. The tar pits have trapped and preserved hundreds of Pleistocene Age birds and animals but paleontological studies have not been conducted as the tar pits were mined for asphalt for building a coastal highway and afterwards were converted into a local rubbish dump.
- McKittrick Tar Pits – series of natural asphalt lakes situated in McKittrick near Bakersfield, California, US. The tar pits have trapped and preserved many Pleistocene Age animals.
- Pitch Lake – largest natural deposit of asphalt in the world, located at La Brea, Trinidad and Tobago. From this source many of the first asphalt roads of New York City, Washington D.C., and other Eastern U.S. cities were paved. In 1887, Amzi Barber, an American businessman known as "The Asphalt King", secured a monopoly concession over the lake from the British Government that lasted 42 years.
- Lake Bermudez – world's second largest natural tar pit, located at Libertador, Estado Sucre, Venezuela. It is different from other asphalt lakes as it is covered in vegetation. Tar pits of Venezuela have generated interest over the past decade as the source of a rich fossil record that crosses ecosystems and spans millennia, perhaps several ice ages.
- Las Breas de San Felipe – A tar seep in Cuba that has produced fossils of ground sloths, storks and other species.
- Talara Tar Seeps – A site in Peru rich in Pleistocene mammalian predators and neotropical bird remains.

== See also ==
- List of fossil sites
