= Lake Asphalt of Trinidad and Tobago =

Asphalt mining and processing business

- Company type: State owned
- Industry: Asphalt
- Founded: 1851
- Headquarters: Trinidad
- Key people: Garry Solomon, (CEO)
- Website: www.trinidadlakeasphalt.com

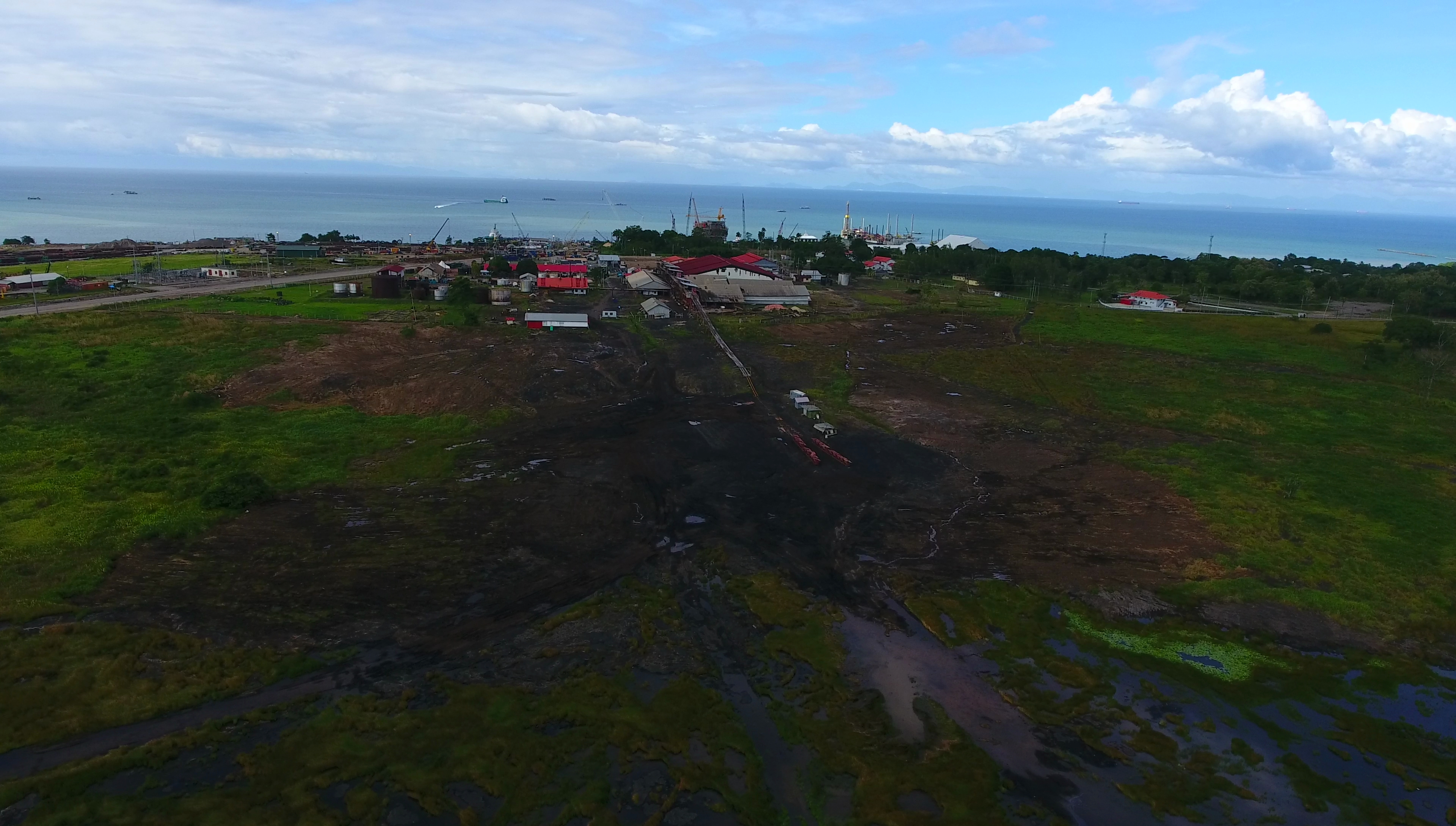
Lake Asphalt operations at Pitch Lake, 2016

Lake Asphalt of Trinidad and Tobago is a company based in La Brea in Trinidad involved in the mining, processing and exporting of asphalt products from the Pitch Lake.

== History ==
The business was founded in 1851 by the tenth Earl of Dundonald who took out a patent for the use of asphalt from the Lake at La Brea. J.W. Previte and A.L Barber later joined the team and in 1888 secured a 21-year concession for the exploitation of the Lake. In 1949 the business was renamed The Trinidad Lake Asphalt Company. Ownership remained with the Previte Company based in the UK which comprised a network approximately 24 public companies around the world through which the asphalt was sold.

The Limmer & Trinidad Lake Asphalt Company became the first contractor to use asphalt from the Lake for road surfacing. In the early 1970s, when the UK market switched to coal tar, asphalt became a much less popular product and the Government of Trinidad and Tobago took ownership of the asphalt extraction business in 1978.

== Operations ==
Asphalt from the Lake is currently sold throughout the world as a modifier for refinery bitumen.
