= Asphalt volcano =

Ocean floor vents that erupt asphalt instead of lava

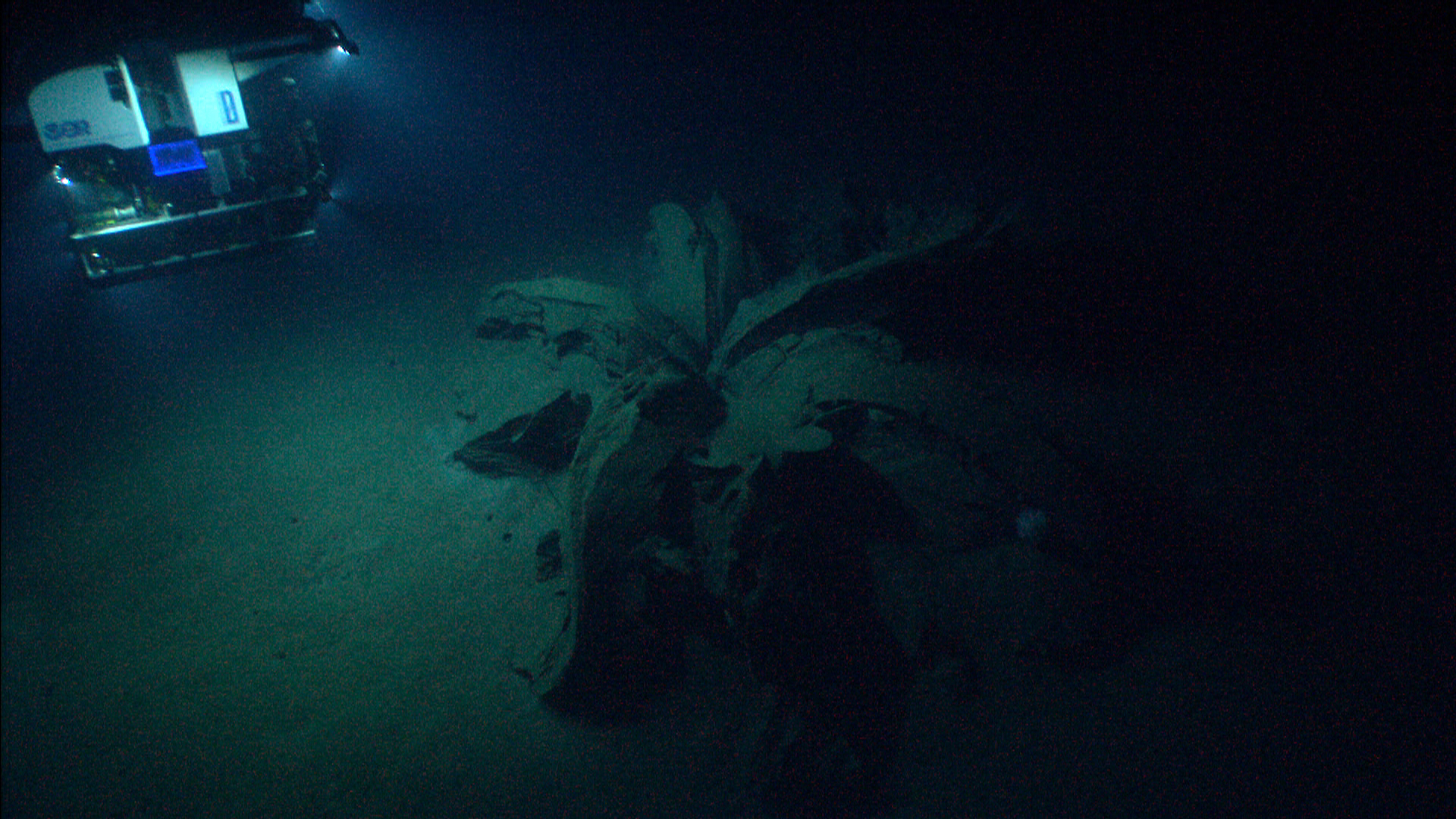
Tar Lily, asphalt volcano, Gulf of Mexico, discovered in 2014

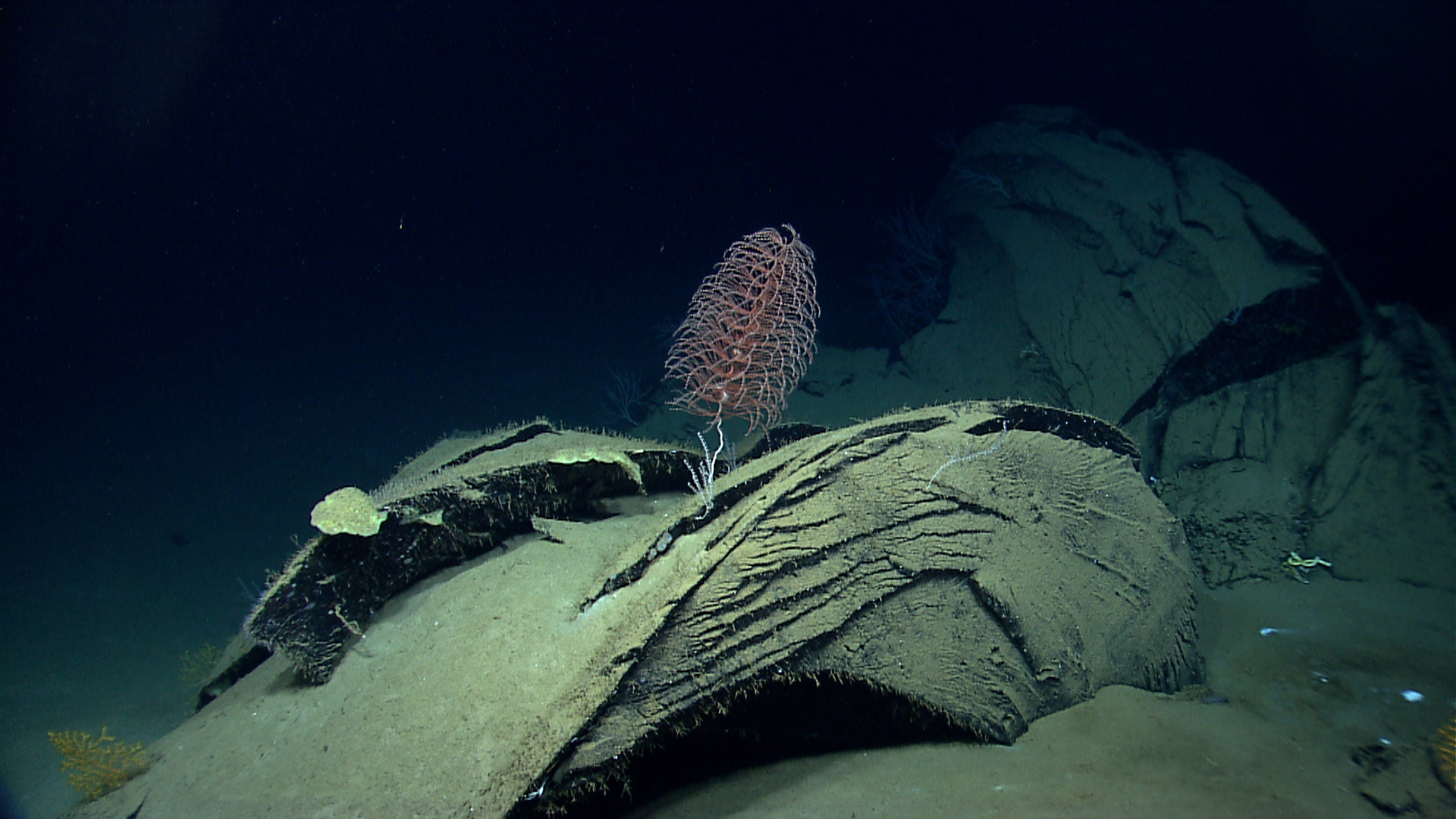
Corals and anemones on asphalt volcano, Gulf of Mexico

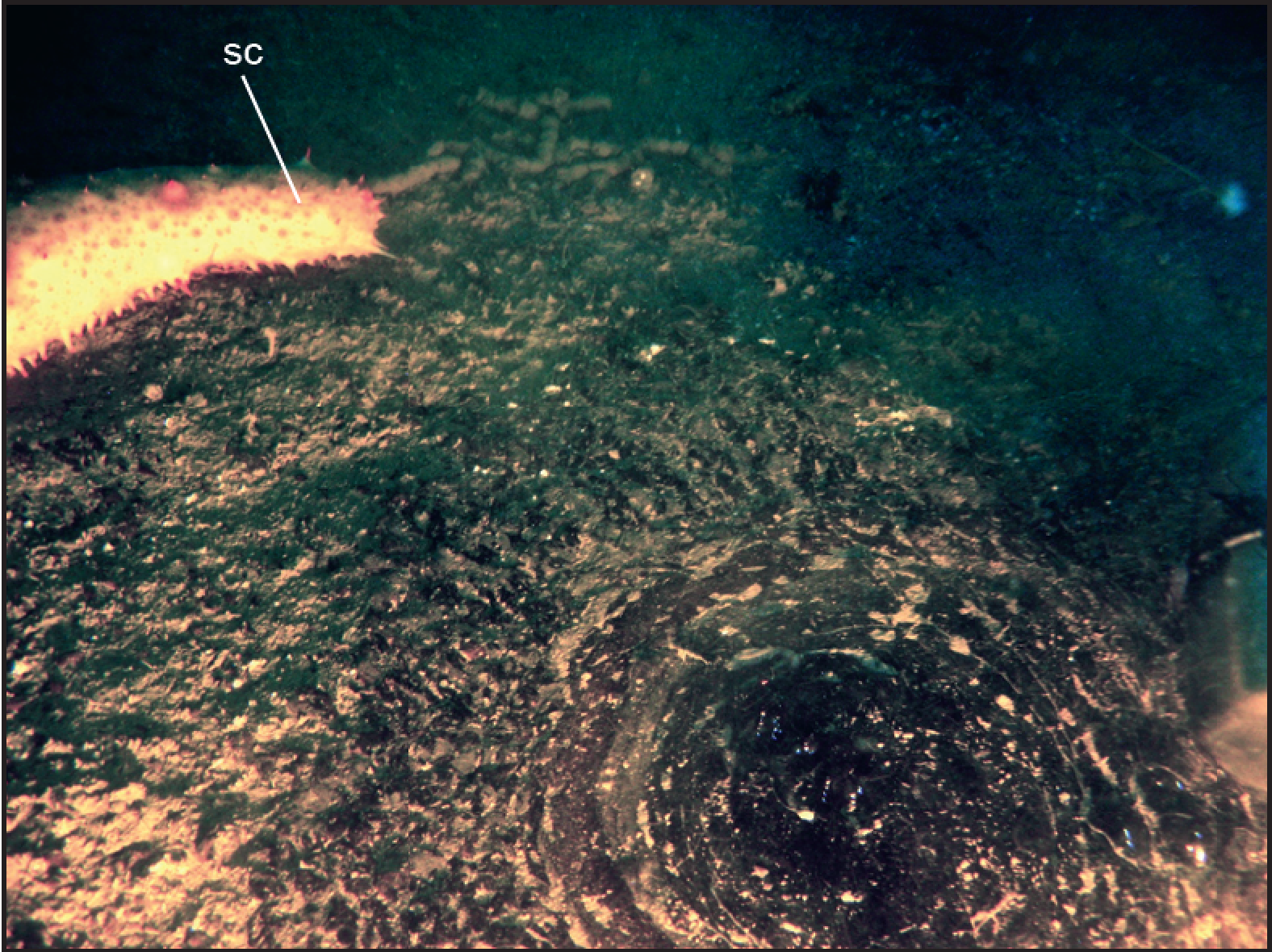
Active, small, viscous asphalt mound in the Santa Barbara Channel, in the Coal Oil Point seep field, and a sea cucumber (sc). Field of view, about 30 × 40 cm.

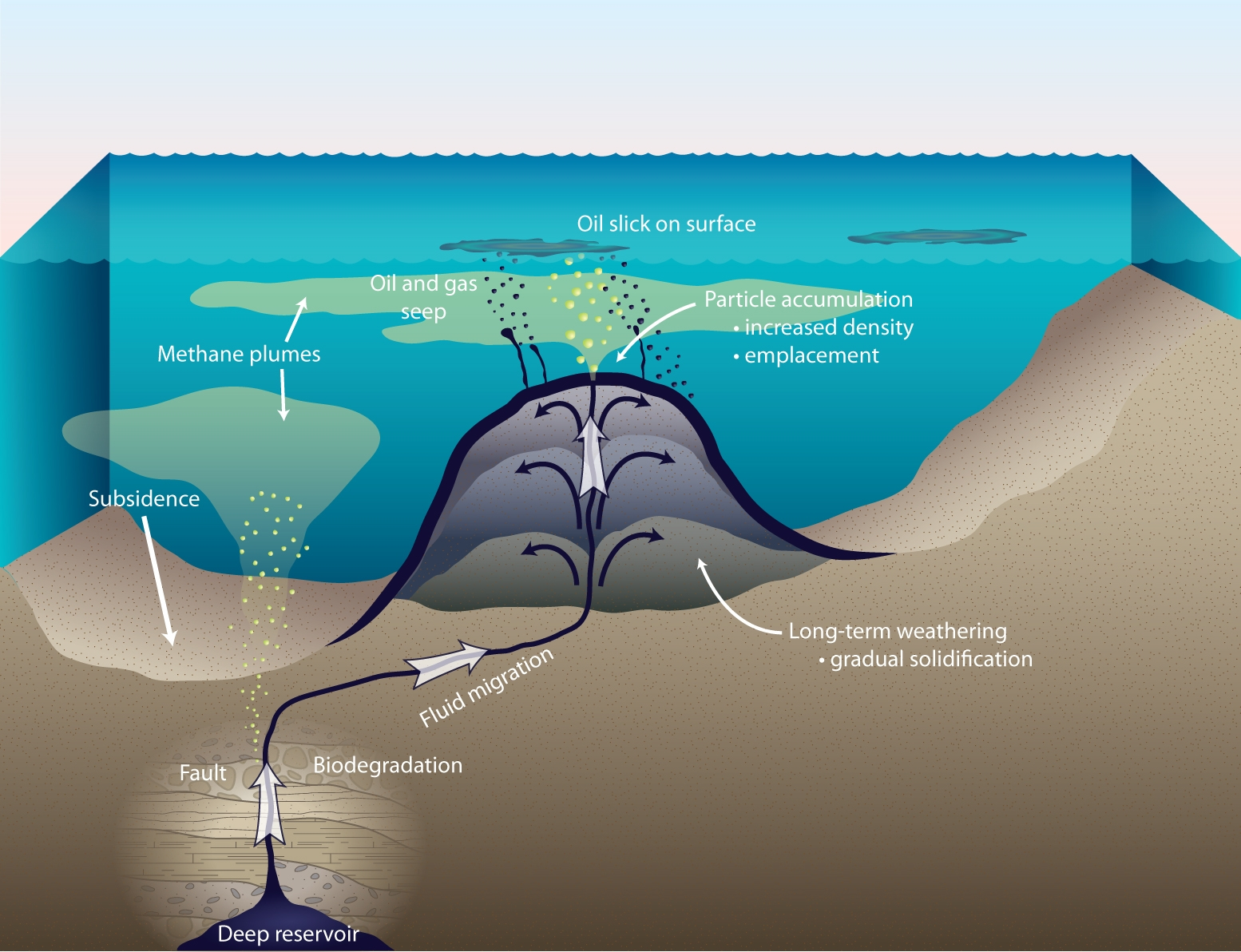
A diagram showing formation of an asphalt volcano and associated release of methane and oil.

Asphalt volcanoes are a rare variety of submarine volcano (seamount). They were unknown before 2003. Several examples have been found along the coasts of the United States and Mexico and elsewhere, some still showing activity. Asphalt volcanoes resemble other seamounts however they are made entirely of asphalt. The structures are thought to form above geologic faults through which petroleum seeps from deeper in the Earth's crust.

== Formation and distribution ==
Asphalt volcanoes are vents on the ocean floor through which asphalt erupts rather than of lava. They were discovered in the Gulf of Mexico during an expedition of the research vessel SONNE, led by Gerhard Bohrmann of the DFG Research Center Ocean Margins. These volcanoes host a previously unknown and highly diverse ecosystem at a water depths of more than 3,000 meters.

The first asphalt volcanoes were discovered in 2003 by a research expedition to the Gulf of Mexico. They are located on a seafloor hill named "Chapopote," Nahuatl for "tar." The site is located in a field of salt domes known as the Campeche Knolls, a series of steep hills formed from salt bodies that rise from underlying rock, a common feature in the gulf. The research team documented tar flows as wide as 20 m (66 ft) across. Also discovered alongside the asphalt were areas soaked with petroleum and methane hydrate, also spewed from the volcano. This kind of an environment proves attractive to chemical-loving bacteria and tubeworms, although the exact biogeochemical relationship is not yet known.

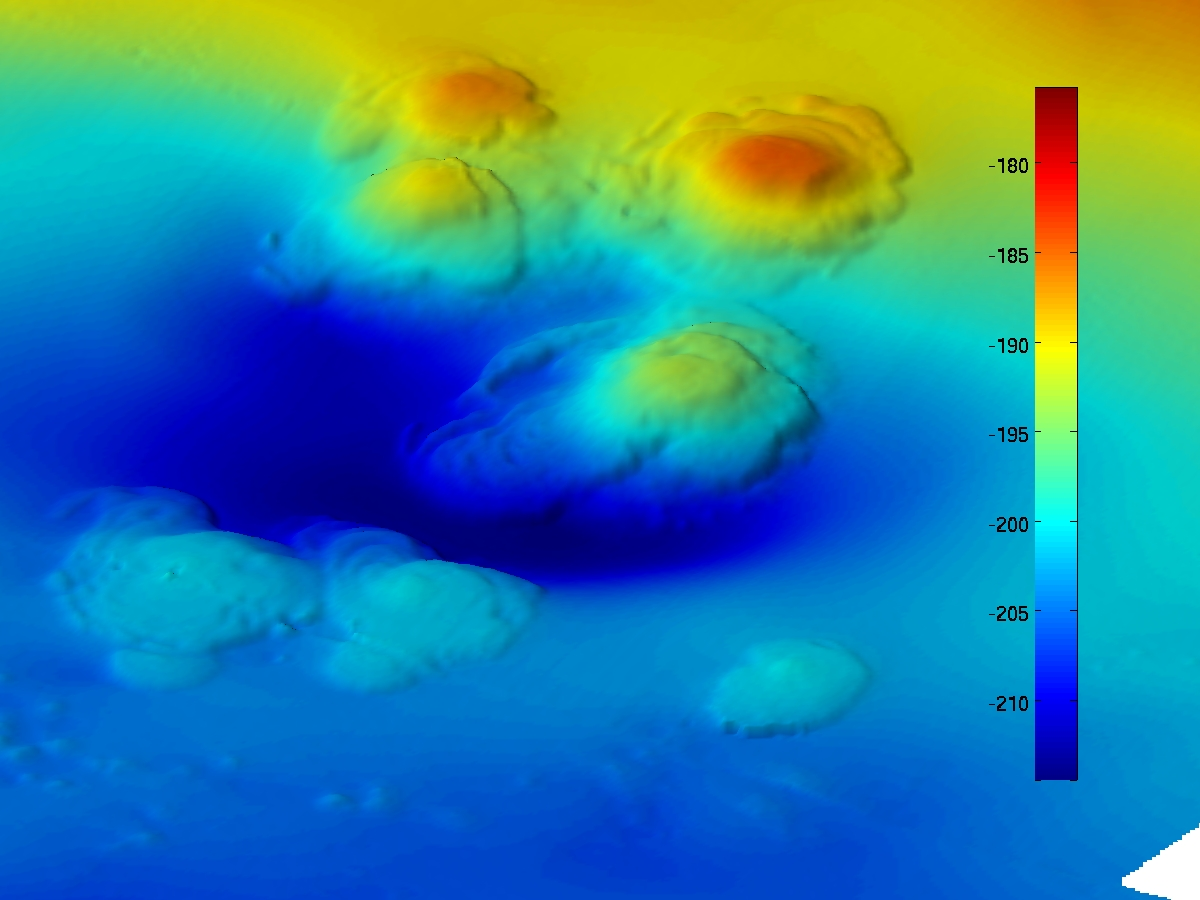
A bathymetric depiction of the seven asphalt volcanoes discovered west of Santa Barbara in 2007.

One hypothesis is that the tar is relatively hot when it comes out of the seafloor, but just like undersea lava flows, it is quickly cooled by the much colder seawater around it. This produces forms similar to the distinctive A'a and pahoehoe types of basalt lava flow seen in places like Hawaii. Another similarity is that the tar heats methane hydrate and causes it to explode into a free gas, similar to the action hot lava has on groundwater in phreatomagmatic eruptions.

The team proposed an asphalt volcano formation theory in a paper published in Eos. The article suggested that water heated past the critical point underneath the seafloor found a passageway to the surface, most likely a salt dome, and carried with it a heavy load of hydrocarbons and dissolved minerals. A special property of such critically heated water is that it can mix with oils, whereas normal water cannot. The same process is attributed to the formation of black smokers. Once the water reaches the surface, it cools, and its carrying capacity drops. The lighter compounds in the mixture escape to the surface, while the tar and other heavier materials remain on the seafloor, eventually building up the asphalt volcano's structure.

The role of temperature in asphalt volcanism is debated, with evidence suggesting asphalt does not erupt in a hot state. Instead, the pāhoehoe-like textures might result from gradients in viscosity, driven by the loss of volatile components, which create a contrast between the flow's outer crust and its inner core.

In 2007, seven more such structures were discovered off the coast of Santa Barbara, California, by a team led by David Valentine. The largest of these domes lies at a depth of 700 ft (213 m). The structures were larger than a football field and about as tall as a six-story building, all made completely out of asphalt. The unusual features were first noted by Ed Keller on bathymetric surveys conducted in the 1990s, and first viewed in 2007, utilizing AUV AUV Sentry and DSV Alvin. Samples were brought up for testing at UC Santa Barbara and the Woods Hole Oceanographic Institution.

Two further dives with DSV Alvin in 2009 and a detailed photographic survey of the area by the autonomous underwater vehicle Sentry showed many similarities to volcanic flows, including flow texture and cracking of the asphalt layers. Carbon dating puts the structures at between 30 and 40 thousand years old. They had at one time been a prolific source of methane. The two largest structures, less than 1 km (1 mi) apart, are pocked by pits and depressions, a sign of methane gas bubbling up long ago. Although the structures are still emitting residual gas, at present the amounts are too small to have any effect. The amount of crude oil in the largest of the structures alone is "enough to fuel my Honda Civic for about half a billion miles. [However] the quality of the material is very poor...It's not worth something like light sweet crude," said Valentine. The petroleum in the structure is more viscous than that which is usually found in underground wells. This is because it has had less time to "bake" under the Earth's heat before being released. In addition, as much as 20% of its mass is made of "junk"—microscopic organisms, sand, and miscellaneous materials that gradually accumulated in the oil.

Analysis of the samples collected from the mounds suggest that they required several decades, even centuries, to build up their current bulk, and that the volcanoes last erupted around 35,000 years ago. In addition they may account for a mysterious spike in oceanic methane concentrations around 35,000 years ago. Methane forms naturally alongside the petroleum underneath the structure, and while petroleum flows have long abated, some residual methane continues to bubble up. This burst of methane would have caused a rapid increase in the population of methane-eating bacteria, which in turn caused a decrease in oxygen in the water, possibly causing a dead zone, in addition to the large amounts of crude oil released into the environment.

The presence of these structures provides a hard surface on which life can grow, as the surrounding ocean floor is generally muddy. This is similar to what happens on seamounts, resulting in their place as an ecological "hub."

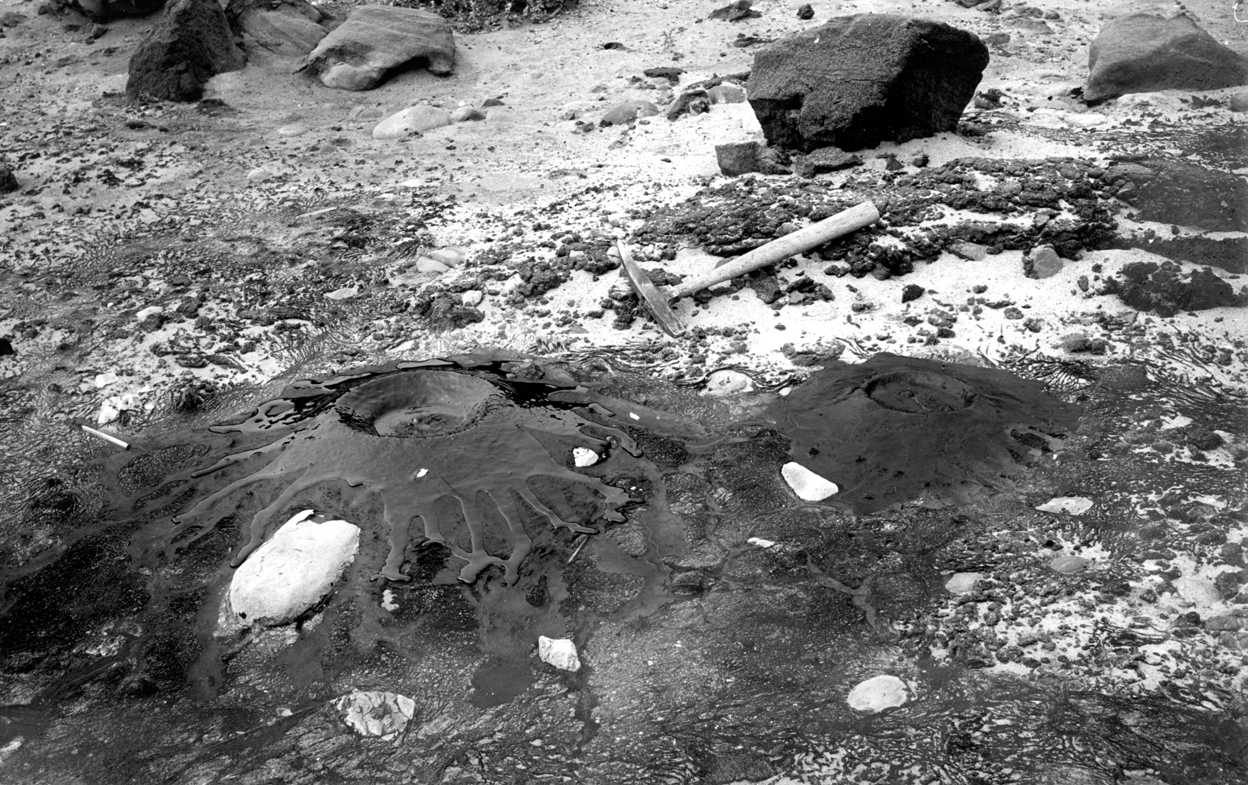
Two small "tar volcanoes" in the old Carpinteria, California, asphalt mine, 1906

== Onshore "tar volcanoes" ==
Onshore "tar volcanoes" have also been observed, for instance in Carpinteria, California, in an asphalt mine. Asphalt exuded from joint cracks in the upturned Monterey shale forming the floor of the mine. Similar structures, the Carpinteria Tar Pits, still form on the beach below Carpinteria.

== See also ==
- Mud volcano
- Petroleum seep
- Pitch Lake
- Pockmark (geology)
