= Campeche Knolls =

Campeche Knolls Campeche Salt Dome Province
- Oceanic basin
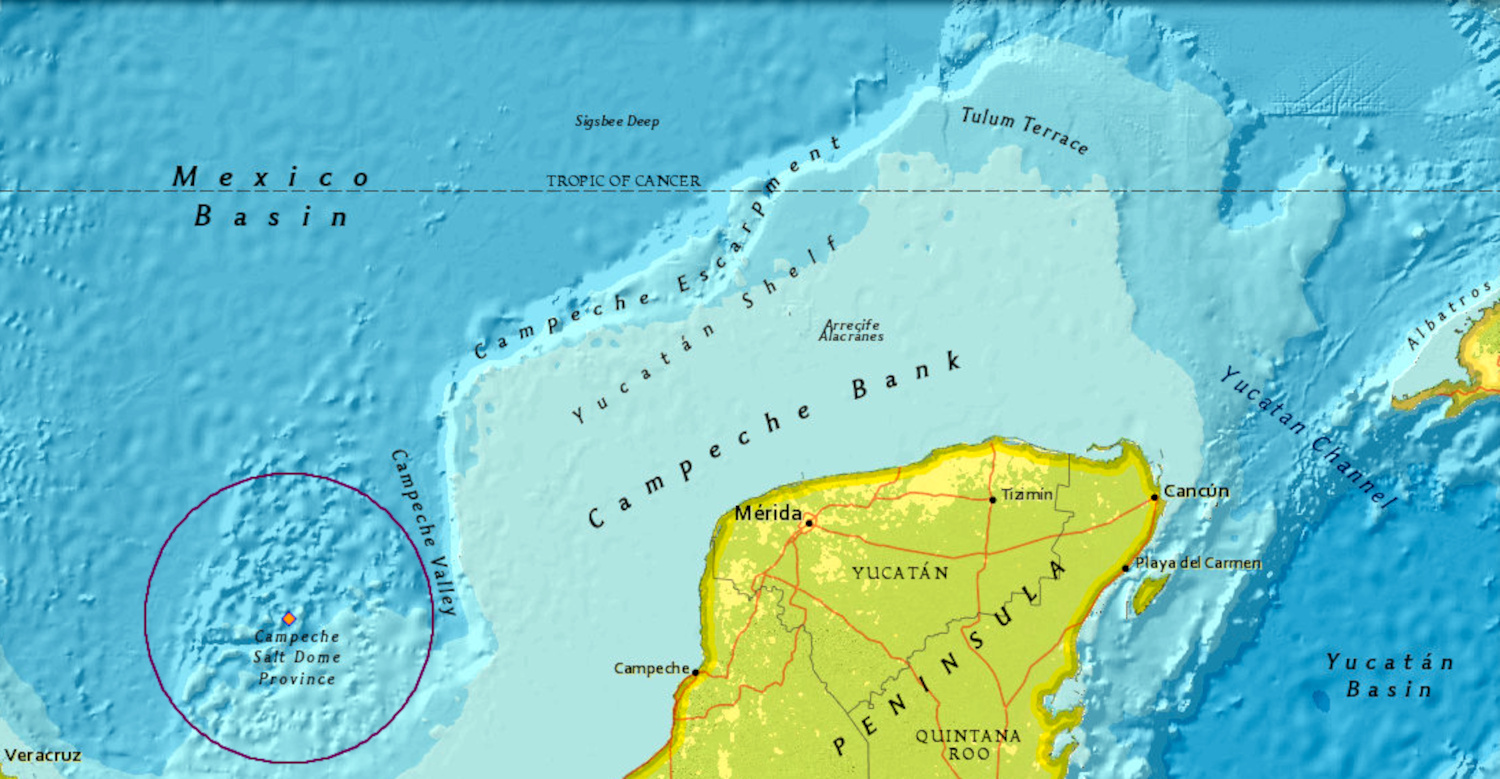
- Campeche Salt Knolls

- Location within Mexico
- Coordinates: 20.366667°N 93.783333°W
- Location: Bay of Campeche; Yucatán Platform
- Part of: Campeche Bank
- Water bodies: Bay of Campeche; Gulf of Mexico

Area
  - Total: 22,653.6 square nautical miles (30,000.0 sq mi; 77,700 km^{2})

Dimensions
  - Length: 260.7 nautical miles (300.0 mi; 482.8 km)
  - Width: 86.9 nautical miles (100.0 mi; 160.9 km)
  - Depth: 672.5 fathoms (4,035 ft; 1,229.9 m) ~ 1,725 fathoms (10,350 ft; 3,155 m)

The Campeche Knolls are diapirs rising from a salt deposit in the southern Gulf of Mexico, separated from the Mississippi-Texas-Louisiana salt province by the Sigsbee Abyssal Plain. Located southeast of the Sigsbee Knolls, the Campeche Knolls are bounded by Campeche Bank to the East, the Bay of Campeche to the South, and the salt-free abyssal plain called the Veracruz Tongue to the West. Salt deposition is inferred to have occurred in the Late Jurassic, during the rifting stage of the gulf, equivalent to the Louann Salt of the Texas-Louisiana slope. Multibeam echosounder images collected during R/V Sonne cruise SO174 show the northern Campeche Knolls as distinct, elongated hills that average 3 by 6 mi (4.8 by 9.7 km) in size, with reliefs of 1,475 to 2,625 ft (450 to 800 m) and slopes of 10 to 20 percent.

The Campeche Knolls are covered with a thick column of sediments above the salt unit, with sediment thickness reaching 3–6 mi (4.8–9.7 km) depending upon water depth and distance from the southern coast. The thick sediments provided prolific petroleum source rocks with the most productive one being of latest Jurassic and Cretaceous age. Hydrocarbon generation makes Campeche Knolls a highly ranked and prolific petroleum region, with studies showing that salt activity supports leakage of gas and oil.

The potential for gas hydrate accumulations in the Campeche Knolls was demonstrated as early as 1970, with the retrieval of gassy cores from Site 88 drilled during Leg 10 of the Deep Sea Drilling Program (DSDP). DSDP Site 88 was drilled to demonstrate that the topographic high seen on profiler records was a salt diapir. During the course of drilling, a significant increase in the gas content of recovered cores to a depth of 108 mbsf (354 fbsf) occurred. Of the five cores recovered, four had high levels of H_{2}S and other natural gases. When these cores were brought on board the ship, irregular degassing characteristics were observed, with the cores emitting very large quantities of gas, estimated to be ten times the volume of the core, that required special measures (i.e. drilling of vent holes in the core liner) to prevent complete disruption of core sediments. Degassing the cores also took an abnormally long time of over two hours. These perplexing results have since led the shipboard researchers to believe that gas hydrates were present in the core and would explain the high volumes of gas locked in the small quantity of water filling the sediment pore spaces and the long degassing time.

During the R/V Sonne SO174 research cruise in 2004, remote sensing results guided researchers to the discovery of oil, gas, and asphalt seepage on the top of one knoll in the northern tip of the Campeche Knolls province. This knoll was named Chapapote, the Aztec word for “tar,” and is located at 21° 54’ N by 93° 26’ W in approximately 1.8 mi (3,000 m) water depth. Extensive surface deposits of solidified asphalt are present at Chapapote, with one subcircular-shaped flow measuring at least 49 ft (15 m) across. A diverse biological community is also present on the Chapapote, with a range of organisms, including tubeworms, bacterial mats, and chemosynthetic mussels all calling the area home. A sample grab conducted on the cruise recovered sediment with thin layers of gas hydrate. Molecular and isotopic compositions of the gas hydrate indicated that the gas was moderately mature and thermogenic in nature.

In 2006, the METEOR Cruise No. 67 (MC67/2b) returned to Chapapote. Hydrates were recovered at one gravity coring station, with Core 10618-1 containing a large piece of pure, white gas hydrate embedded in asphalt. The recovery of this core was accompanied by a strong rising of gas bubbles to the sea surface. It is assumed that hydrate formed internally after deposition of the asphalt. Of the three samples collected from upper first meter of the core, two were composed of Structure I hydrate. The third was a mixture of both Structure I and Structure II. Hydrocarbons from the Chapapote are dominantly thermogenic in origin as evidenced by the stable carbon isotopes of hydrate forming hydrocarbons.

== Importance of Campeche Knolls as a gas hydrates study site ==
The Chapapote asphalt volcano is located in the Campeche Knolls.It was there that the deepest known recovery of surficial gas hydrate occurred at a water depth of 1.8 mi (3,000 m). The gas hydrate was embedded in an asphalt matrix. Analyses of the hydrate showed both Structure-I and Structure-II gas hydrate present in the recovered sample. The only known recovery of gas hydrate in the southern Gulf of Mexico also occurred in the Campeche Knolls.

== See also ==
J. Lamar Worzel
Maurice Ewing
