= Lake Bermudez =

World's second largest natural tar pit in Venezuela in northern South America

Coordinates: 10°07′30″N 62°54′05″W

Overview map, Estado Sucre in northern Venezuela

Situation map, Libertador situated below the Paria peninsula

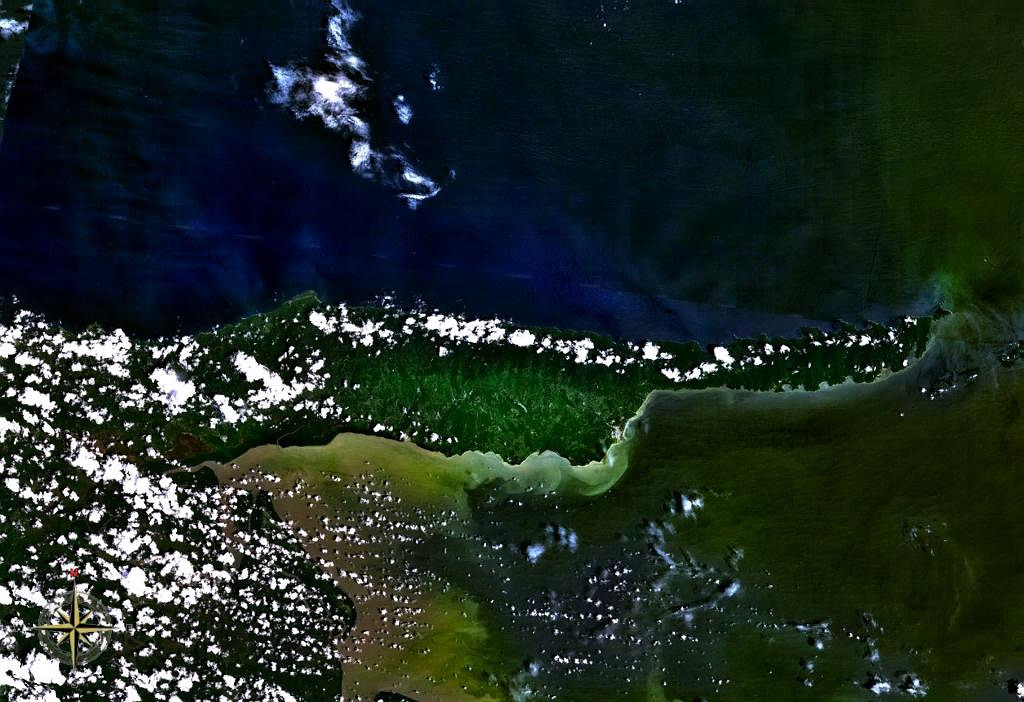
Paria Peninsula seen from space

Lake Guanoco (Spanish: Lago Guanoco or Lago de Asfalto de Guanoco, also Lake Bermudez) is the world's second largest natural tar pit and lies in Venezuela in northern South America.

Lake Guanoco is one of the few natural asphalt lake areas in the world; others are Pitch Lake in Trinidad and Tobago and La Brea Tar Pits (Los Angeles), McKittrick Tar Pits (McKittrick) and Carpinteria Tar Pits (Carpinteria) all located in the US state of California.

== Geography ==
Lake Guanoco lies in Sucre state, about 140 km (87 mi) southeast of Cumaná close to Libertador at the Guanoco River only about 25 km (16 mi) east of the Golfo de Paria.

The asphalt lake has a surface area of about 445 ha (1,100 acres) and the depth varies between 1.5 to 2 m (4.9 to 6.6 ft). Even though Lake Guanoco is larger in area than Trinidad's Pitch Lake, it is smaller in volume; nevertheless its tar is purer. The Instituto Venezolano del Asfalto (INVEAS) estimated the lake contains 75 million barrels of crude.

Lake Guanoco is also different from other asphalt lakes as it is covered in vegetation.

== Geology ==
All asphalt lakes were probably created during the Pleistocene epoch and share the same geological principle.

Asphalt lakes are the largest examples of natural oil seeps. They occur when oil migrating toward the surface as a result of buoyancy (oil is lighter than ground water) actually reaches the surface, instead of being trapped in deeper stratigraphic layers. The reason the petroleum becomes asphaltic, or tarry, is the action of oil-metabolizing bacteria. This process of biodegradation occurs close to the earth's surface, where temperatures are low enough for the bacteria to thrive, and where the oil is surrounded by fresh meteoric water.

== History ==
It is unknown when Lake Guanoco was discovered, it has been known for a long time by the Warao people who used the asphalt to caulk their canoes. Supposedly, Guanoco was the Warao Indian who had discovered the asphalt lake.

In 1799 German Explorer Alexander von Humboldt described the site during his Latin American expedition as "The spring of the good priest" ("Quelle des guten Priesters").

On 15 September 1883, the government of Venezuela granted a 25-year concession to mine asphalt in Lake Bermudez to the American Horacio R. Hamilton. The New York & Bermúdez Company was incorporated in October 1885 and Hamilton assigned his Bermudez concession to the new company in November 1885, and finally approved by the Venezuelan government in December 1885. The area was developed with wharf, stores, buildings, railroad, a refinery and an electric power plant. In December 1888, the concession was extended to ninety-nine years.

New companies playing on contractual grey areas set up shop on the lake starting in 1897. A political struggle followed. President Castro, elected in 1900, definitely broke Hamilton's exclusive rights on the lake.

In 1899 the government under Cipriano Castro put higher taxes on the company; in response the company supported politically the opposing side under Manuel Antonio Matos. The conflict escalated and culminated in 1902–1903 in the "Asphalt War". The political turmoil even led to a temporary interruption in the diplomatic relations with the US between June and December 1908, after Castro had expropriated the company.

In 1934 the commercial mining of the asphalt stopped and has not been re-established since. In 1952, the Creole Petroleum Corporation discovered the field Guanoco-Este while drilling the Guanoco 2 well, but no further development work was initiated.

By 1998, the area was abandoned, underdeveloped, still waiting for the asphalt production to start again.
