= McKittrick Tar Pits =

Asphalt lakes in southern California, US

- McKittrick Tar Pits sign
- Interactive map of McKittrick Tar Pits
- Location: State Hwy 33 (P.M. 33. 5) and State Hwy 58, in McKittrick, California
- Coordinates: 35°17′47″N 119°37′34″W

California Historical Landmark
- Official name: McKittrick Tar Pits
- Designated: February 4, 1951
- Reference no.: 498

Overview map, Kern County in southern California

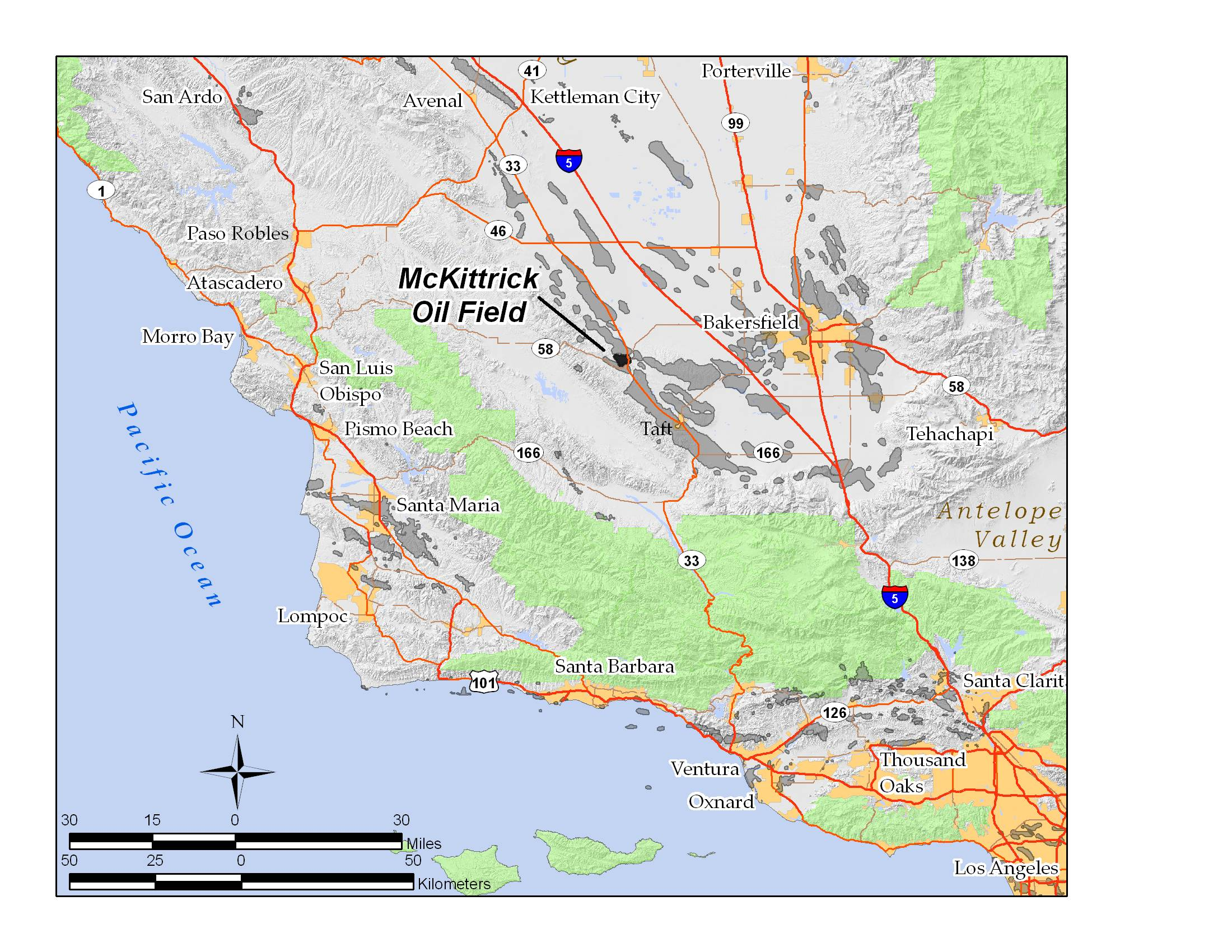
The McKittrick Oil Field area. Other oil fields in light gray.

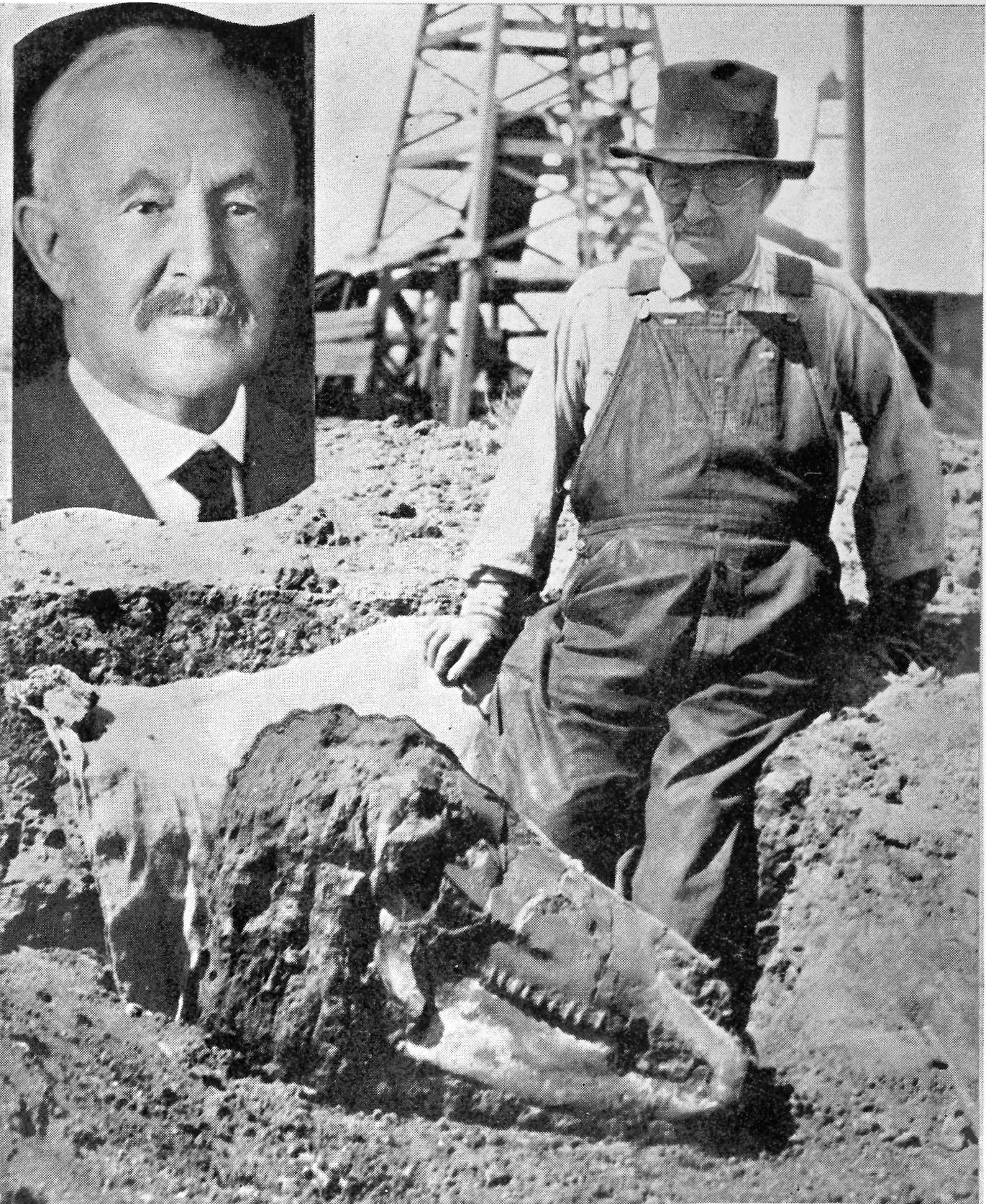
Fossil horse skull found in the McKittrick Tar Pits by Charles H. Sternberg, around 1926.

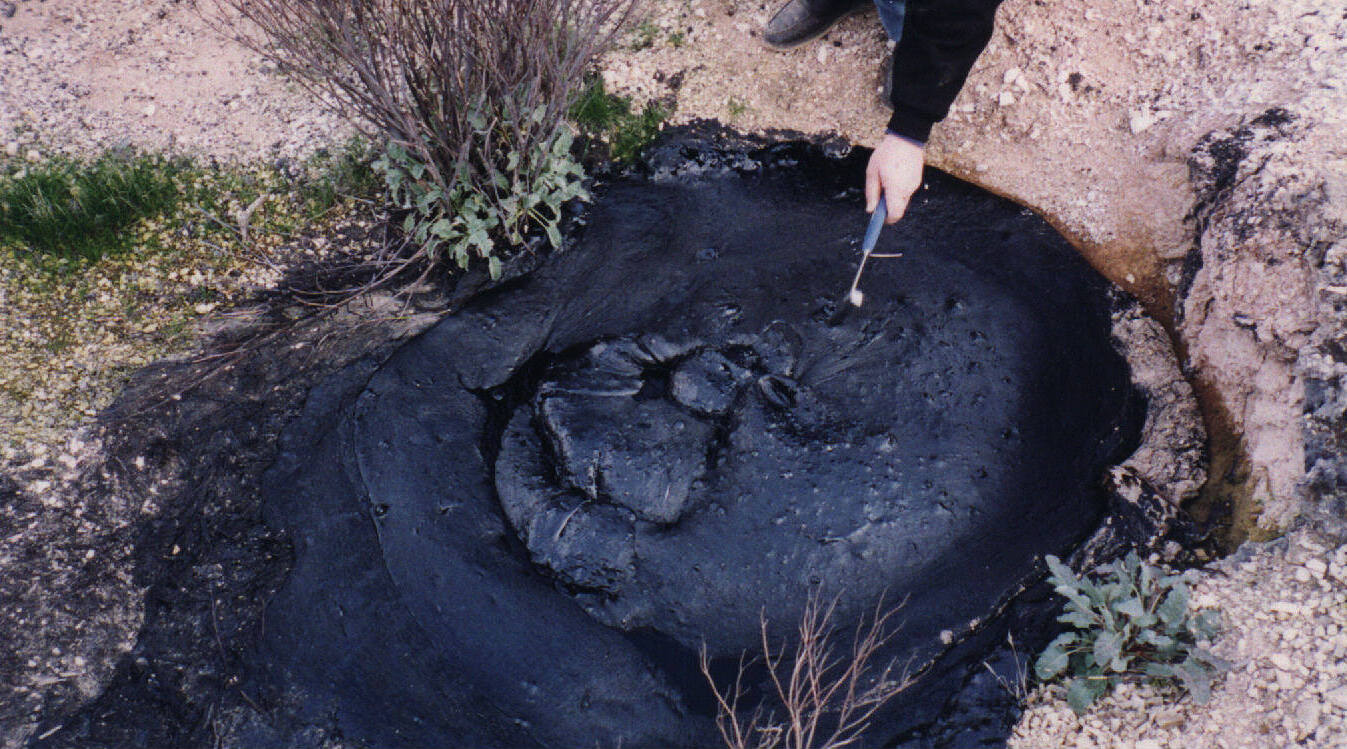
Tar seep north of Highway 58

The McKittrick Tar Pits (also McKittrick Oil Seeps and McKittrick Brea Pits) are a series of natural asphalt lakes situated in the western part of Kern County in southern California. The pits are the most extensive asphalt lakes in the state.

The McKittrick Tar Pits are one of the five natural asphalt lake areas in the world, the others being Tierra de Brea in Trinidad and Tobago, Lake Guanoco in Venezuela and the La Brea Tar Pits (Los Angeles) and Carpinteria Tar Pits (Carpinteria) both also located in the US state of California.

== Geography ==
The McKittrick Tar Pits are located in the southern part of the San Joaquin Valley about 50 km (31 mi) west of Bakersfield and 0.8 km (0.50 mi) south of the town of McKittrick.

Most of the tar pits are located along the southwestern part of the intersection of California State Route 58 and 33 and generate from the underlying McKittrick Oil Field. The pits stretch over a distance of about 6.5 km (4.0 mi).

== Geology ==
The asphalt lakes of the McKittrick area were probably created during the Pleistocene epoch and share the same geological principle as other asphalt lakes.

The creation of an asphalt lake is related to deep faults, often between two tectonic plates. In connection with motion along the plates or subduction, pressure is created against underlying oil source rock, in this case the Monterey Formation.

The oil moves towards the surface and slowly transforms into bitumen and on its way picks up clay and water, and is cooled into asphalt. Lighter hydrocarbon fractions volatilize on contact with the atmosphere, leaving behind the heavier fractions, which are principally asphaltum.

Fossils that have been unearthed here include many species of American lions, short-faced bears, red deer, saber-toothed cats, ground sloths, bison, mammoths, many species of birds, and numerous species of insects.

== History ==
The McKittrick Tar Pits were known by the Native American Yokuts people who mined the asphalt and used it as a sealant for waterproofing, decoration, and even for trade.

In the 1860s, San Joaquin Valley settlers mined the tar pits both from open pits and shafts and the first commercial exploitation occurred by the "Buena Vista Petroleum Company".

The tar pits have trapped and preserved hundreds of Pleistocene Age animals The first paleontological studies were conducted between 1900 and 1910, in 1928 the first major studies were conducted by a paleontological team from the University of California, the excavations were completed in 1949 by teams from the Natural History Museum of Los Angeles County and the Kern County Museum. By 1968, more than 43 different mammals and 58 different birds had been identified.

On June 29, 1952, the McKittrick Tar Pits were registered a California Historical Landmark.

California Historical Landmark reads:

- NO. 498 McKITTRICK BREA PIT - Located one-eighth mile west of here is an ancient asphaltum seepage in which hundreds of Pleistocene Age (15,000-50,000 years ago) birds and animals were trapped. The site was first explored in 1928 by the University of California - excavation was completed in 1949 by the Los Angeles and Kern County museums.

== See also ==
- California Historical Landmarks in Kern County
- California Historical Landmark
