= Limmer Holdings =

- Industry: Construction
- Founded: 1881
- Defunct: 1971
- Fate: Acquired
- Successor: Tarmac
- Headquarters: London, UK
- Key people: Sir William Barnes, (Chairman)

Limmer Holdings was a major contracting business based in London.

== History ==
The Company was founded circa 1881 as the Limmer & Trinidad Lake Asphalt Company with the objective of undertaking road contracting using high quality asphalt from Limmer in Germany and from the Pitch Lake in Trinidad. The company was based in Carnwarth Road in Fulham and secured major contracts for surfacing the roads of London. The asphalt was imported and the stone came by barge from Scotland. The Company was acquired by Tarmac in 1971.
