= Carpinteria Tar Pits =

Natural asphalt lakes in Carpinteria, California, US

Coordinates: 34°23′30.98″N 119°31′16.44″W

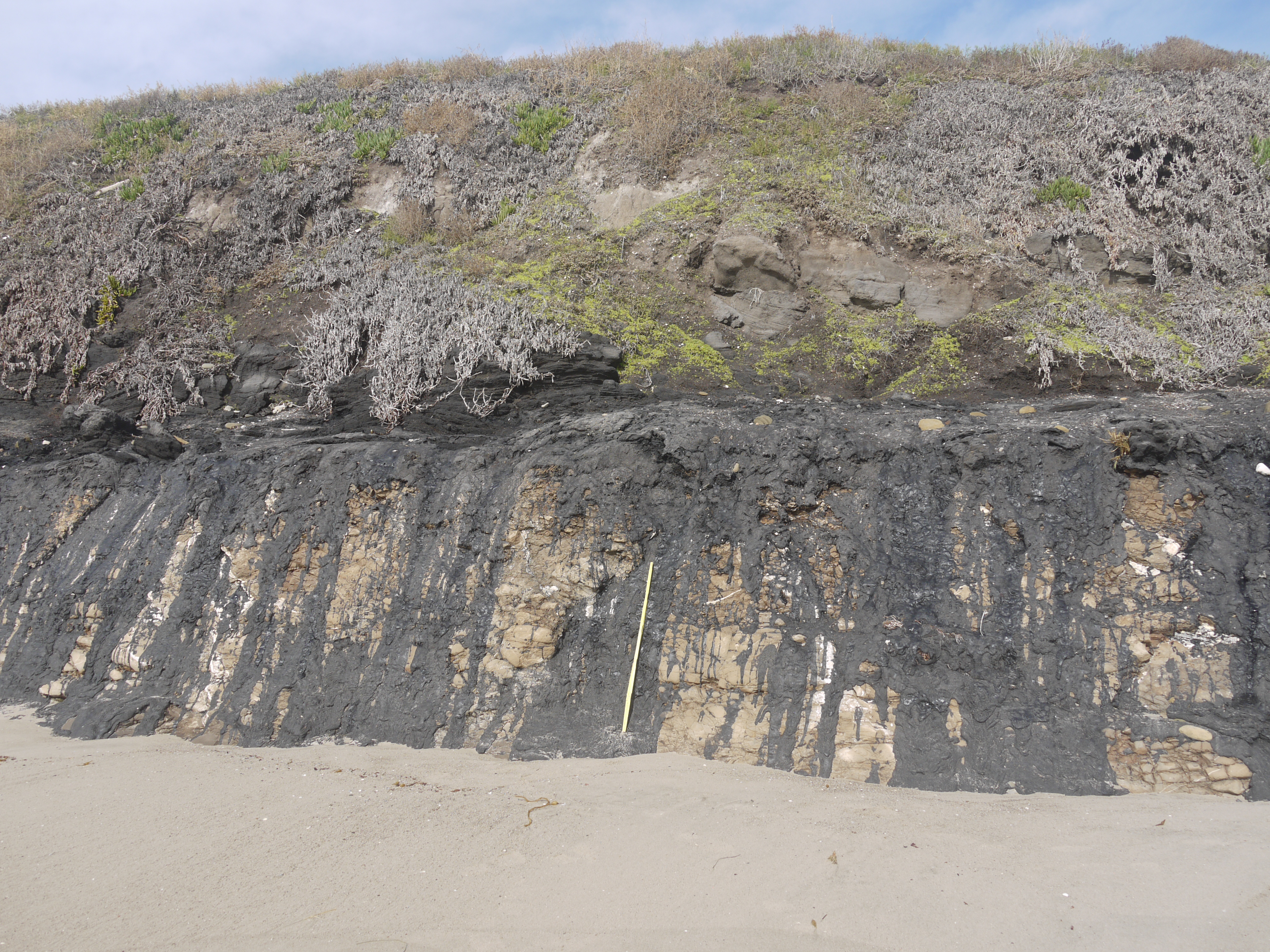
Layers of stone, sand and tar at Carpinteria State Beach. Heavy oil overflowing outcrop. Yellow vertical ruler is 1m

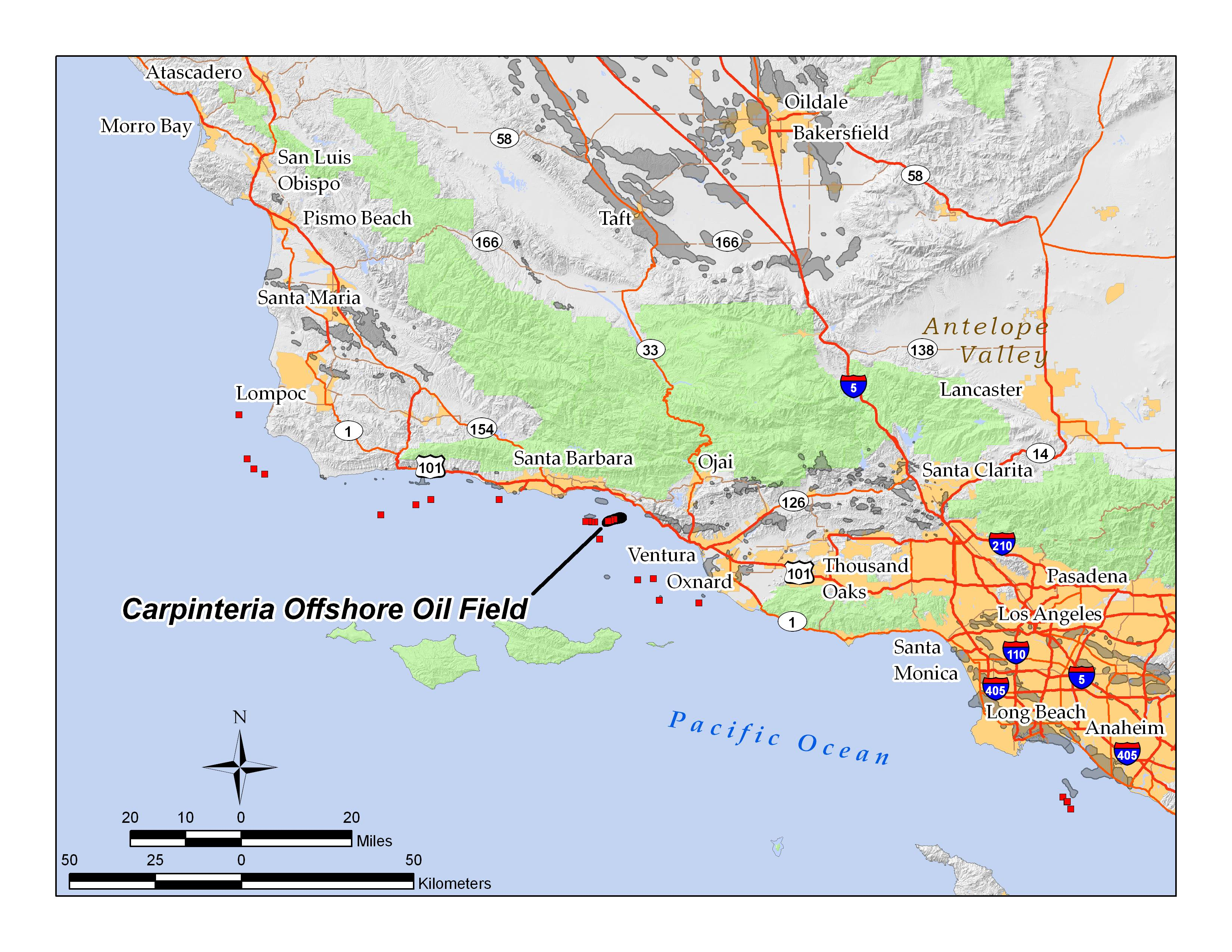
The Carpinteria Offshore Oil Field area

Overview map, Santa Barbara County in southern California

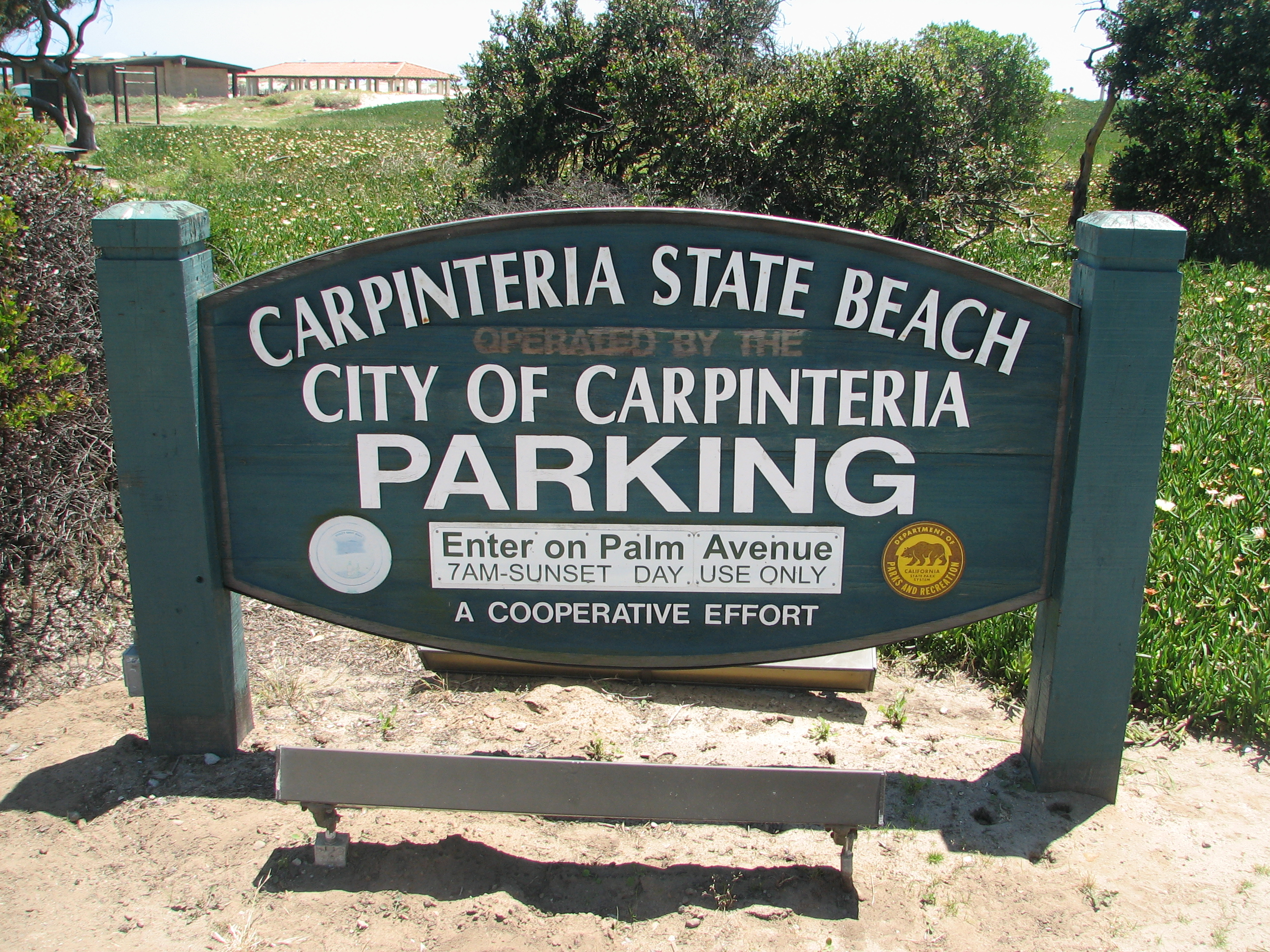
Carpinteria State beach sign

The Carpinteria Tar Pits (also Carpinteria Oil Seeps) are a series of natural asphalt lakes situated in the southern part of Santa Barbara County in southern California, US.

The Carpinteria Tar Pits are a natural asphalt lake areas similar to Tierra de Brea Trinidad and Tobago, Lake Guanoco in Venezuela and the La Brea Tar Pits (Los Angeles) and McKittrick Tar Pits (McKittrick) both also located in the US state of California. These pits are all characterized by the large asphalt-based areas that seem to have trapped hundreds of fossils and slowed down decay over time.

== Geography ==
The Carpinteria Tar Pits are located in the southeastern extremity of Santa Barbara County about 20 km (12 mi) southeast of Santa Barbara in the town of Carpinteria.

The area is a designated park, the Tar Pits Park, and lies within the Carpinteria State Beach area in the southern part between the Santa Rosa and the San Miguel campsites. Most of the tar pits are located along a short stretch directly on the beach and generate from the underlying Carpinteria Offshore Oil Field.

== Geology ==
The Carpinteria Tar Pits most likely date from the Pleistocene epoch.

The creation of an asphalt lake is typically the result of upwards migrations of hydrocarbons along a geologic fault. Additionally, in connection with subduction pressure can be created against underlying oil source rock.

The oil moves towards the surface and slowly transforms into bitumen; on the way through the lithosphere, it picks up clay and water and is cooled into asphalt.

The Carpinteria pits are one of two in southern California. Although the La Brea pit is more well known, Carpinteria is both older and larger. Both pits were created in the same way, via this subduction along the San Andreas fault.

The fossils collected here are that of more moderate temperature species such as ferns, indicating the climate of this region may have been much more temperate than what it is today.

== History ==
The Carpinteria Tar Pits were known to the Chumash people, who mined the asphalt and used it as a sealant for waterproofing their tomols (plank-built boats) and other purposes.

The area was named "La Carpinteria" (the carpentry) by a Spanish expedition under explorer Gaspar de Portolá, which arrived in the area on August 17, 1769. Initially, these tar pits were drilled for oil due to their ease of access of the natural resource. Starting around 1915, the tar pits were mined and the asphalt was used for building a coastal highway. In 1933, the area was designated a state beach and in 1941 it was formally opened to the public and all commercial activity stopped.

The tar pits have trapped and preserved hundreds of Pleistocene Age Mammals and birds. Some findings are on display at the Carpinteria Valley Museum of History, but no paleontological studies have been conducted because the tar pits were used as a local rubbish dump.

== See also ==
- Petroleum seep
- Asphalt volcano
- Coal Oil Point seep field
