= Pitch Lake =

Largest natural deposit of asphalt in the world, located in Trinidad and Tobago

Coordinates: 10°13′57″N 61°37′41″W

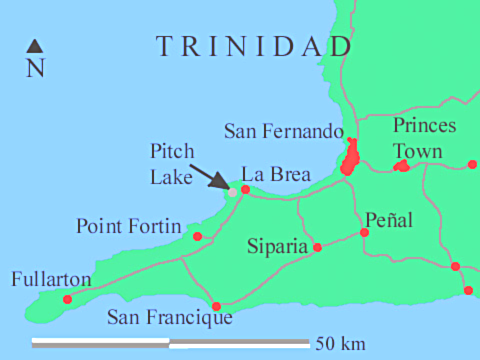
Map showing location of the Pitch Lake

The Pitch Lake is the largest natural deposit of bitumen in the world, estimated to contain 10 million tons. It is located in Trinidad and Tobago, more specifically in La Brea in southwest Trinidad, within the Siparia Regional Corporation. The lake covers about 0.405 square kilometres (100 acres) and is reported to be 76.2 metres (250 feet) deep.

Pitch Lake is a popular tourist attraction, including a small museum, from where official tour guides can escort people across the lake. The lake is mined for asphalt by Lake Asphalt of Trinidad and Tobago.

== History ==
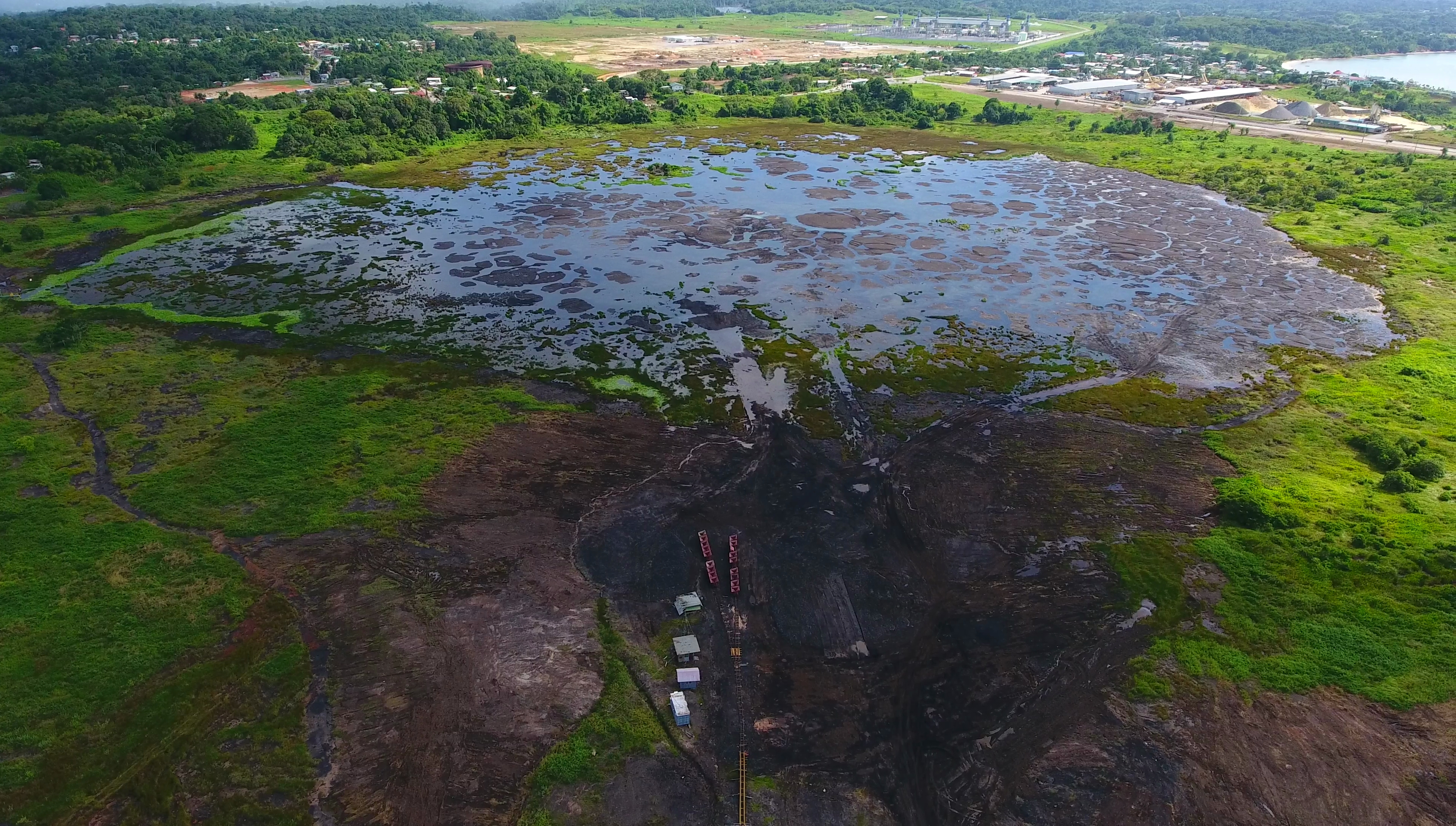
Pitch Lake, 2016

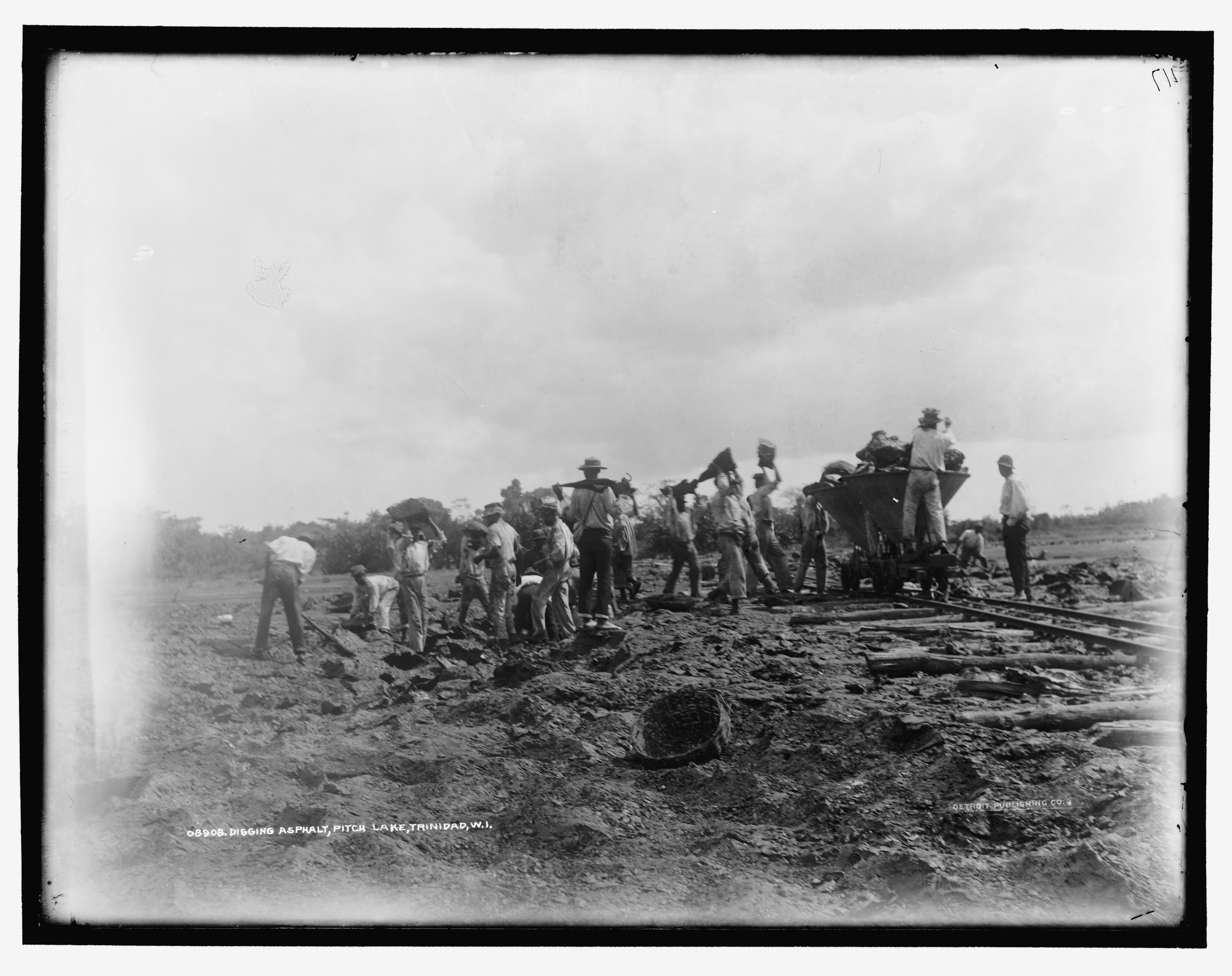
Pitch Lake, c. 1890

The Pitch Lake has fascinated explorers and scientists, attracting tourists since its discovery by Sir Walter Raleigh in his expedition there in 1595. Raleigh himself found immediate use for the asphalt to caulk his ship. He referred to the pitch as "most excellent... It melteth not with the sun as the pitch of Norway". Raleigh was informed of the lake’s location by the native Amerindians, who had their own story about the origin of the lake. The story goes that the indigenous people were celebrating a victory over a rival tribe when they got carried away in their celebration. They proceeded to cook and eat the sacred hummingbird which they believed possessed the souls of their ancestors. According to legend, their winged god punished them by opening the earth and conjuring the pitch lake to swallow the entire village, and the lake became a permanent stain and a reminder of their sins. The local villages believe this legend due to the many Amerindian artifacts and a cranium that have been discovered, preserved, in the pitch.

In the 1840s, Abraham Pineo Gesner first obtained kerosene from a sample of Pitch Lake bitumen.

In 1887, Amzi Barber, an American businessman known as "The Asphalt King", secured a 42-year monopoly concession from the British Government for the Pitch Lake for his company, Barber Asphalt Paving Company. It was from this source that many of the first asphalt roads of New York City, Washington D.C., and other Eastern U.S. cities were paved.

== Geology ==
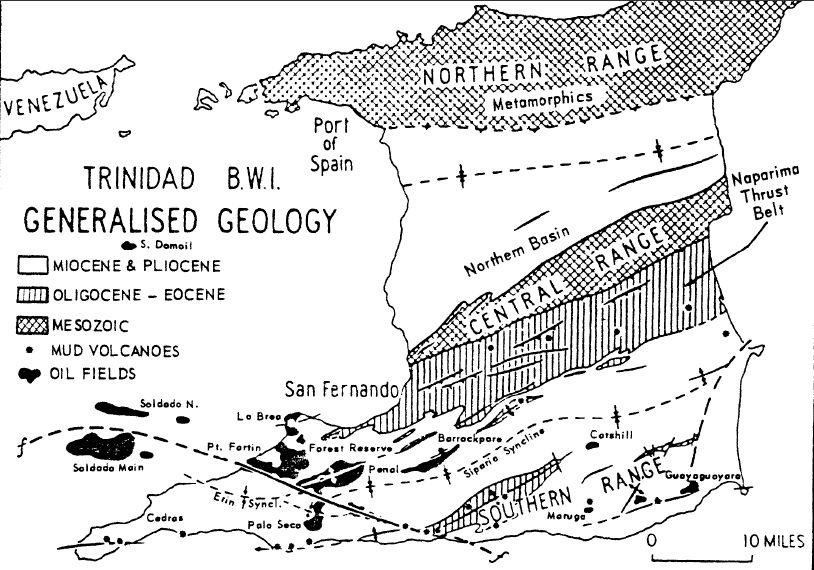
Generalized geological map of Trinidad. The Los Bajos wrench fault cuts across the southwest portion of the island.

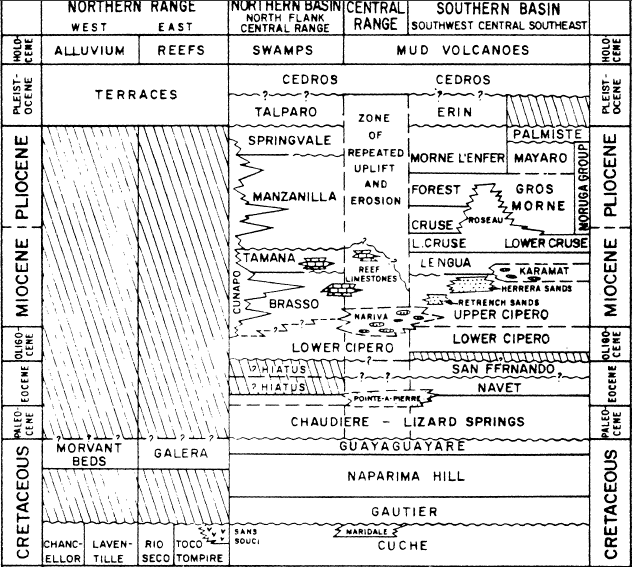
Stratigraphic Column for Trinidad

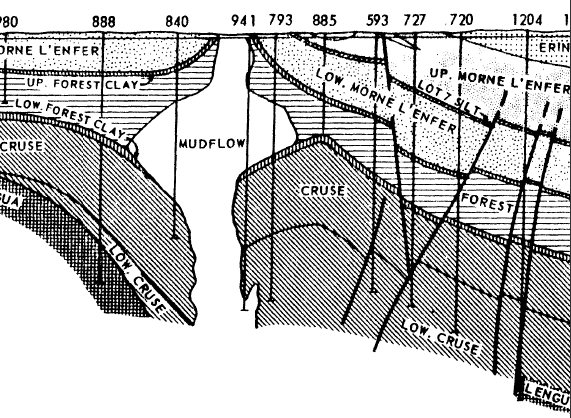
North-South Cross Section of the Forest Reserve Field

The origin of Pitch Lake is related to deep faults in connection with subduction under the Caribbean Plate related to Barbados Arc. The lake has not been studied extensively, but it is believed that the lake is at the intersection of two faults, which allows oil from a deep deposit to be forced up. The lighter elements in the oil evaporate under the hot tropical sun, leaving behind the heavier asphalt. Bacterial action on the asphalt at low pressures creates petroleum in asphalt. The researchers indicated that extremophiles inhabited the asphalt lake in populations ranging between 10^{6} and 10^{7} cells/gram. The Pitch Lake is one of several natural asphalt lakes in the world, including La Brea Tar Pits (Los Angeles), the McKittrick Tar Pits (McKittrick) and the Carpinteria Tar Pits (Carpinteria) in the U.S. state of California, and Lake Guanoco in the Republic of Venezuela.

The regional geology of southern Trinidad consists of a trend of ridges, anticlines with shale diapiric cores, and sedimentary volcanoes. According to Woodside, "host muds and/or shales become over pressured and under compacted in relation to the surrounding sediments...mud or shale diapirs or mud volcanoes result because of the unstable semi-fluid nature of the methane-charged, undercompacted shales/muds." The mud volcanoes are aligned along east-northeast parallel trends. Woodside goes on to say, "The Asphalt Lake at Brighton represents a different kind of sedimentary volcanism in which gas and oil are acting on asphalt mixed with clay. This asphalt lake cuts across Miocene/Pliocene formations overlying a complicated thrust structure."

The first wells were drilled into Pitch Lake oil seeps in 1866. Kerosene was distilled from the pitch in the lake from 1860 to 1865. The Guayaguayare No. 3 well was drilled in 1903, but the first commercial well was drilled at the west end of the lake in 1903. Oil was then discovered in Point Fortin-Perrylands area, and in 1911, the Tabaquite Field was discovered. The Forest Reserve Field was discovered in 1914 and the Penal Field in 1941. The first offshore well was drilled in 1954 at Soldado.

== Microbiology ==
Evidence of an active microbiological ecosystem in Pitch Lake has been reported. The microbial diversity was found to be unique when compared to microbial communities analyzed at other hydrocarbon-rich environments, including La Brea tar pits in California, and an oil well and a mud volcano in Trinidad and Tobago. Archaeal and bacterial communities co-exist, with novel species having been discovered from Pitch Lake samples. Researchers have also observed novel fungal life forms which can grow on the available asphaltenes as a sole carbon and energy source. The microbiological activity is accompanied by a stronger evolution of gas consisting principally of methane with a considerable proportion of carbon dioxide, and which also contains hydrogen sulphide.

== See also ==
- Notable tar pits
- List of tar pits
- Asphalt volcano
