= La Brea, Trinidad and Tobago =

Town in southwestern Trinidad

Coordinates: 10°15′N 61°37′W

La Brea
- Town
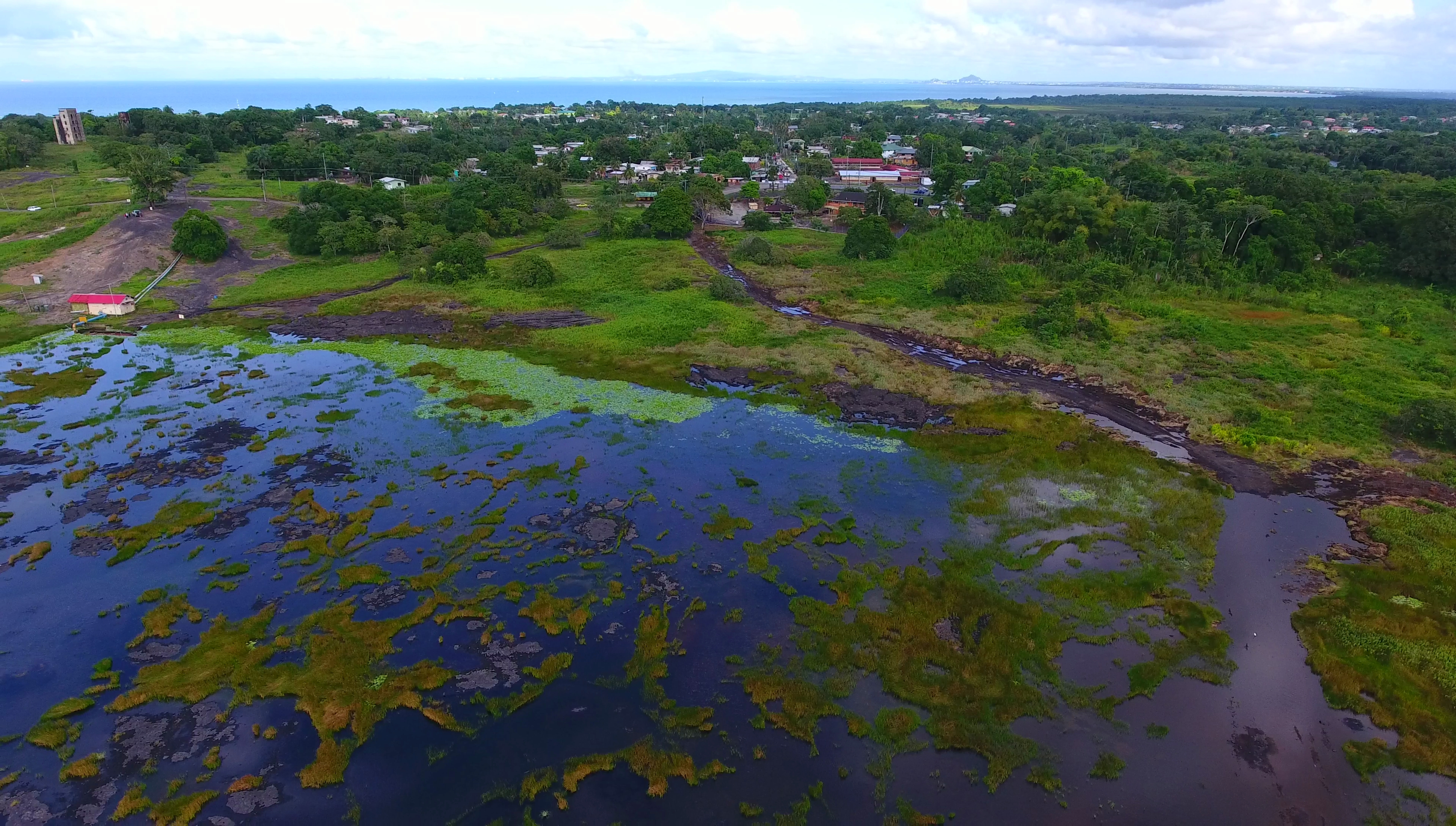
- La Brea
- Interactive map of La Brea
- Corporation: Siparia Regional Corporation
- Country: Trinidad and Tobago
- Ranked
- Time zone: UTC−4 (AST)
- Area codes: 648, 651

La Brea is a town in southwestern Trinidad, located northeast of Point Fortin and southwest of San Fernando. La Brea (Spanish for "the tar" or "the pitch") is best known as the site of the Pitch Lake, a natural asphalt lake.

== Location ==
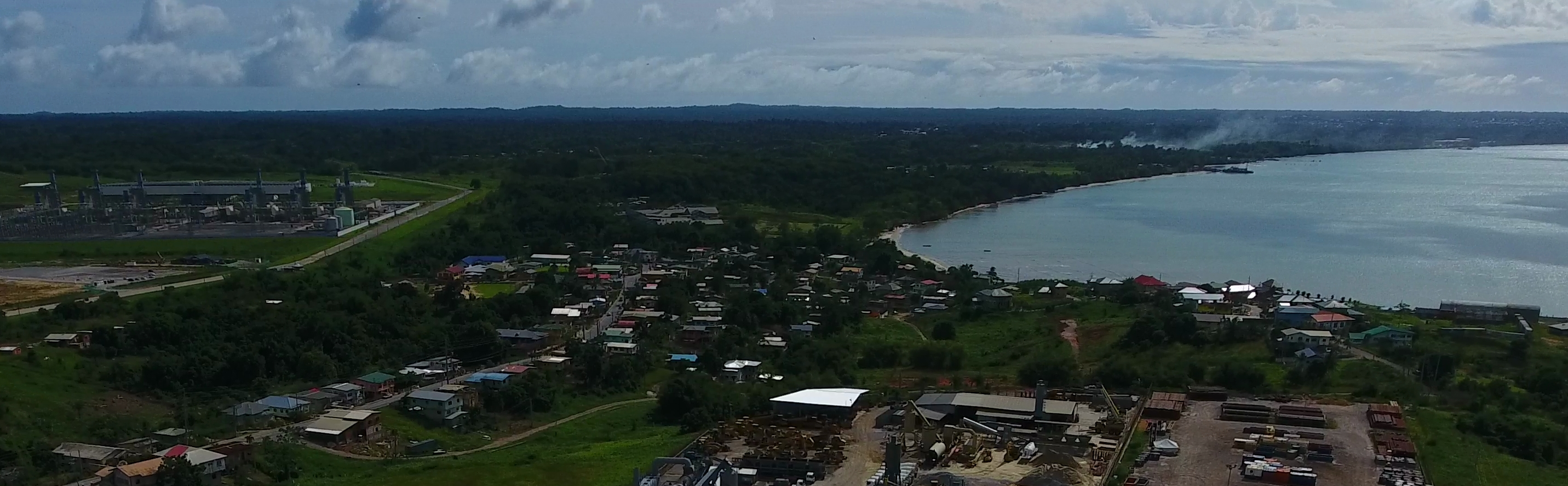
Vessigny

La Brea health district is situated in the mid-western peninsula. It is bounded by the Gulf of Paria on the west, Mondesir Road and part of National Mining on the north, by Fowl Play Bridge Aripero village on the south and by Union Village on the east. The villages included within these boundaries are: Union, Vessigny, Chinese Village, Aripero, Sobo, Rousillac village, Vance River and La Brea.

== Size and population ==
It is approximately 52 km^{2} (20 sq mi) in size and has a population of about 18,000.

== Climate ==
There are two main seasons: the dry season from January to May and the rainy season from May to December.

== Topography ==
La Brea is famous for its natural wonder of the world, "The Pitch Lake", which is actually the largest of three in existence. It is located on an area of depression in the landscape; with some pools, reeds and grayish asphalt everywhere. The asphalt is so soft in some areas that an individual can slowly sink if he/she stands on the surface too long. In some places one can put a stick through the asphalt and remove liquid tar. During the rainy season, the pools collect water, which becomes sulfurous due to the gases that are being released through the asphalt layers. These pools of water become breeding places for Aedes aegypti (yellow fever mosquito) and other mosquitoes, thereby creating a health risk for workers of Lake Asphalt Company and tourists as well as the local villagers.

== Transportation ==
Maxi taxis, P-cars, taxis and buses are available modes of transportation in the area.

== Industry and economy ==
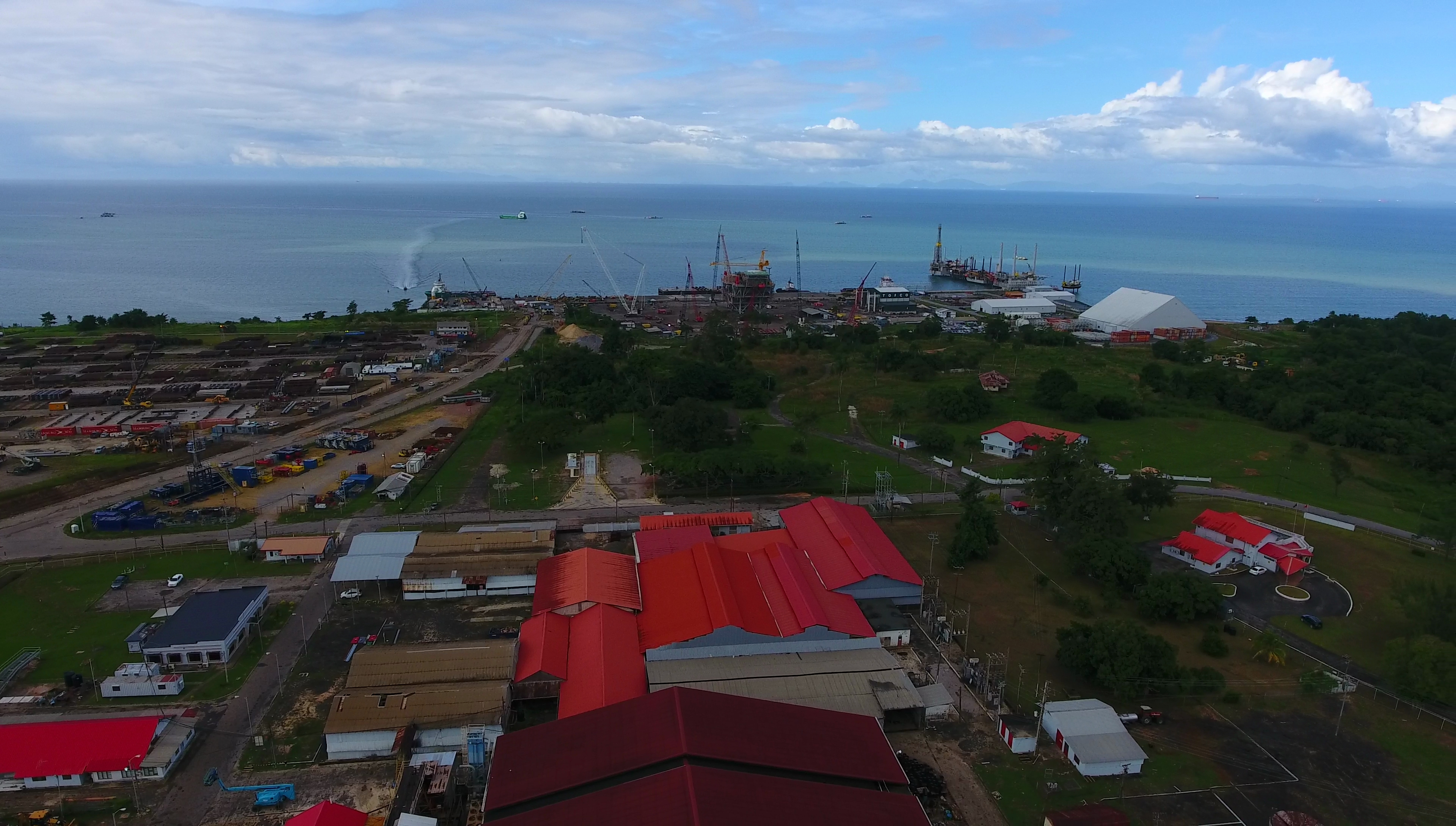
LABIDCO facilities and harbour

In La Brea the main and largest industry is the Lake Asphalt Company. Small-scale farming and fishing are other sources of income. However, many residents work outside the community either in the neighboring towns of Point Fortin and San Fernando or even further. Proposals for the construction of a smelter plant in the area have been the subject of protests due to the harmful effects such an industry may pose for residents.

Like much of southwestern Trinidad, La Brea has declined since the end of the oil boom in the early 1980s. The closure of the Trintoc (now Petrotrin) camp at Brighton was a major blow to the economy of the town. Attempts were made to lure heavy industry to the Labidco (La Brea Industrial Development Company) Industrial Estate in the early 1990s, but the geological instability of the area made the area unsuitable. More recent attempts to attract medium and light industry have been more successful.

In particular, the La Brea Industrial Estate, and its accompanying natural deep-water harbour at Brighton, were developed by NGC (National Gas Company)/NEC as an alternative industrial site to Point Lisas. At present, La Brea offers dock and deep draught harbour facilities, site and utilities for land-based industries, bioremediation and offshore logistical support.

== Local amenities ==
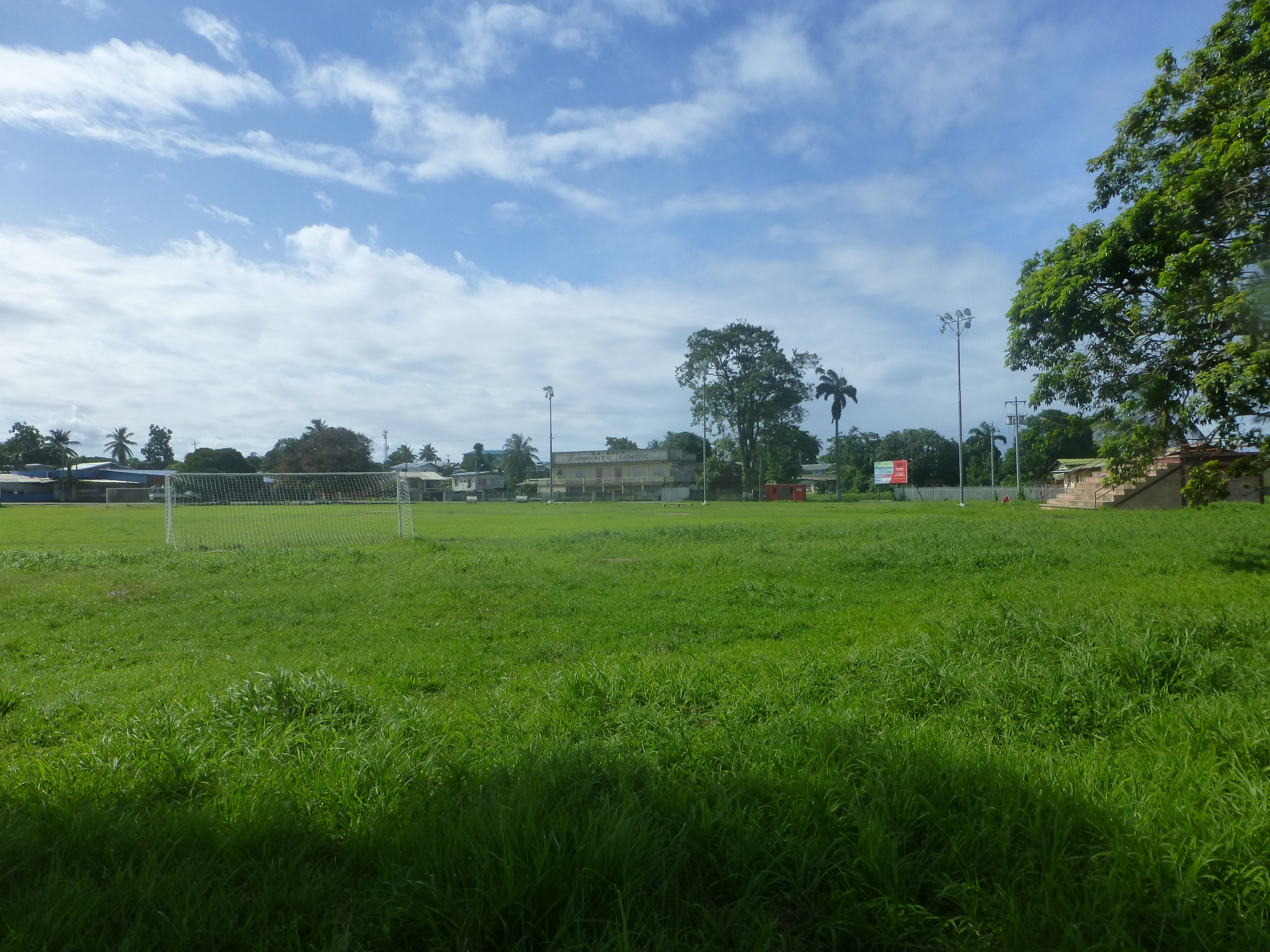
La Brea Brighton sports ground

The main recreational and relaxation facilities are Vessigny beach resort, "Carat shed" beach, Station beach, Pitch Lake Brighton sports ground and the sports ground located in Sobo

The only available health resources are Petrotrin Lake Asphalt Medical Centre, which is a private enterprise for health care of workers and their immediate family. The other health facility is the La Brea Health Centre, which serves the entire community.

La Brea is the location of the court house, revenue division, post office, market, abattoir, food court, drug store (in Rousillac), along with a few stores and an internet café.

== Government and politics ==
La Brea is part of the La Brea parliamentary constituency for elections to the Parliament of Trinidad and Tobago.
