= Tar pit =

Asphalt pit or asphalt lake

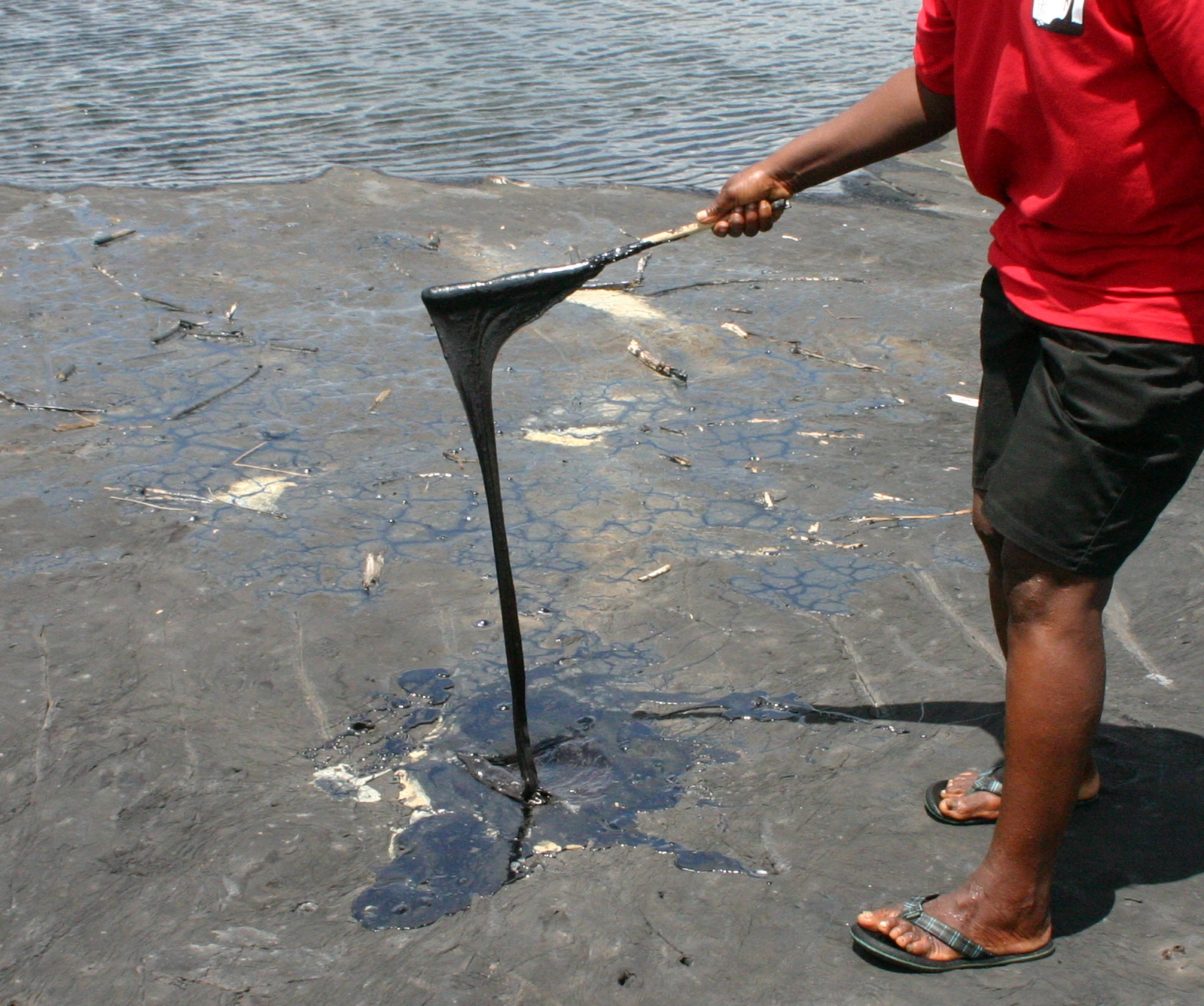
Tar pit at Tierra La Brea, Trinidad

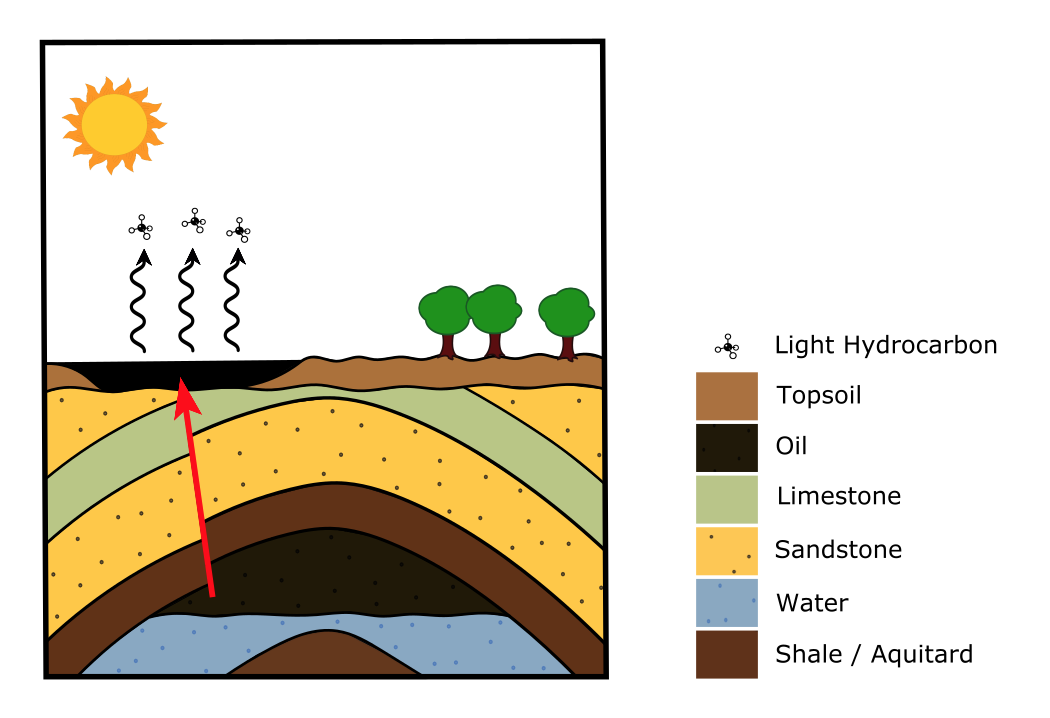
An anticlinal trap is feeding the tar pit on the surface through the vertical fracture in the strata (indicated by the red arrow). Once the crude oil reaches the surface, evaporation takes place and lighter hydrocarbons are vaporized, leaving behind sticky asphalt.

Tar pits, sometimes referred to as asphalt pits or tar seeps, are large asphalt deposits. They form in the presence of petroleum, which is created when decayed organic matter is subjected to pressure underground. If this crude oil seeps upward via fractures, conduits, or porous sedimentary rock layers, it may pool up at the surface. The lighter components of the crude oil evaporate into the atmosphere, leaving behind a black, sticky asphalt. Tar pits are often excavated because they contain large fossil collections.

Tar pits form above oil reserves, and these deposits are often found in anticlinal traps. In fact, about 80 percent of petroleum found on Earth has been found in anticlinal traps. Anticlines are folds in stratigraphic layers in which each half of the fold dips away from the crest. Such structures are usually developed above thrust faults or in tectonic regions where the land is bending and folding. If the structure above the concave-down fold (arch) is a non-porous rock or aquitard, such as shale, it is considered an anticlinal trap. If there is a fault or fracture in the overlying strata above the oil reserve, the oil may migrate to the surface. This is possible by capillary fringe and because oil is less dense than water.

== Chemistry ==
Tar pits are pools of asphalt. However, at the beginning of their formation, they are not necessarily sticky and dense. The pools were composed of crude oil that originated below Earth's surface. Crude oil is a mixture of heteroatom compounds, hydrocarbons, metals, and inorganic compounds. Heteroatom compounds are organic molecules that contain elements that are not carbon or hydrogen, while hydrocarbons contain only carbon and hydrogen. Crude oil is less viscous than asphalt because it contains a higher percentage of light hydrocarbons. Light hydrocarbons include the following alkanes: methane, ethane, propane, and butane. These molecules have very low molecular weights. Crude oils may also contain some inorganic impurities, such as CO_{2}, H_{2}S, N_{2}, and O_{2}. At the surface, these light molecules may evaporate out of the crude oil, leaving behind the heavier, stickier molecules. Asphalt, or bitumen, usually contains hydrocarbon molecule chains with 50+ carbon atoms. The longer the hydrocarbon chain, the more viscous it becomes, and the boiling point increases.

Evaporation is an important process in the formation of tar pits. A reservoir of light crude oil on Earth's surface can be reduced by up to 75% of the initial volume just after a few days, forming asphalt as the resulting product. For medium crude oils, the volume may be reduced by 40%. Crude oils will evaporate differently depending on their chemical composition. The average composition of a bitumen sample by weight is 80.2% carbon, 7.5% hydrogen, 7.6% oxygen, 1.7% nitrogen, and 3.0% sulfur.

== Notable tar pits ==
=== La Brea ===
The La Brea Tar Pits are located in Los Angeles. The petroleum that is seen on the surface is sourced from the Salt Lake Oil Field reservoir and the oil sands in the Repetto and Pico formations. These oil deposits were formed during the Miocene Epoch when marine plankton organisms accumulated in an ocean basin. Over time, sediments buried the organisms 300 to 1000 meters below Earth's surface, subjecting them to high pressures. This process turned the organic matter into oil. The 6th Street Fault that cuts through the Salt Lake Oil Field is the conduit that feeds the La Brea Tar Pits. Petroleum migrated to the surface over time, trapping and preserving animals and plants for the past 50,000 years.

=== Carpinteria ===
The Carpinteria Tar Pits are located in Tar Pits Park in Carpinteria, California. These tar pits were predicted to have formed during the Pleistocene. During an excavation project, 25 plant species were recovered along with 55 species of birds and 26 species of mammals. Springs of tar still ooze to the surface through fractures in the underlying stratigraphic layers of marine shale.

=== Binagadi asphalt lake ===
The Binagadi Asphalt Lake is located in Azerbaijan. This tar pit is known for preserving the heads and bodies of multiple cave lions, a mammal that flourished in the Pleistocene. A well-preserved horse skull was also found in the Binagadi asphalt lake. It is estimated to be 96–120 thousand years old. It is on display at the Natural-Historical Museum of Azerbaijan in Baku, Azerbaijan.

=== Pitch lake ===
The large, bowl-like depression filled with bitumen in Trinidad and Tobago. The lake has a maximum depth of 250 feet with an area of 100 acres, making it the largest deposit of solid bitumen on Earth. The lake is cold and dense near the shores, and it has a top layer that can be walked on. Underneath this skin, the asphalt is continuously churning. The lake gets gradually softer and hotter near the center where the bitumen begins to bubble. The gas being released in the middle of the lake is largely methane and an ample amount of carbon dioxide.

Pitch Lake formed thousands of years ago in the presence of tectonic activity. Movement along a fault created a fracture that tapped into an oil and gas reservoir deep within the crust. The oil and gas seeped upward to Earth's surface through the fracture over time, creating Pitch Lake. Due to this constant replenishment of the oil and gas, the lake has a slight current. The current is largely unnoticed because the top layer of Pitch Lake is mostly solid.

== Fossils ==
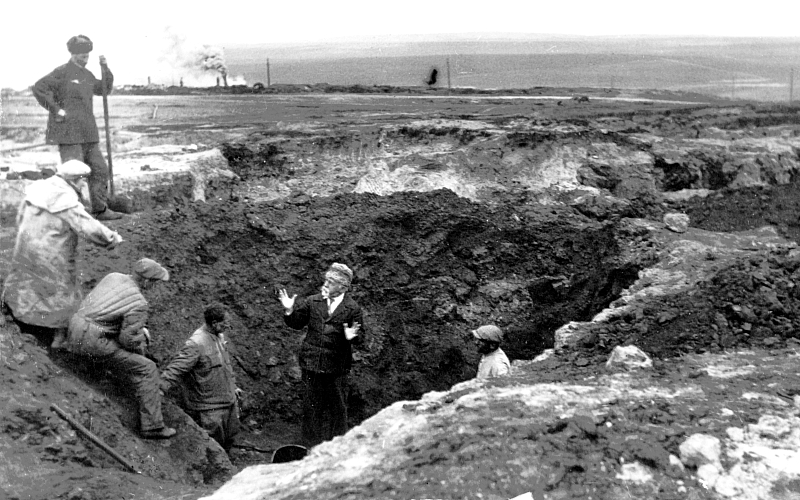
A 1938 paleontological excavation of the Binagadi asphalt lake

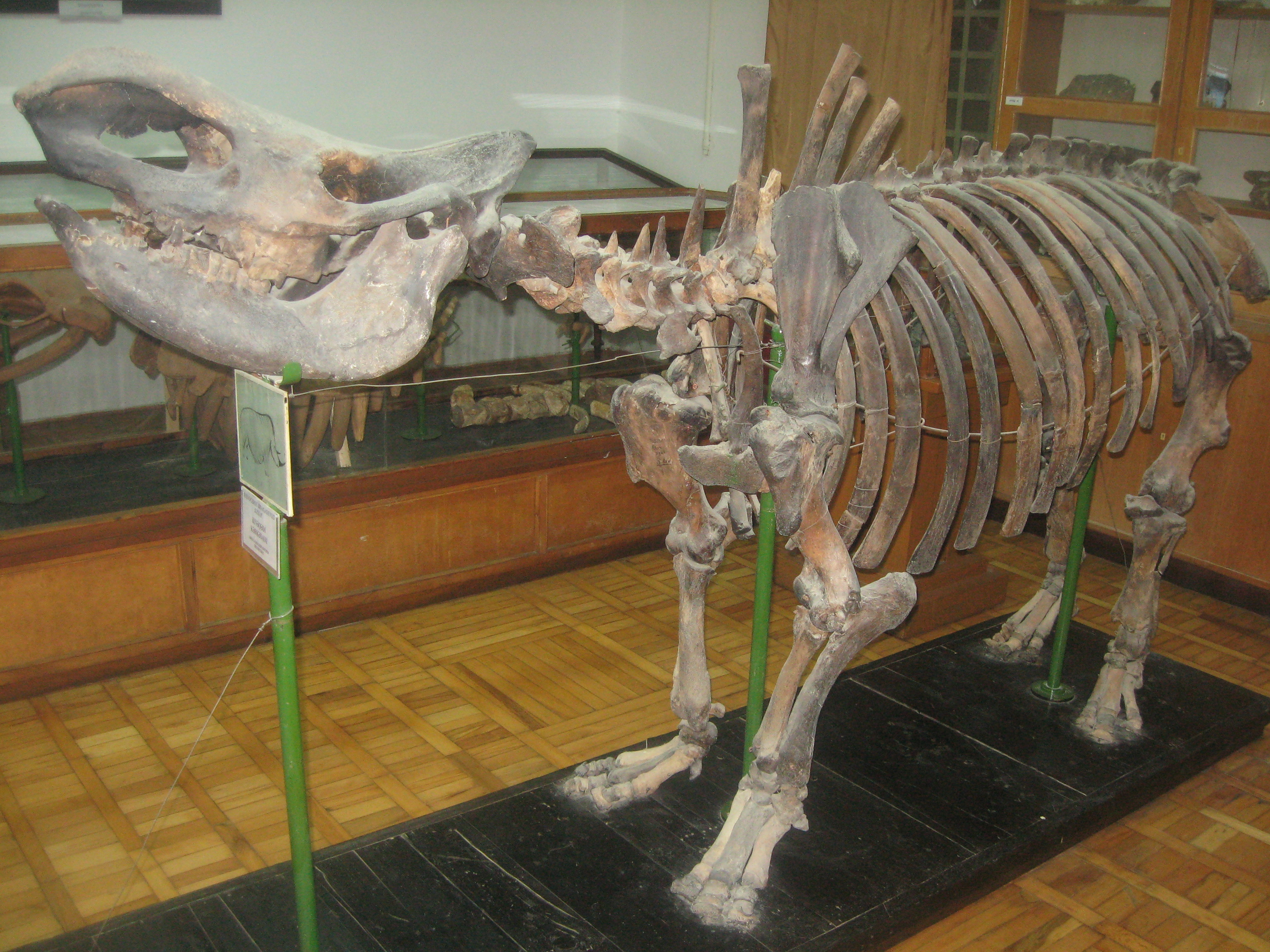
A Rhinoceros binagadensis skeleton, found in the Binagadi asphalt lake

Tar pits are characteristic of their many fossils. This is the case because the thick, sticky asphalt traps animals. Once animals step into the tar, they become immobilized and begin sinking immediately if the asphalt is warm and sticky enough. Predators that see these helpless animals usually would advance into the tar pits with the hope of catching their next meal. As a result, prey are usually found beneath the predator during excavation projects.

The bones and hard parts of the animals are well preserved because they are buried rapidly after the organism's death. Beneath the surface, the hard parts are engulfed with asphalt, and they are protected from climate variations like rain, wind, or snow that may accelerate weathering processes. Asphalt also lacks oxygen and water, so major decomposing organisms like aerobic fungi and bacteria are absent.

In the La Brea Tar Pits, more than one million bones have been recovered since 1906. 231 vertebrate species, 234 invertebrate species, and 159 plant species have been identified. The most frequent large mammal found in the La Brea Tar Pits is the dire wolf, one of the most famous prehistoric carnivores that lived during the Pleistocene. Fossils from saber-toothed cats and coyotes were also abundant. Additional fossils are constantly being discovered through continued excavation projects.

== Living organisms ==
Life was found in a ca. 28,000-year-old sample of natural asphalt in the La Brea Tar Pits. Hundreds of new species of bacteria were discovered that have the ability to thrive in environments with little to no water or air. They contain special enzymes that can break down hydrocarbons and other petroleum products. The origin of the bacteria in these natural asphalt pits is unknown, but it is believed that they evolved from preexisting soil microorganisms that survived an asphalt seepage event thousands of years ago. The soil microorganisms had to adapt and undergo genetic changes to help tolerate the harsh, new environment, which ultimately gave rise to new bacterial species.

In one study, the predominant bacteria found in the La Brea Tar Pits were of the Gammaproteobacteria class in the Chromatiales order, more simply referred to as purple sulfur bacteria. Purple sulfur bacteria do not use water as their reducing agent, so oxygen is not produced during respiration. Instead, they use sulfur in the form of sulfides as their reducing agent. Other bacteria discovered in the tar pits were of the Rubrobacteraceae family. These bacteria are known for being some of the most radiation-resistant organisms on the planet.

Pitch Lake, another asphalt pit in Trinidad and Tobago, is also a habitat for microbial communities of archaea and bacteria. Bacterial microorganisms from the orders Burkholderiales and Enterobacteriales have been found living in microliter-sized droplets of water recovered from the lake. The biomass in Pitch Lake lake was reported up to 10^{7} cells per gram of asphalt. Many of these microbes survive on sulfur, iron, methane, or other hydrocarbons. Ongoing research is being conducted in Pitch Lake because it mimics the environment found on the surface of Saturn’s largest moon, Titan. The discovery of extremophiles in Pitch Lake provides insight into the possibilities for microbial life in the hydrocarbon lakes that are found on Titan.

== Contributions to greenhouse gases ==
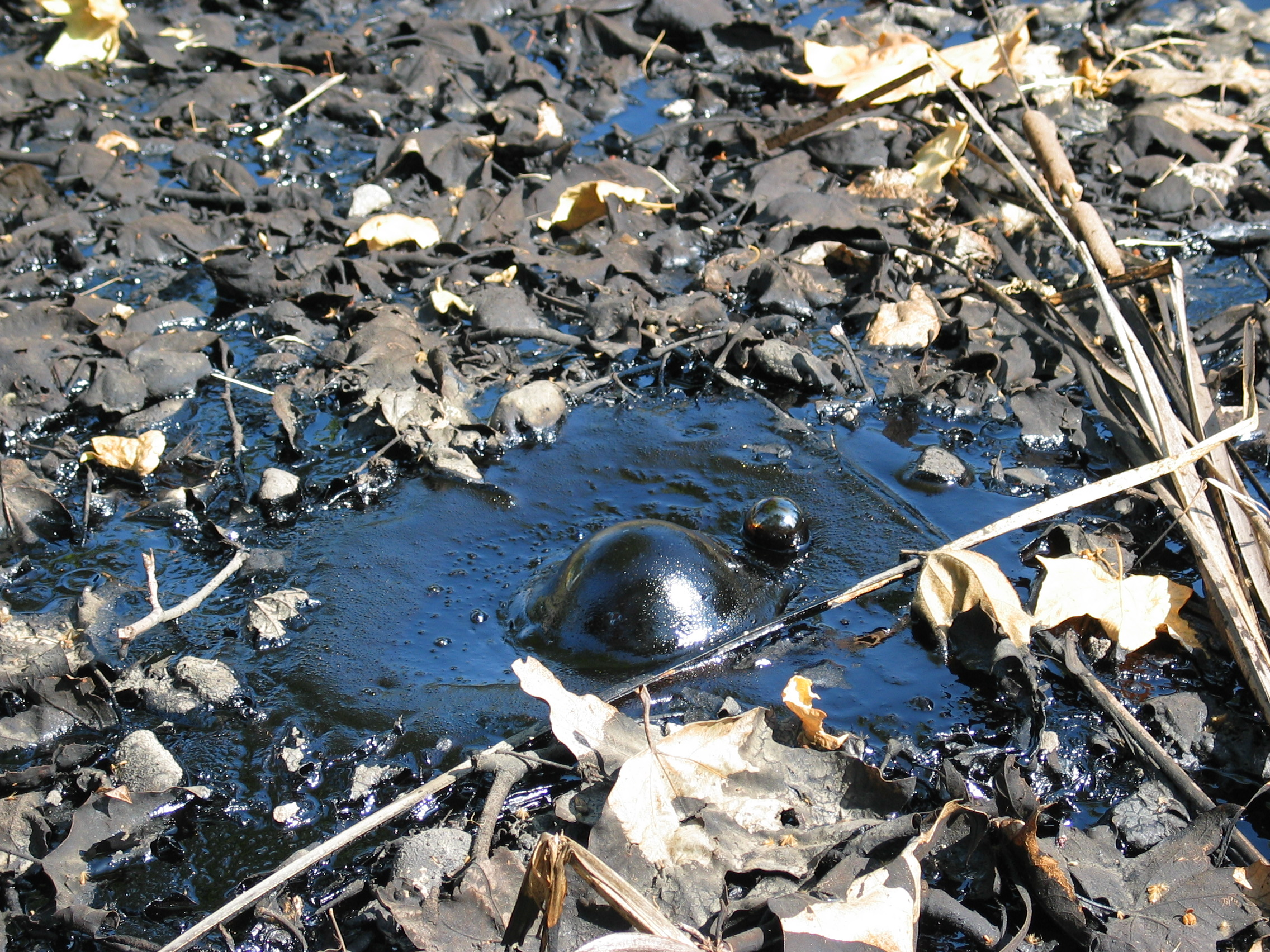
A tar pit releasing gas

Tar pits are formed by the fractionation of crude oil at the surface. The lighter hydrocarbons of the crude oil, which include methane (CH_{4}), ethane (C_{2}H_{6}), and propane (C_{3}H_{8}), evaporate, leaving behind larger hydrocarbons that make up the chemical composition of asphalt. This is a concern because methane, ethane, and propane are either major greenhouse gases and/or photochemical pollutants. The La Brea Tar Pits emit about 500 kg of methane per day. The emissions are the highest along the 6th Street Fault, which is the conduit that feeds the tar pits with crude oil from the sediments underneath Earth's surface. It was also discovered that methane is evaporating out of the nearby soil, affecting the physiology of the native grasses. The La Brea Tar Pits have the highest natural gas flux measured for any onshore seepage zone in the United States. On a global scale, geologic CH_{4} and C_{2}H_{6} emissions estimates from gas seepage in sedimentary rock are in the order of 50-70 Tg/year and 2-4 Tg/year respectively. These values are roughly half of the global CH_{4} and C_{2}H_{6} emissions from anthropogenic fossil fuel combustion, which are approximately 100-150 Tg CH_{4}/year and 6-8 Tg C_{2}H_{6}/year. These hydrocarbon emissions can be contributed to oil biodegradation and methanogenesis within the tar pits.

The natural geologic sources of methane and other hydrocarbons should be considered when modeling atmospheric greenhouse gases. Not all sources of hydrocarbons in the atmosphere are a result of anthropogenic emissions.

== Dangers of tar pits ==
Hydrocarbon seepage in urban or industrialized areas present a geologic hazard due to the explosive nature of hydrocarbons. On March 24, 1985, a pocket of methane gas passed through a small opening between the floor slab and foundation walls of a Ross clothing department store in Los Angeles, only about a mile north of the La Brea Tar Pits. This methane pocket created an explosion that injured 21 people. This event increased awareness of the potential dangers of methane pockets and hydrocarbon seepage in the area.

== Key to paleoplant behavior ==
Tar pits are excellent preserving agents, and they also have the ability to provide carbon isotope data for trees that have fallen into the asphalt. Looking at carbon isotope data in prehistoric trees can reveal information about plant responses to different amounts of carbon dioxide in the paleoatmosphere. Samples of Juniperus trees from the Last Glacial Period were recovered from the La Brea Tar Pits, and they revealed that the ratio of intercellular and atmospheric CO_{2} was similar between glacial and modern trees. Since the amount of carbon dioxide during the Last Glacial Period was between 180 and 200 ppm (409.8 ppm today), there was less carbon available for photosynthesis. The Juniperus trees had to enhance CO_{2} uptake to survive under limiting carbon conditions. It is likely that the trees’ stomatal conductance and chloroplast demand for CO_{2} was higher during this period to increase their carbon consumption. When moving into the following Interglacial Period, the Juniperus trees’ stomatal conductance and chloroplast demand for CO_{2} decreased as a result of higher temperatures and higher CO_{2} concentrations in the atmosphere. This response to fluctuating carbon levels is seen in plants over time. For example, increased stomatal conductance is observed in modern C3 plants grown in low CO_{2} environments. It is also hypothesized that the wetter climate during the Last Glacial Period may have increased the nitrogen availability to plants, which therefore increased the concentration of nitrogen in leaves. This change may have increased the Juniperus trees’ photosynthetic capacities.

== History of tar pits and humans ==
The body of a Pre-Columbian era woman, La Brea Woman, was recovered from the La Brea Tar Pits in 1914. Only the skull and parts of the skeleton were preserved, and she was determined to have died about 9,000 years ago. She was between the ages 18–24 at death, and she was 4 feet and 8-10 inches tall. This is the only reported instance of human remains found within tar pits.

For thousands of years, Native Americans used tar from the La Brea Tar Pits as an adhesive and binding agent. They would use it as waterproof caulking to line their boats and baskets. When Europeans arrived at the tar pits, they began mining and extracting the tar for roofing material in nearby towns.
