= History of the petroleum industry =

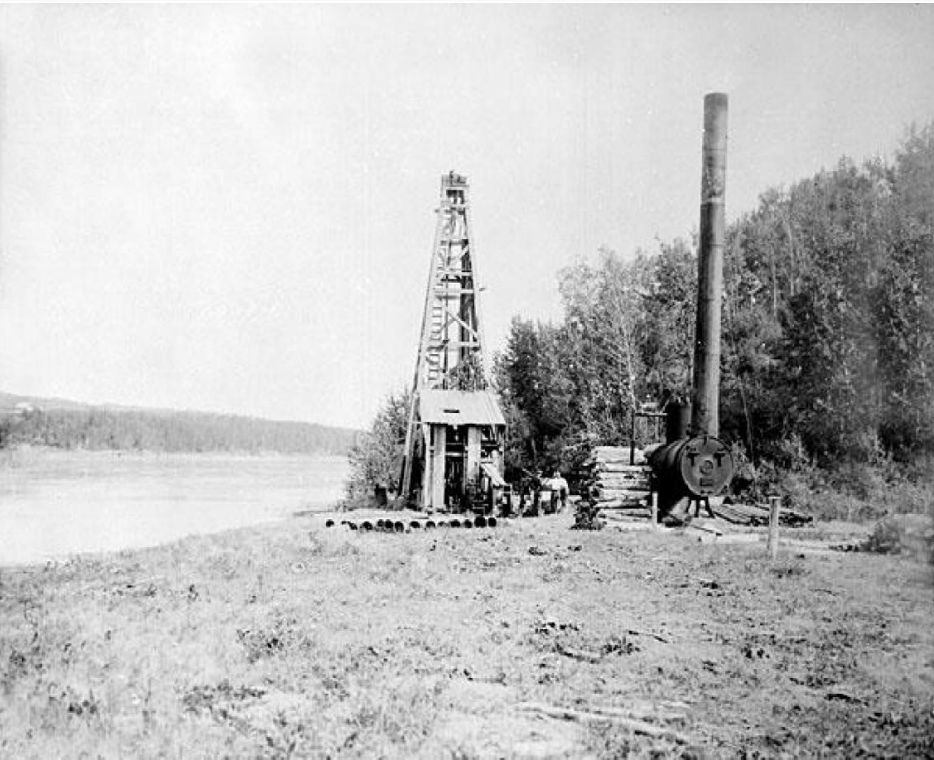
Early oil drilling infrastructure. Picture from the Athabasca River, Alberta, Canada in 1898.

The modern petroleum industry along with its outputs and applications started in the 1800s, although the local use of oil goes back many centuries. Petroleum's status as a key component of politics, society, and technology has its roots in the coal and kerosene industry of the late nineteenth century. One of the earliest instances of this is the refining of paraffin from crude oil. Abraham Gesner developed a process to refine a liquid fuel (which he would later call kerosene) from coal, bitumen and oil shale; it burned more cleanly and was cheaper than whale oil. James Young in 1847 noticed a natural petroleum seepage when he distilled a light thin oil suitable for use as lamp oil, at the same time obtaining a thicker oil suitable for lubricating machinery. The world's first refineries and modern oil wells were established in the mid-nineteenth century. While petroleum industries developed in several countries during the nineteenth century, the two giants were the United States and the Russian Empire, specifically that part of it that today forms the territory of independent Azerbaijan. Together, these two countries produced 97% of the world's oil over the course of the nineteenth century.

Over the 20th century, oil became a resource of increasing strategic importance. When oil-fired turbines replaced steam engines in warships, control of oil supplies became a factor in military strategy—and played a key role in World War II. The use of the internal combustion engine for automobiles and trucks in the turn of the twentieth century was a critical factor in the explosive growth of the industry in the United States, Europe, Middle East and later the rest of the world. After the dominance of coal waned in the mid-1950s, oil received significant media coverage and its importance on modern economies increased greatly, being a major factor in several energy crises.

The concern of oil reserve depletion has brought new developments to light such as commercial-scale fracking and the increasing usage of cleaner energy. In the twentieth century issues of air pollution led to government regulation. In the early twenty-first century, environmental issues regarding global warming from oil and gas (in addition to coal) makes the industry politically controversial.

== Early history ==
According to Herodotus, more than four thousand years ago natural asphalt was employed in the construction of the walls and towers of Babylon. Great quantities of it were found on the banks of the river Issus, one of the tributaries of the Euphrates. This fact was confirmed by Diodorus Siculus. Herodotus mentioned pitch spring on Zacynthus (Ionian islands, Greece). Also, Herodotus described a well for bitumen (very thick oil) and oil near Ardericca in Cessia.

In China, petroleum was used more than 2000 years ago. In I Ching, one of the earliest Chinese writings cites the use of oil in its raw state without refining was first discovered, extracted, and used in China in the first century BC. In addition, the Chinese were the first to use petroleum as fuel as early as the fourth century BC.

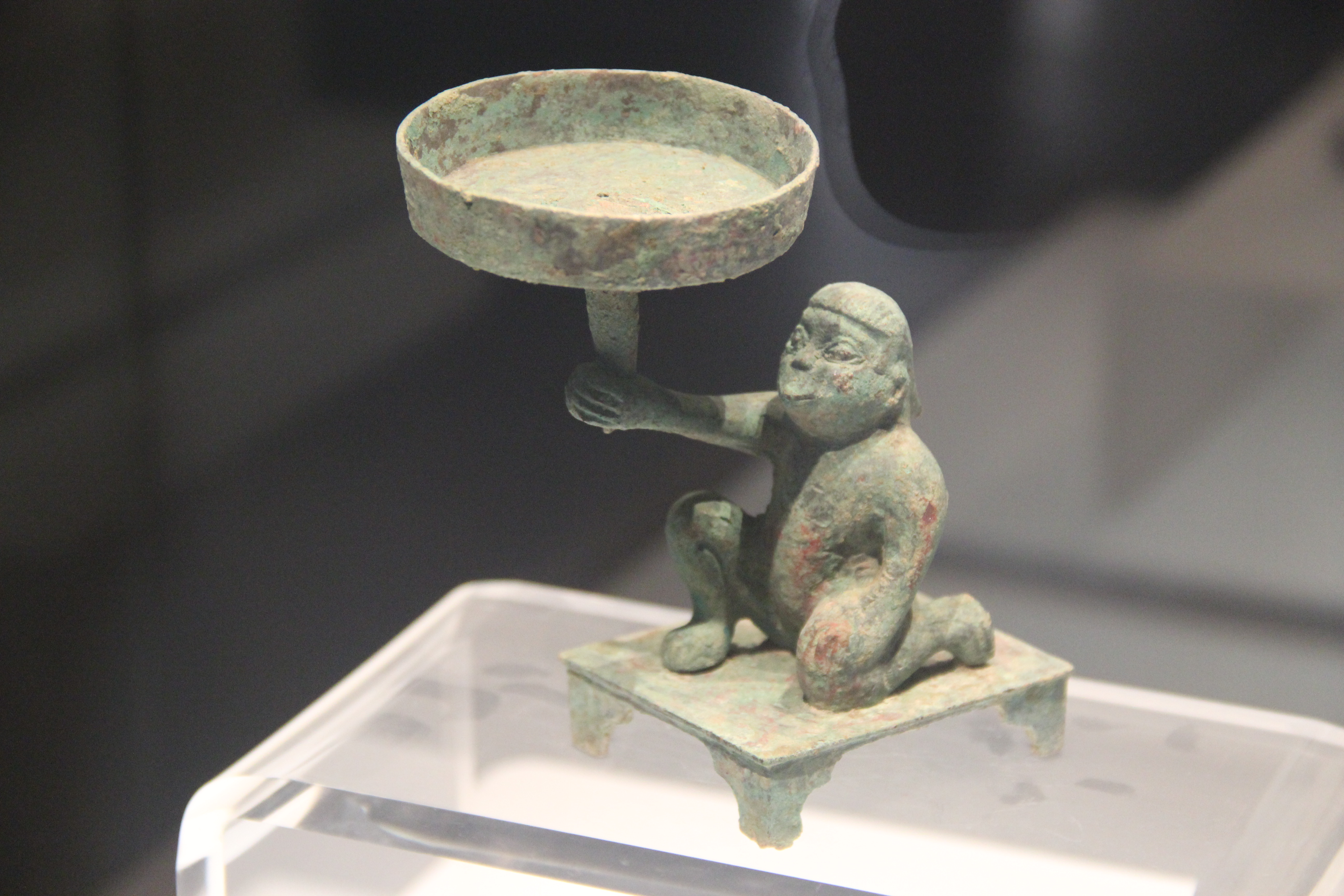
Han dynasty period bronze oil lamp in Luoyang Museum, Henan, China

The earliest known gas wells were drilled in China in AD 347 or earlier. They had depths of up to about 800 feet (240 m) and were drilled using bits attached to bamboo poles. The gas was burned to evaporate brine and produce salt. By the tenth century, extensive bamboo pipelines connected gas wells with salt springs. The ancient records of China and Japan are said to contain many allusions to the use of natural gas for lighting and heating. Petroleum was known as burning water in Japan in the seventh century. In his book Dream Pool Essays written in 1088, the scientist and statesman Shen Kuo of the Song dynasty coined the word 石油 (Shíyóu, literally "rock oil") for petroleum, which remains the term used in contemporary Chinese and Japanese (Sekiyu).

The first streets of Baghdad were paved with tar, derived from petroleum that became accessible from natural fields in the region. In the ninth century, oil fields were exploited in the area around modern Baku, Azerbaijan. These fields were described by the Arab geographer Abu al-Hasan 'Alī al-Mas'ūdī in the tenth century, and by Marco Polo in the thirteenth century, who described the output of those wells as hundreds of shiploads. Through Islamic Spain, distillation became available in Western Europe by the twelfth century. It has also been present in Romania since the thirteenth century, being recorded as păcură.

Originally, various forms of the terms "Naphta", "Asphalt" and "Bitumen" were used for the liquid and solid forms of Petroleum. The origin of the term "Petroleum" stems from monasteries in southern Italy where it was in use by the end of the first millennium as an alternative for the older term "naphta". For the volatile forms of hydrocarbons, now known as "Methane" or "Natural Gas", terms came only in use during the seventeenth century and later.

The earliest mention of petroleum in the Americas occurs in Sir Walter Raleigh's account of the Trinidad Pitch Lake in 1595; while thirty-seven years later, the account of a visit of a Franciscan, Joseph de la Roche d'Allion, to the oil springs of New York was published in Gabriel Sagard's Histoire du Canada. A Finnish born Swede, scientist and student of Carl Linnaeus, Peter Kalm, in his work Travels into North America published first in 1753 showed on a map the oil springs of Pennsylvania.

In 1710 or 1711 (sources vary) the Russian-born Swiss physician and Greek teacher Eirini d'Eyrinys (or Eirini d'Eirinis) discovered asphaltum at Val-de-Travers, Neuchâtel. He established a bitumen mine (de la Presta) there in 1719 that operated until 1986.

In 1745 under the Empress Elizabeth of Russia the first oil well and refinery were built in Ukhta by Fiodor Priadunov. Through the process of distillation of the "rock oil" (petroleum) he received a kerosene-like substance, which was used in oil lamps by Russian churches and monasteries (though households still relied on candles).

Oil sands were mined from 1745 in Merkwiller-Pechelbronn, Alsace under the direction of Louis Pierre Ancillon de la Sablonnière, by special appointment of Louis XV. The Pechelbronn oil field was active until 1970, and was the birthplace of companies like Antar and Schlumberger. The first modern refinery was built there in 1857.

== Modern history ==
=== Coal oil ===
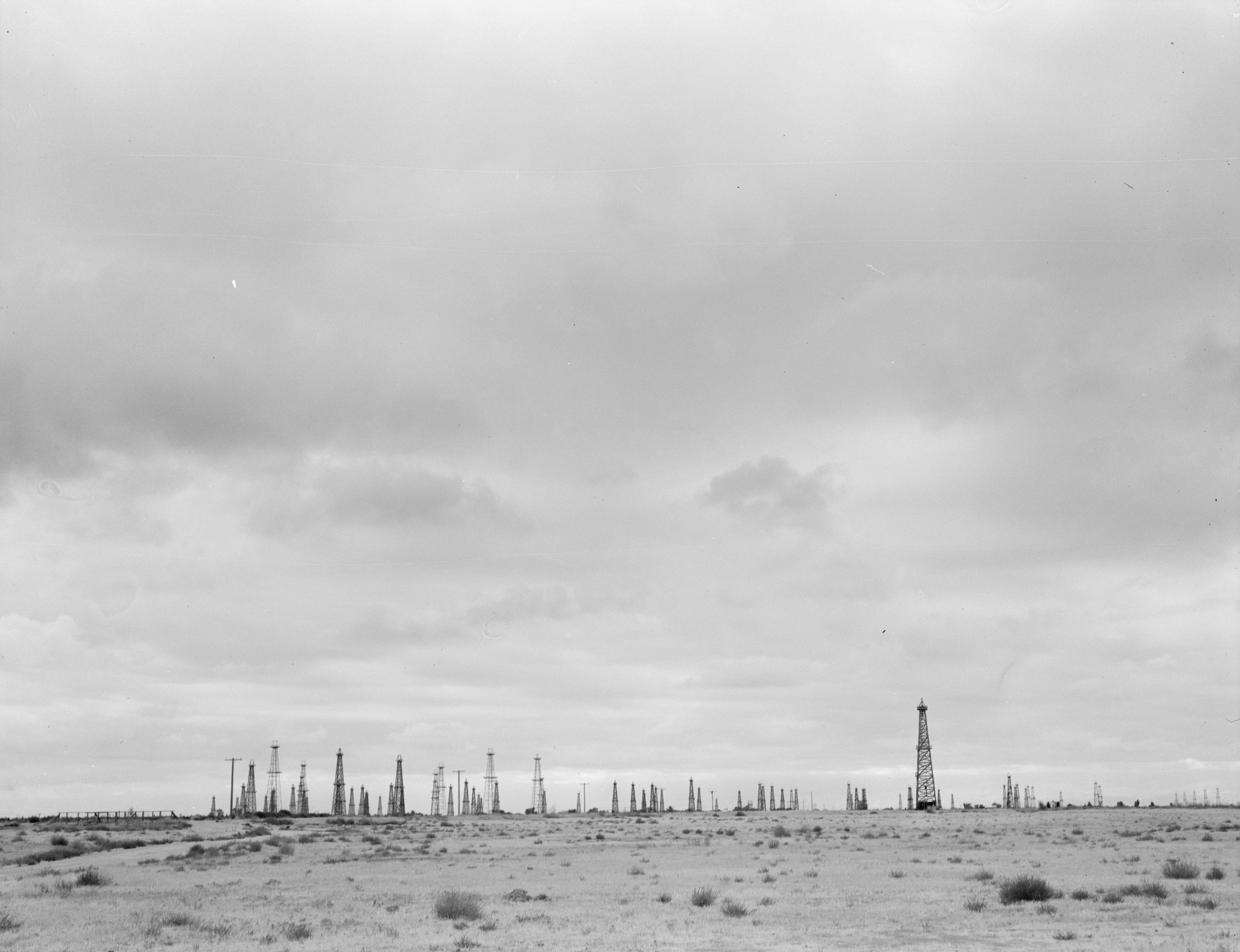
Oil field in California, 1938.

The modern history of petroleum began in the nineteenth century with the refining of paraffin from crude oil. The Scottish chemist James Young in 1847 noticed a natural petroleum seepage in the Riddings colliery at Alfreton, Derbyshire from which he distilled a light thin oil suitable for use as lamp oil, at the same time obtaining a thicker oil suitable for lubricating machinery.

The new oils were successful, but the supply of oil from the coal mine soon began to fail (eventually being exhausted in 1851). Young, noticing that the oil was dripping from the sandstone roof of the coal mine, theorized that it somehow originated from the action of heat on the coal seam and from this thought that it might be produced artificially.

Following up this idea, he tried many experiments and eventually succeeded, by distilling cannel coal at a low heat, a fluid resembling petroleum, which when treated in the same way as the seep oil gave similar products. Young found that by slow distillation he could obtain a number of useful liquids from it, one of which he named "paraffine oil" because at low temperatures it congealed into a substance resembling paraffin wax.

The production of these oils and solid paraffin wax from coal formed the subject of his patent dated 17 October 1850. In 1850 Young & Meldrum and Edward William Binney entered into partnership under the title of E.W. Binney & Co. at Bathgate in West Lothian and E. Meldrum & Co. at Glasgow; their works at Bathgate were completed in 1851 and became the first truly commercial oil-works and oil refinery in the world, using oil extracted from locally mined torbanite, shale, and bituminous coal to manufacture naphtha and lubricating oils; paraffin for fuel use and solid paraffin were not sold till 1856.

=== Kerosene ===
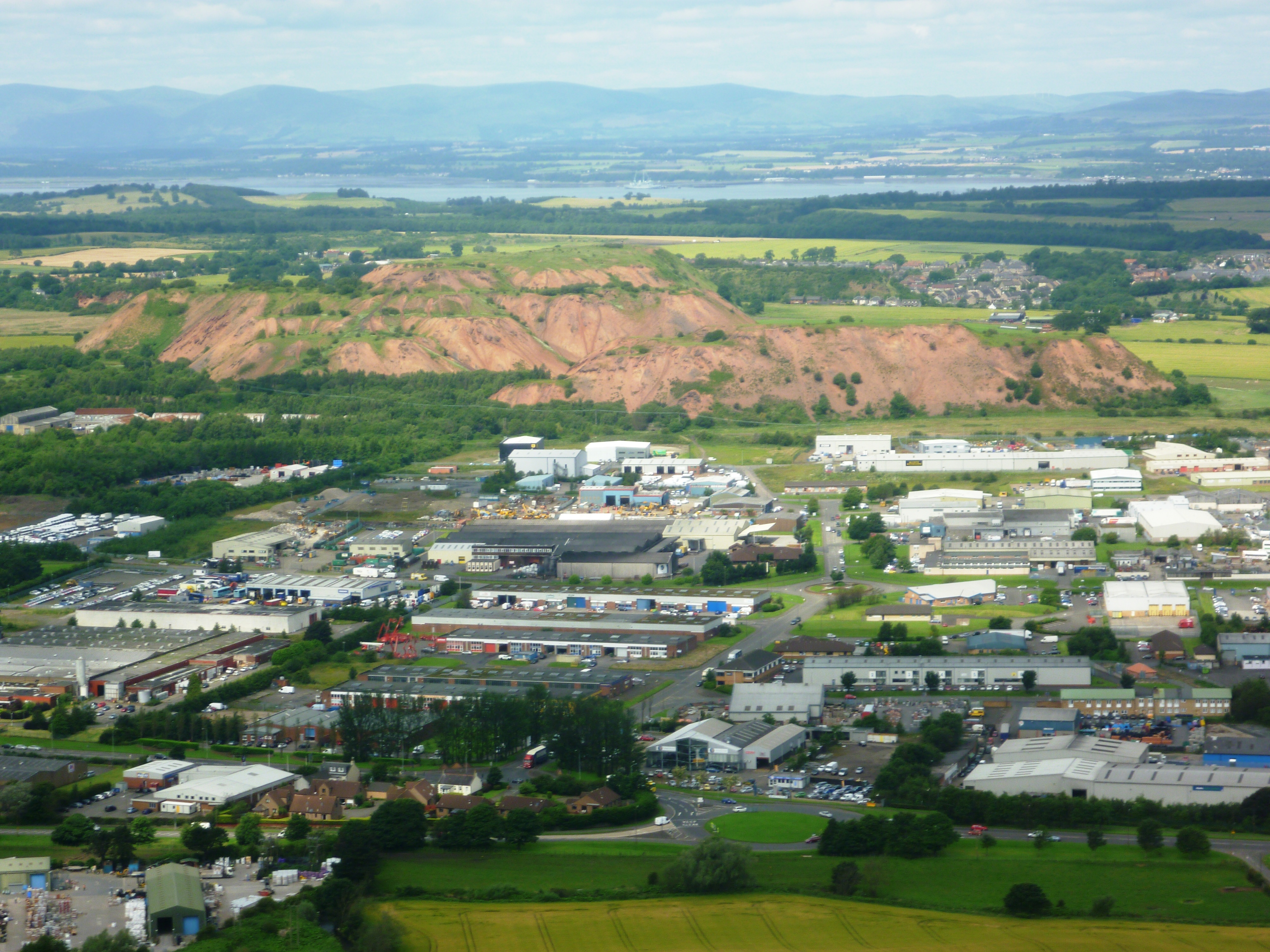
Shale bings near Broxburn, 3 of a total of 19 in West Lothian.

Abraham Pineo Gesner, a Canadian geologist developed a process to refine a liquid fuel from coal, bitumen and oil shale. His new discovery, which he named kerosene, burned more cleanly and was less expensive than competing products, such as whale oil. In 1850, Gesner created the Kerosene Gaslight Company and began installing lighting in the streets in Halifax and other cities. By 1854, he had expanded to the United States where he created the North American Kerosene Gas Light Company at Long Island, New York. Demand grew to where his company's capacity to produce became a problem, but the discovery of petroleum, from which kerosene could be more easily produced, solved the supply problem.

Ignacy Łukasiewicz improved Gesner's method to develop a means of refining kerosene from the more readily available "rock oil" ("petr-oleum") seeps, in 1852, and the first rock oil mine was built in Bóbrka, near Krosno in central European Galicia (Poland) in 1854. These discoveries rapidly spread around the world, and Meerzoeff built the first modern Russian refinery in the mature oil fields at Baku in 1861. At that time Baku produced about 90% of the world's oil.

=== Oil wells ===
What constitutes the first commercial oil well is not entirely clear and there is no general consensus. The following summary draws from that in Vassiliou (2018). Edwin Drake's 1859 well near Titusville, Pennsylvania is popularly considered the first modern well. Drake's well is probably singled out because it was drilled, not dug; because it used a steam engine; because there was a company associated with it; and because it touched off a major boom.

Additionally, there was considerable activity before Drake in various parts of the world in the mid-nineteenth century. In 1846, another candidate for consideration as the first modern oil well in the world was drilled in the South Caucasus region of the Russian Empire, (Azerbaijan now) on the Absheron Peninsula north-east of Baku (in the settlement Bibi-Eibat), by Russian Major Nikoly Matveevich Alekseev based on the ideas and vision of Nikoly Ivanovich Voskoboinikov. Unlike Drake's well, though, the 1846 Baku well was drilled using human and animal power, not an engine. There were engine-drilled wells in West Virginia in the same year as Drake's well. An early commercial well was hand dug in Poland in 1853, and another in nearby Romania in 1857. Also, a well was drilled in 1857 to a depth of 280 ft by the American Merrimac Company in La Brea (Spanish for “Pitch”) in southeast Trinidad in the Caribbean.

=== Refineries ===
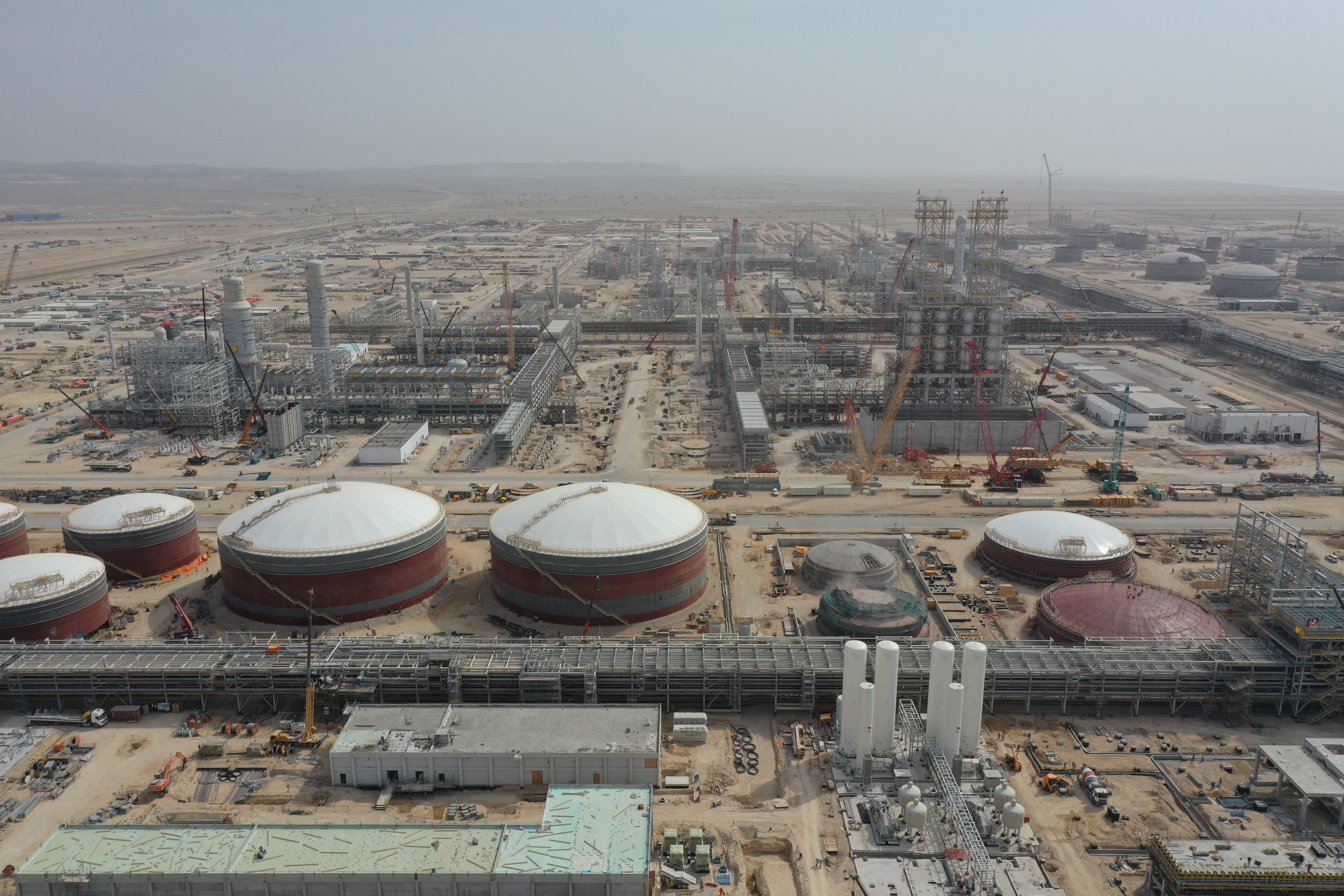
Duqm refinery south of Muscat, Oman

Distillation of oil started halfway through the eighteenth century in small refineries (called "distillaries") in the Ural, Galicia (now NW Ukraine), and in the Russian district of Mozdoksky (near modern-day Grozny city), where the first oil refinaries (primitive brick-outlined distilleries with a pot) were built and run by Dubinin brothers in 1823, serfs who prior to that had experience in resin distillation used to make pine tar.

During the first half of the nineteenth century small refineries were opened in Moravia (now Czechia), Galicia, France, and Poland. The first larger scale oil refineries were opened at Jasło, in Poland, with the largest one being opened at Ploiești, in Romania. Built in 1856 and inaugurated in 1857 by the brothers Teodor and Marin Mehedinţeanu, the Rafov Refinery, the refinery built at Ploiesti, had a surface area of four hectares. There, the daily production reached over seven tons, obtained in cylindrical iron and iron casts that were heated by fire from wood. It was then called "the world's first systematic oil distillery," setting the record for being the world's first oil refinery, according to the Academy Of World Records.

This refinery obtained, on the basis of a contract concluded in October 1856 between Teodor Mehedinţeanu and the City Hall of Bucharest, the exclusive right to supply the illumination of the Wallachian capital with oil lamp. The contract began to be executed on April 1, 1857, when, by replacing the kidnapped oil with the products supplied by the Rafov refinery, "Bucharest became the first city in the world illuminated entirely with distilled crude oil."

In 1857, the total production of Romania was amounted to 275 tons of crude oil. With this figure, Romania was registered as the first country in world oil production statistics, before other large oil producing states such as the United States of America (1860), Russia (1863), Mexico (1901) or Persia (1913).

=== United States ===
Early crude production in the U.S.
Year	Volume
1859	2,000 barrels (~270 t)
1869	4,215,000 barrels (~5.750×10^{5} t)
1879	19,914,146 barrels (~2.717×10^{6} t)
1889	35,163,513 barrels (~4.797×10^{6} t)
1899	57,084,428 barrels (~7.788×10^{6} t)
1906	126,493,936 barrels (~1.726×10^{7} t)

In 1875, crude oil was discovered by David Beaty at his home in Warren, Pennsylvania. This led to the opening of the Bradford oil field, which, by the 1880s, produced 77 percent of the global oil supply. However, by the end of the nineteenth century, the Russian Empire, particularly the Branobel company in Azerbaijan, had taken the lead in production.

Samuel Kier established America's first oil refinery in Pittsburgh on Seventh avenue near Grant Street, in 1853. In addition to the activity in West Virginia and Pennsylvania, an important early oil well in North America was in Oil Springs, Ontario, Canada in 1858, dug by James Miller Williams. The discovery at Oil Springs touched off an oil boom which brought hundreds of speculators and workers to the area. New oil fields were discovered nearby throughout the late nineteenth century and the area developed into a large petrochemical refining centre and exchange. The modern U.S. petroleum industry is considered to have begun with Edwin Drake's drilling of a 69-foot (21 m) oil well in 1859, on Oil Creek near Titusville, Pennsylvania, for the Seneca Oil Company (originally yielding 25 barrels per day (4.0 m^{3}/d), by the end of the year output was at the rate of 15 barrels per day (2.4 m^{3}/d)). The industry grew through the 1800s, driven by the demand for kerosene and oil lamps. It became a major national concern in the early part of the twentieth century; the introduction of the internal combustion engine provided a demand that has largely sustained the industry to this day. Early "local" finds like those in Pennsylvania and Ontario were quickly outpaced by demand, leading to "oil booms" in Ohio, Texas, Oklahoma, and California.

=== 20th century ===
Galician oilfields made Austria-Hungary the world's third largest oil producing country after United States and the Russian Empire, with a 5 percent share of the global oil production in 1908. By 1910, significant oil fields had been discovered in the Dutch East Indies (1885, in Sumatra), Persia (1908, in Masjed Soleiman), Peru (1863, in Zorritos District), Venezuela (1914, in Maracaibo Basin), and Mexico, and were being developed at an industrial level. Austria-Hungary lost its primate on oil production which had been at the root of the 1910 Petroleum War. Significant oil fields were exploited in Alberta (Canada) from 1947. Offshore oil drilling at Oil Rocks (Neft Dashlari) in the Caspian Sea off Azerbaijan eventually resulted in a city built on pylons in 1949.

The availability of oil and access to it, became of "cardinal importance" in military power before and after World War I, particularly for navies as they changed from coal, but also with the introduction of motor transport, tanks and airplanes. Such thinking would continue in later conflicts of the twentieth century, including World War II, during which oil facilities were a major strategic asset and were extensively bombed. In 1938, vast reserves of oil were discovered in the al-Ahsa region in the Eastern Part of the Kingdom of Saudi Arabia along the coast of the Arabian Gulf.

Until the mid-1950s coal was still the world's foremost fuel, but after this time oil quickly took over. Later, following the 1973 and 1979 energy crises, there was significant media coverage on the subject of oil supply levels. This brought to light the concern that oil is a limited resource that will eventually run out, at least as an economically viable energy source. Although at the time the most common and popular predictions were quite dire, a period of increased production and reduced demand in the following years caused an oil glut in the 1980s. This was not to last, however, and by the first decade of the twenty-first century discussions about peak oil had returned to the news.

Today, about 90% of vehicular fuel needs are met by oil. Petroleum also makes up 40% of total energy consumption in the United States, but is responsible for only 2% of electricity generation. Petroleum serves as a portable, dense energy source powering the vast majority of vehicles and is the base of many industrial chemicals.

As of 2010s, massive hydraulic fracturing are being applied on a commercial scale to shales in the United States, Canada, China and others.

The top three oil producing countries are the United States, Russia, and Saudi Arabia in 2023. However, figures from 2021 shows that the United States has surpassed (18.8 million barrel per day) both Russia (10.8) and Saudi Arabia (10.8) by a wide margin. About 80% of the world's readily accessible reserves are located in the Middle East, with 62.5% coming from the Arab 5: Saudi Arabia (12.5%), UAE, Iraq, Qatar and Kuwait. However, with high oil prices (above $100/barrel), Venezuela has larger reserves than Saudi Arabia due to its crude reserves derived from bitumen.

== See also ==
=== History of the petroleum industry ===
- Petroleum
- 1967 Oil Embargo
- 1973 oil crisis
- 1979 oil crisis
- 1980s oil glut
- 1990 oil price shock
- 2000s energy crisis
- 2010s oil glut
- 2020 oil price war

=== Geography ===
- List of countries by oil extraction
- Oil and gas industry in India
- Petroleum industry in Iran
- Petroleum industry in Russia
- History of the oil industry in Saudi Arabia
- Oil and gas industry in the United Kingdom
  - Petroleum refining in the United Kingdom
- History of the petroleum industry in the United States
  - Petroleum in the United States
  - Pennsylvania oil rush
  - Texas oil boom
- History of the Venezuelan oil industry

=== Businesses ===
- Petroleum industry
- Seven Sisters (oil companies)
  - Anglo-Iranian Oil Company (originally Anglo-Persian; now BP)
  - Royal Dutch Shell
  - Standard Oil Company of California (SoCal, later Chevron)
  - Gulf Oil (now merged into Chevron)
  - Texaco (now merged into Chevron)
  - Standard Oil Company of New Jersey (Esso, later Exxon, now part of ExxonMobil)
  - Standard Oil Company of New York (Socony, later Mobil, now part of ExxonMobil)
