= Petroleum seep =

Place where natural hydrocarbons escape

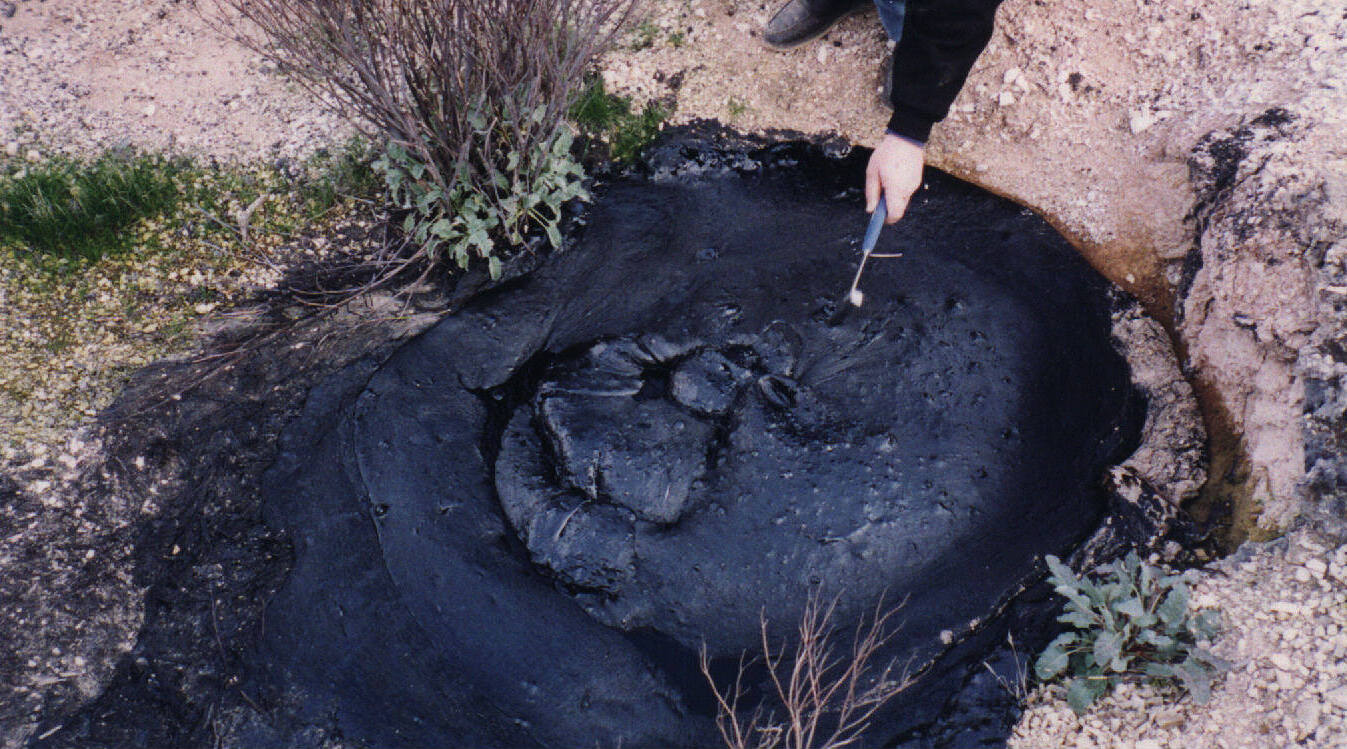
Naturally occurring oil seep near McKittrick, California, United States.

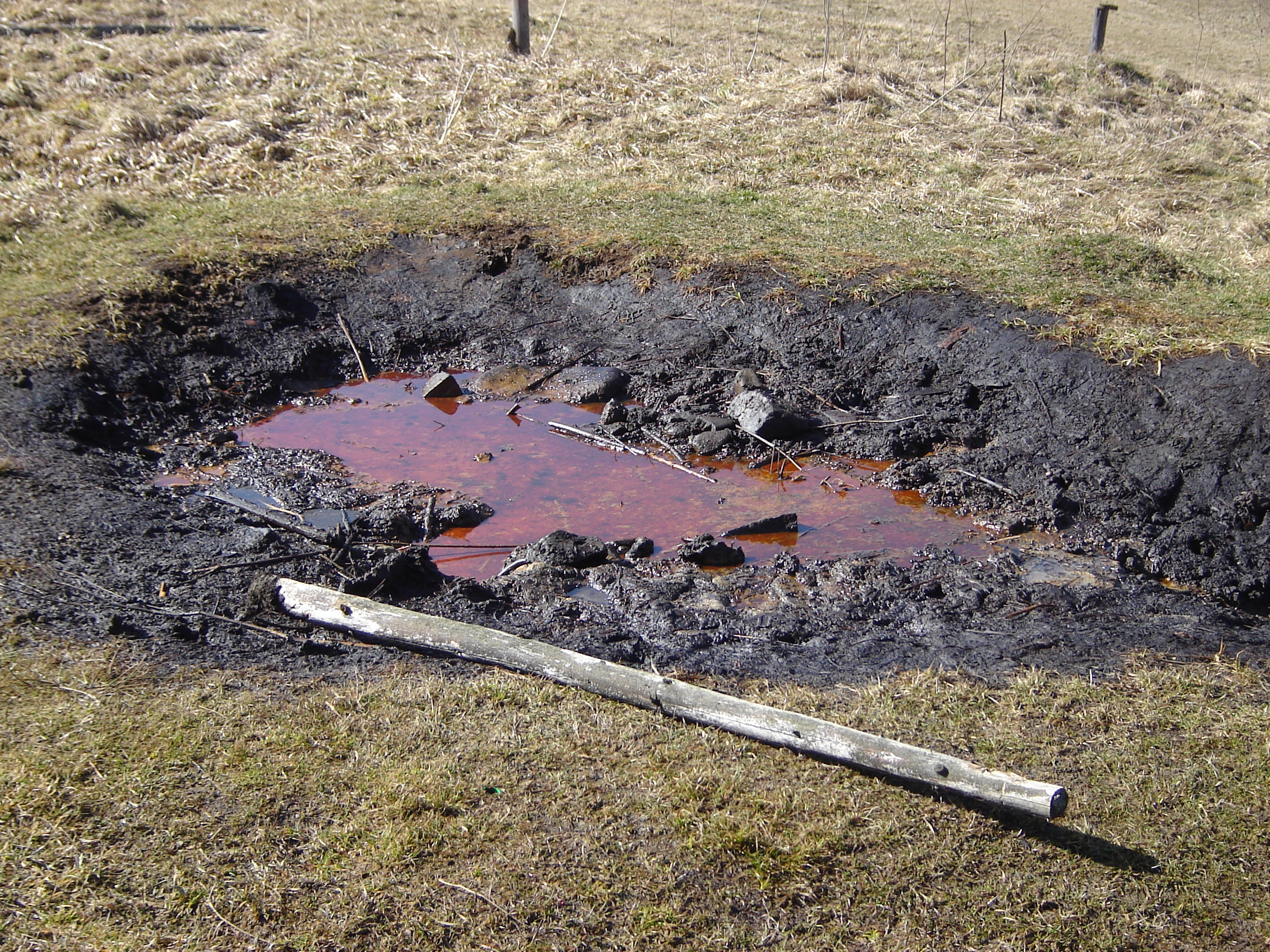
Petroleum seep near the Korňa in northern Slovakia.

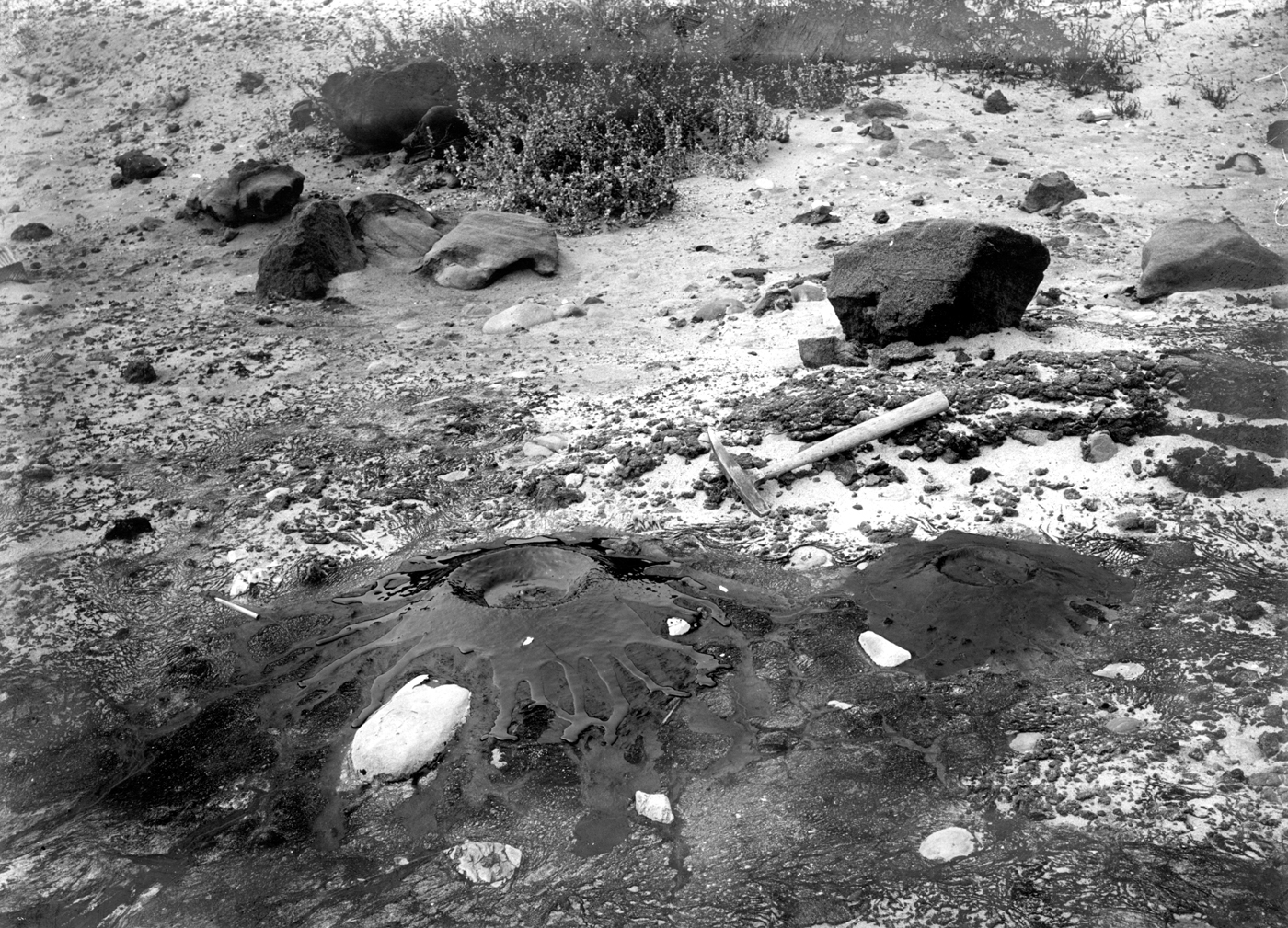
Tar "volcano" in the Carpinteria, California, asphalt mine. Oil exudes from joint cracks in the petroliferous shale forming the floor of mine. 1906 photo, U.S. Geological Survey Bulletin 321

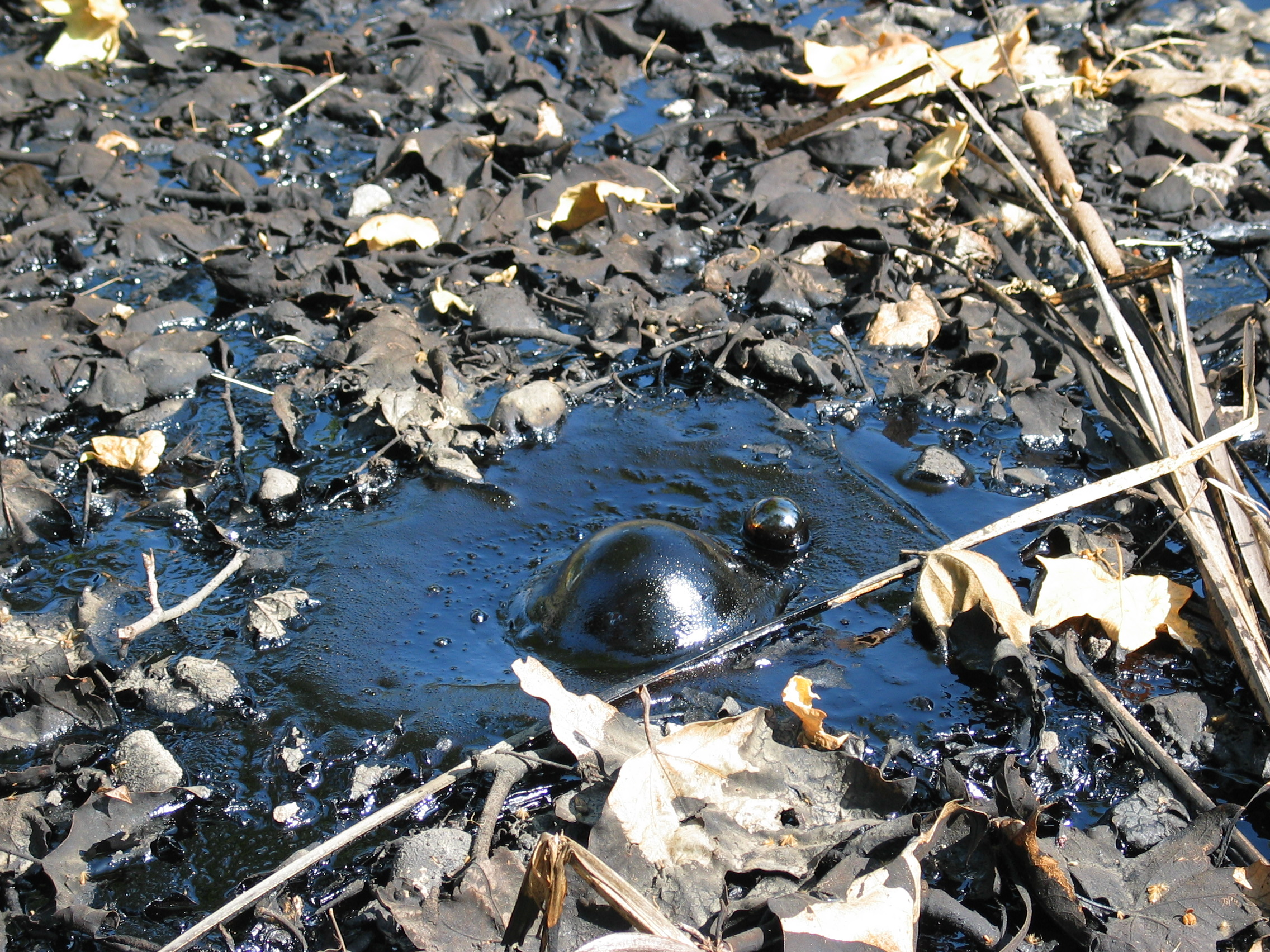
Tar bubble at La Brea Tar Pits, California

A petroleum seep or oil spring is a place where natural liquid or gaseous hydrocarbons escape to the Earth's atmosphere and surface, normally under low pressure or flow. Seeps generally occur above either natural terrestrial or underwater petroleum accumulation structures (e.g., sandstones, siltstones, limestones, dolomites). The hydrocarbons may escape along geological layers, or across them through fractures and fissures in the rock, or directly from an outcrop of oil-bearing rock.

Petroleum seeps are quite common in many areas of the world, and have been exploited by mankind since Paleolithic times. A comprehensive compendium of seeps around the world was published in 2022. Natural products associated with seeps include bitumen, pitch, asphalt and tar. In locations where seeps of natural gas are sufficiently large, natural "eternal flames" often persist. The occurrence of surface petroleum was often included in location names that developed; these locations are also associated with early oil and gas exploitation as well as scientific and technological developments, which have grown into the petroleum industry.

== History of petroleum seep exploitation ==
=== Prehistory ===
The exploitation of bituminous rocks and natural seep deposits dates back to Paleolithic times. The earliest known use of bitumen (natural asphalt) was by Neanderthals some 70,000 years ago, with bitumen adhered to ancient tools found at Neanderthal sites in Syria.

=== Ancient civilizations ===
After the arrival of Homo sapiens, humans used bitumen for construction of buildings and waterproofing of reed boats, among other uses. The use of bitumen for waterproofing and as an adhesive dates at least to the fifth millennium BCE in the early Indus community of Mehrgarh where it was used to line the baskets in which they gathered crops. The material was also used as early as the third millennium BCE in statuary, mortaring brick walls, waterproofing baths and drains, in stair treads, and for shipbuilding. According to Herodotus, and confirmed by Diodorus Siculus, more than four thousand years ago natural asphalt was employed in the construction of the walls and towers of Babylon; there were oil pits near Ardericca (near Babylon), as well as a pitch spring on Zacynthus (Ionian islands, Greece). Great quantities of it were found on the banks of the river Issus, one of the tributaries of the Euphrates.

In ancient times, bitumen was primarily a Mesopotamian commodity used by the Sumerians and Babylonians, although it was also found in the Levant and Persia. Along the Tigris and Euphrates rivers, the area was littered with hundreds of pure bitumen seepages. The Mesopotamians used the bitumen for waterproofing boats and buildings. Ancient Persian tablets indicate the medicinal and lighting uses of petroleum in the upper levels of their society. In ancient Egypt, the use of bitumen was important in creating Egyptian mummies—in fact, the word mummy is derived from the Arab word mūmiyyah, which means bitumen. Oil from seeps was exploited in the Roman province of Dacia, now in Romania, where it was called picula.

In East Asia these locations were known in China, where the earliest known drilled oil wells date to 347 CE or earlier. The ancient records of China and Japan are said to contain many allusions to the use of natural gas for lighting and heating. Petroleum was known as burning water in Japan in the 7th century. In his book Dream Pool Essays written in 1088, the polymathic scientist and statesman Shen Kuo of the Song dynasty coined the word 石油 (Shíyóu, literally "rock oil") for petroleum, which remains the term used in contemporary Chinese.

In southwest Asia the first streets of 8th century Baghdad were paved with tar, derived from natural seep fields in the region. In the 9th century, oil fields were exploited in the area around modern Baku, Azerbaijan. These fields were described by the Arab geographer Abu al-Hasan 'Alī al-Mas'ūdī in the 10th century, and by Marco Polo in the 13th century, who described the output of those wells as hundreds of shiploads. Distillation of petroleum was described by the Persian alchemist, Muhammad ibn Zakarīya Rāzi (Rhazes). There was production of chemicals such as kerosene in the alembic (al-ambiq), which was mainly used for kerosene lamps. Arab and Persian chemists also distilled crude oil in order to produce flammable products for military purposes. Through Islamic Spain, distillation became available in Western Europe by the 12th century. It has also been present in Romania since the 13th century, being recorded as păcură.

=== Eighteenth century Europe ===
In Europe, petroleum seeps were extensively mined near the Alsace city of Pechelbronn, where the vapor separation process was in use in 1742. In Switzerland c. 1710, the Russian-born Swiss physician and Greek teacher Eyrini d'Eyrinis discovered asphaltum at Val-de-Travers, (Neuchâtel). He established a bitumen mine de la Presta there in 1719 that operated until 1986. Oil sands here were mined from 1745 under the direction of Louis Pierre Ancillon de la Sablonnière, by special appointment of Louis XV. The Pechelbronn oil field was active until 1970, and was the birthplace of companies like Antar and Schlumberger. In 1745 under the Empress Elisabeth of Russia the first oil well and refinery were built in Ukhta by Fiodor Priadunov. Through the process of distillation of the "rock oil" (petroleum) he received a kerosene-like substance, which was used in oil lamps by Russian churches and monasteries (though households still relied on candles).

=== Colonial Americas ===
The earliest mention of petroleum seeps in the Americas occurs in Sir Walter Raleigh's account of the Pitch Lake on Trinidad in 1595. Thirty-seven years later, the account of a visit of a Franciscan, Joseph de la Roche d'Allion, to the oil springs of New York was published in Sagard's Histoire du Canada. In North America, the early European fur traders found Canadian First Nations using bitumen from the vast Athabasca oil sands to waterproof their birch bark canoes. A Swedish scientist, Peter Kalm, in his 1753 work Travels into North America, showed on a map the oil springs of Pennsylvania.

In 1769 the Portolà expedition, a group of Spanish explorers led by Gaspar de Portolà, made the first written record of the tar pits in California. Father Juan Crespí wrote, "While crossing the basin the scouts reported having seen some geysers of tar issuing from the ground like springs; it boils up molten, and the water runs to one side and the tar to the other. The scouts reported that they had come across many of these springs and had seen large swamps of them, enough, they said, to caulk many vessels. We were not so lucky ourselves as to see these tar geysers, much though we wished it; as it was some distance out of the way we were to take, the Governor [Portola] did not want us to go past them. We christened them Los Volcanes de Brea [the Tar Volcanoes]."

== Modern extraction and industry ==
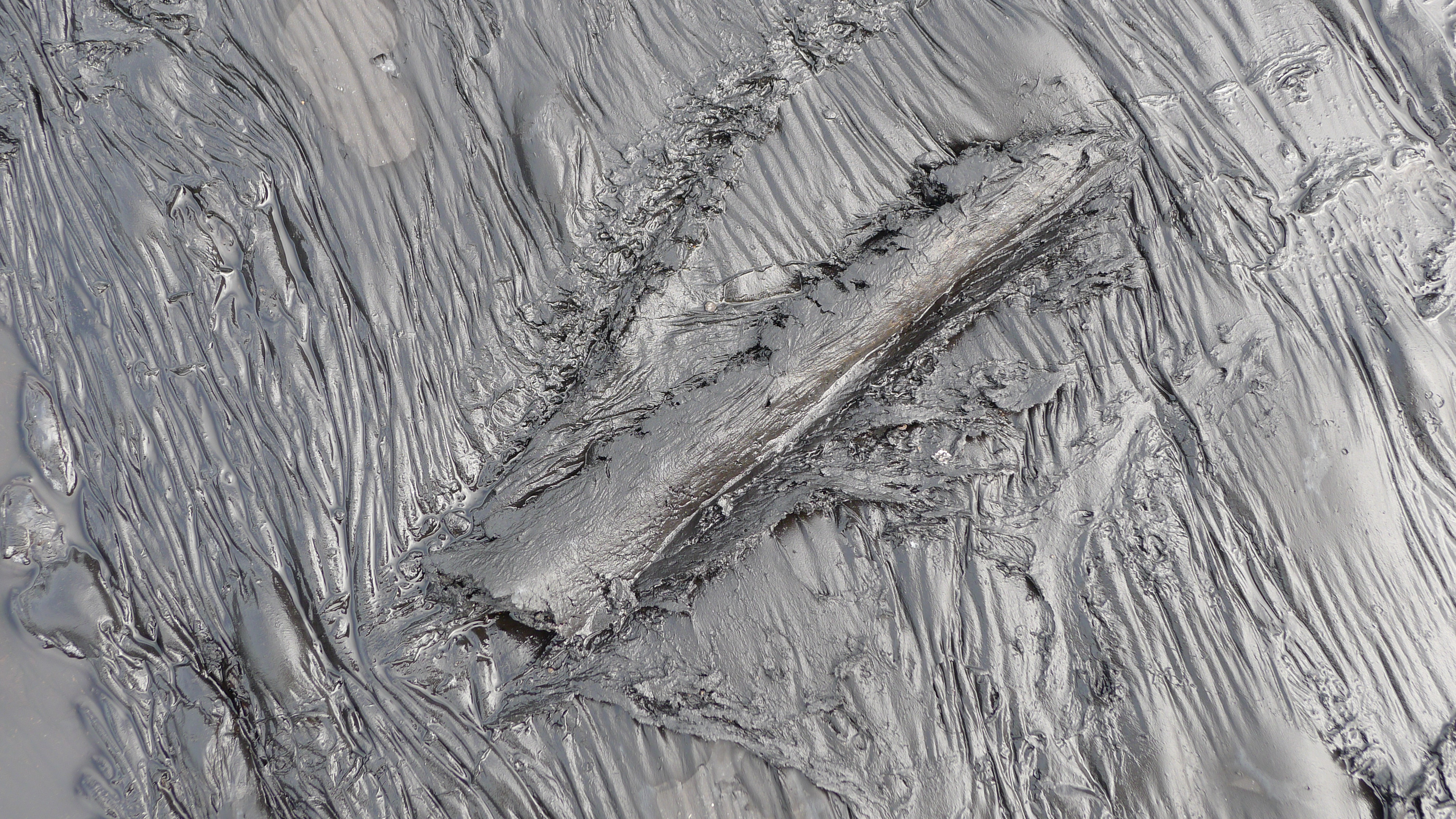
Natural asphalt with embedded wood, Pitch Lake, Trinidad and Tobago. Asphalt has been produced from Pitch Lake since 1851.

During the nineteenth and the beginning of the twentieth century, oil seepages in Europe were exploited everywhere with the digging, and later drilling, of wells near to their occurrences and the discovery of numerous small oil fields such as in Italy.

The modern history of petroleum exploitation, in relation to extraction from seeps, began in the 19th century with the refining of kerosene from crude oil as early as 1823, and the process of refining kerosene from coal by Nova Scotian Abraham Pineo Gesner in 1846. It was only after Ignacy Łukasiewicz had improved Gesner's method to develop a means of refining kerosene from the more readily available "rock oil" ("petr-oleum") seeps in 1852 that the first rock oil mine was built near Krosno in central European Galicia (Poland/Ukraine) in 1853. In 1854, Benjamin Silliman, a science professor at Yale University, was the first American to fractionate petroleum by distillation. These discoveries rapidly spread around the world.

The world's first commercial oil well was drilled in Poland in 1853, and the second in nearby Romania in 1857. At around the same time the world's first, but small, oil refineries were opened at Jasło in Poland, with a larger one being opened at Ploiești in Romania shortly after. Romania is the first country in the world to have its crude oil output officially recorded in international statistics, namely 275 tonnes. By the end of the 19th century the Russian Empire, particularly in Azerbaijan, had taken the lead in production.

The first oil "well" in North America was in Oil Springs, Ontario, Canada in 1858, dug by James Miller Williams. The US petroleum industry began with Edwin Drake's drilling of a 69-foot (21 m) oil well in 1859 on Oil Creek near Titusville, Pennsylvania, both named for their petroleum seeps.

Other sources of oil initially associated with petroleum seeps were discovered in Peru's Zorritos District in 1863, in the Dutch East Indies on Sumatra in 1885, in Persia at Masjed Soleiman in 1908, as well as in Venezuela, Mexico, and the province of Alberta, Canada.

By 1910, these too were being developed at an industrial level. Initially these petroleum sources and products were for use in fueling lamps, but with the development of the internal combustion engine, their supply could not meet the increased demand; many of these early traditional sources and "local finds" were soon outpaced by technology and demand.

== Petroleum seep formation ==
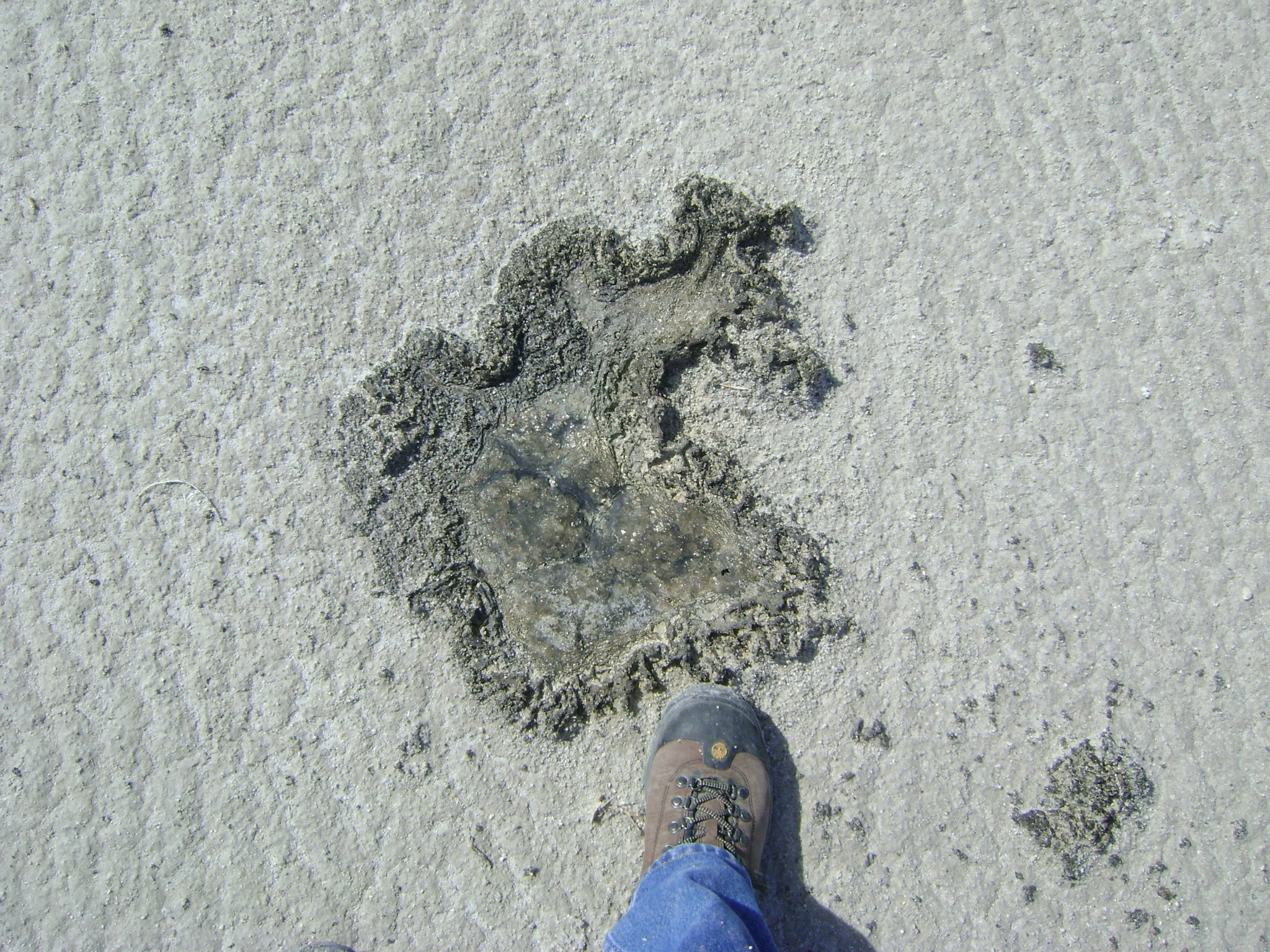
Tar seep at Rozel Point, on the mud (salt) flats of the Great Salt Lake.

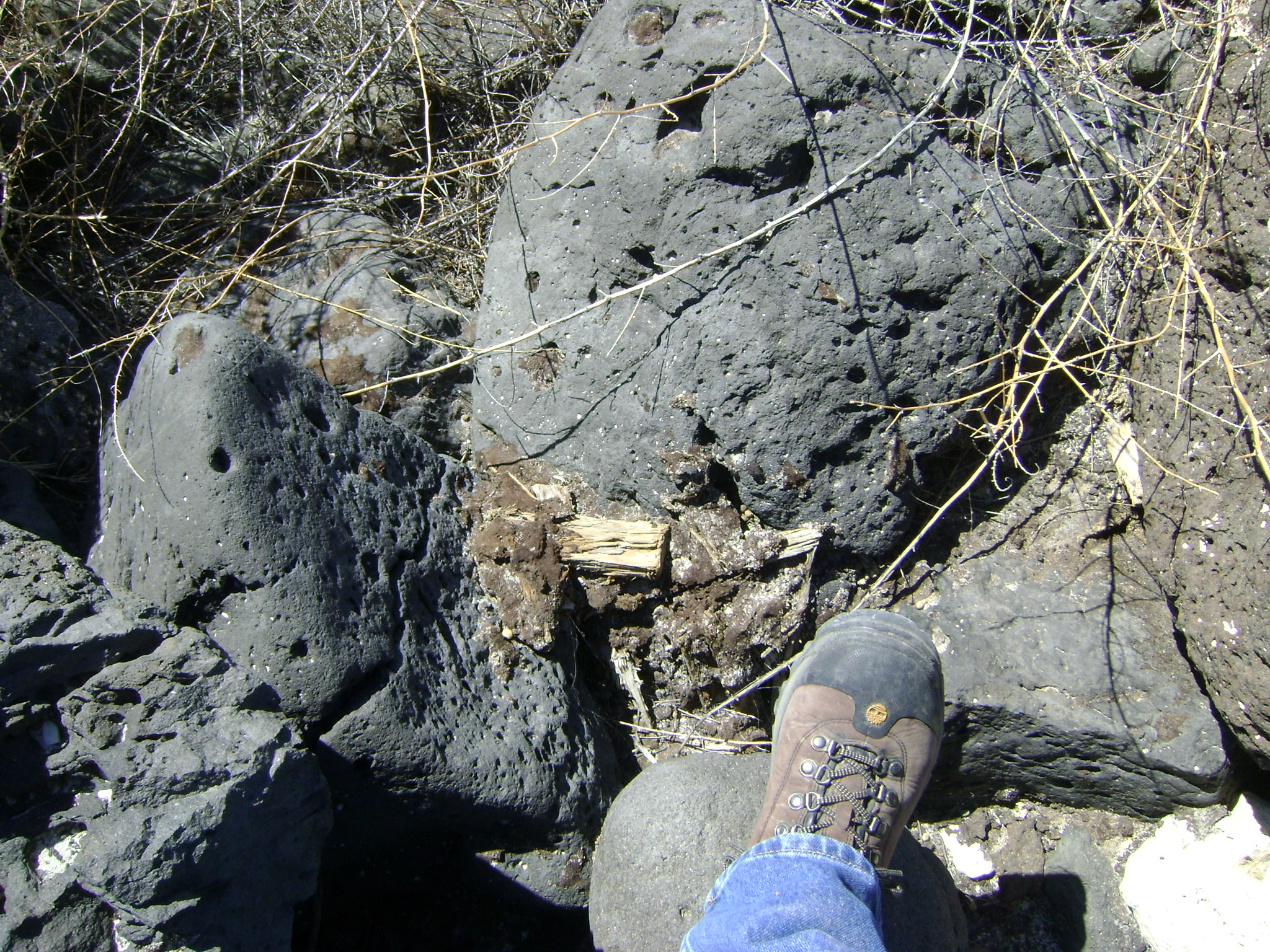
Re-worked tar on beach at Rozel Point, Utah. The black rocks are basalt: the tar is brown and looks like cow manure.

A petroleum seep occurs as a result of the seal above the reservoir being breached, causing tertiary migration of hydrocarbons towards the surface under the influence of the associated buoyancy force. The seal is breached due to the effects of overpressure adding to the buoyancy force, overcoming the capillary resistance that initially kept the hydrocarbons sealed.

=== Causes of overpressure ===
The most common cause of overpressure is the rapid loading of fine-grained sediments preventing water from escaping fast enough to equalise the pressure of the overburden. If burial stops or slows, then excess pressure can equalize at a rate that is dependent on the permeability of the overlying and adjacent rocks. A secondary cause of overpressure is fluid expansion, due to changes in the volume of solid and/or fluid phases. Some examples include: aquathermal pressuring (thermal expansion), clay dehydration reactions (such as anhydrite) and mineral transformation (such as kerogen to oil/gas and excess kerogen).

=== Types of seeps ===
There are two types of seep that can occur, depending on the degree of overpressure. Capillary failure can occur in moderate overpressure conditions, resulting in widespread but low intensity seepage until the overpressure equalizes and resealing occurs. In some cases, the moderate overpressure cannot be equalized because the pores in the rock are small so the displacement pressure, the pressure required to break the seal, is very high. If the overpressure continues to increase to the point that it overcomes the rock's minimum stress and its tensile strength before overcoming the displacement pressure, then the rock will fracture, causing local and high intensity seepage until the pressure equalizes and the fractures close.

== California seeps ==
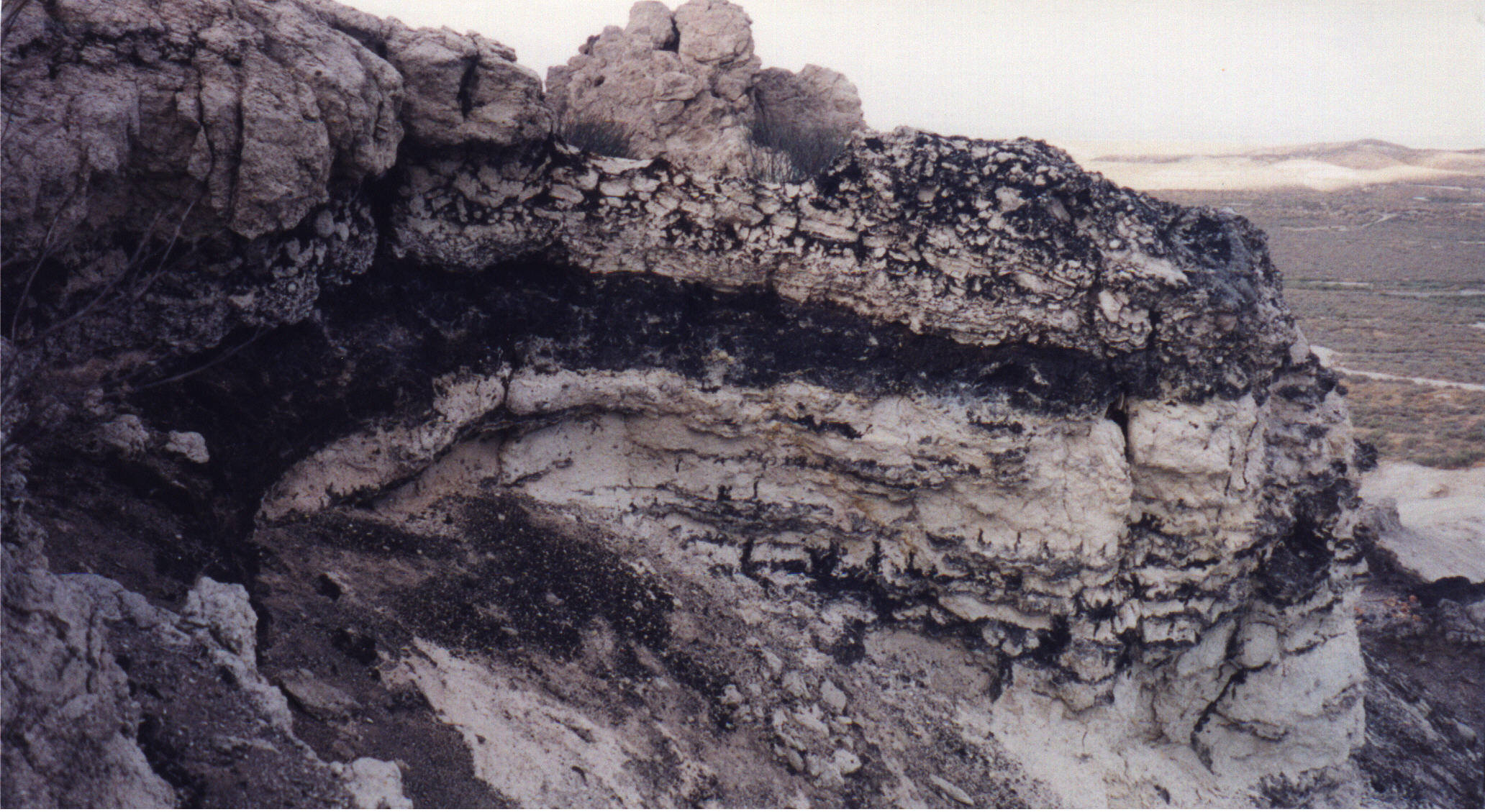
Diatomite outcrop containing oil that seeps out in hot weather, near McKittrick, in Kern County California.

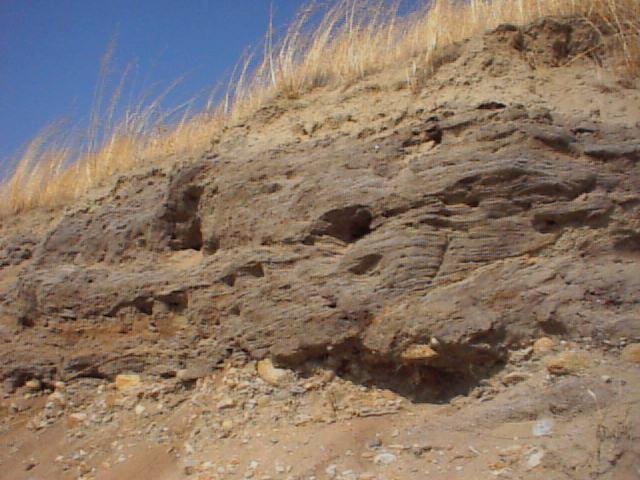
Oil stained outcrop near Kern River oilfield, in Kern County California.

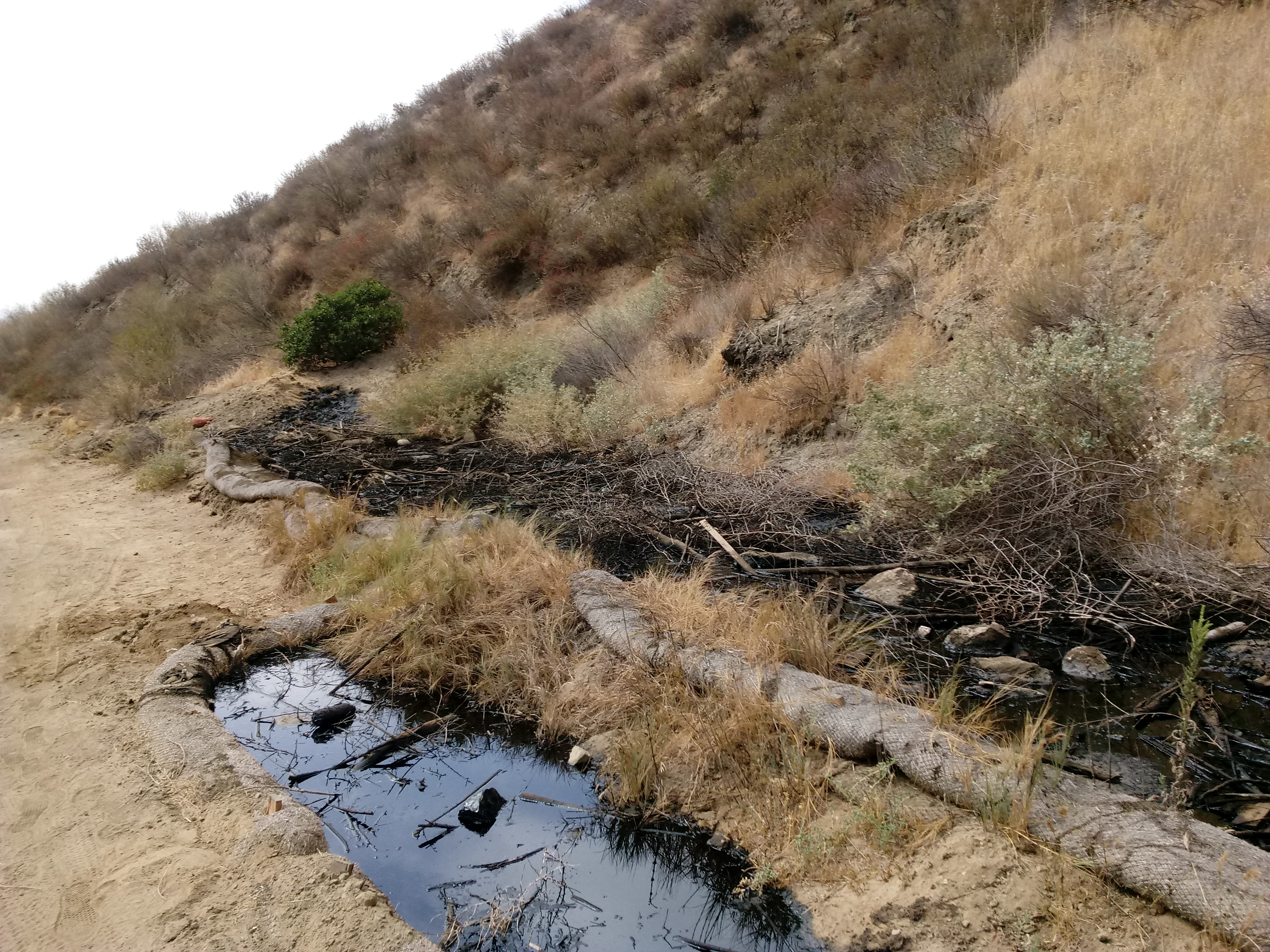
Oil seep in the Simi Valley area of Ventura County, California

California has several hundred naturally occurring seeps, found in 28 counties across the state. Much of the petroleum discovered in California during the 19th century was from observations of seeps. The world's largest natural oil seepage is Coal Oil Point in the Santa Barbara Channel, California. Three of the better known tar seep locations in California are McKittrick Tar Pits, Carpinteria Tar Pits and the La Brea Tar Pits.

At Kern River Oil Field, there are no currently active seeps. However, oil-stained formations in the outcrops remain from previously active seeps.

Seeps known as the McKittrick Tar Pits occur in the McKittrick Oil Field in western Kern County. Some of the seeps occur in watersheds that drain toward the San Joaquin Valley floor. These seeps were originally mined for asphalt by Native Americans, and in the 1870s larger scale mining was undertaken by means of both open pits and shafts. In 1893, Southern Pacific Railroad constructed a line to Asphalto, two miles from present day McKittrick. Fuel oil for the railroad was highly desired, especially since there are very few coal-bearing formations in California. The field is produced now by conventional oil wells, as well as by steam fracturing.

The oil seeps at McKittrick are located in diatomite formation that has been thrust faulted over the younger sandstone formations. Similarly, in the Upper Ojai Valley in Ventura County, tar seeps are aligned with east–west faulting. In the same area, Sulphur Mountain is named for the hydrogen sulfide-laden springs. The oil fields in the Sulphur Mountain area date from the 1870s. Production was from tunnels dug into the face of a cliff, and produced by gravity drainage.

The petroleum fly (Helaeomyia petrolei) is a species of fly that was first described from the La Brea Tar Pits and is found at other California seeps as well. It is highly unusual among insects for its tolerance of crude oil; larvae of this fly live within petroleum seeps where they feed on insects and other arthropods that die after becoming trapped in the oil.

== Offshore seeps ==
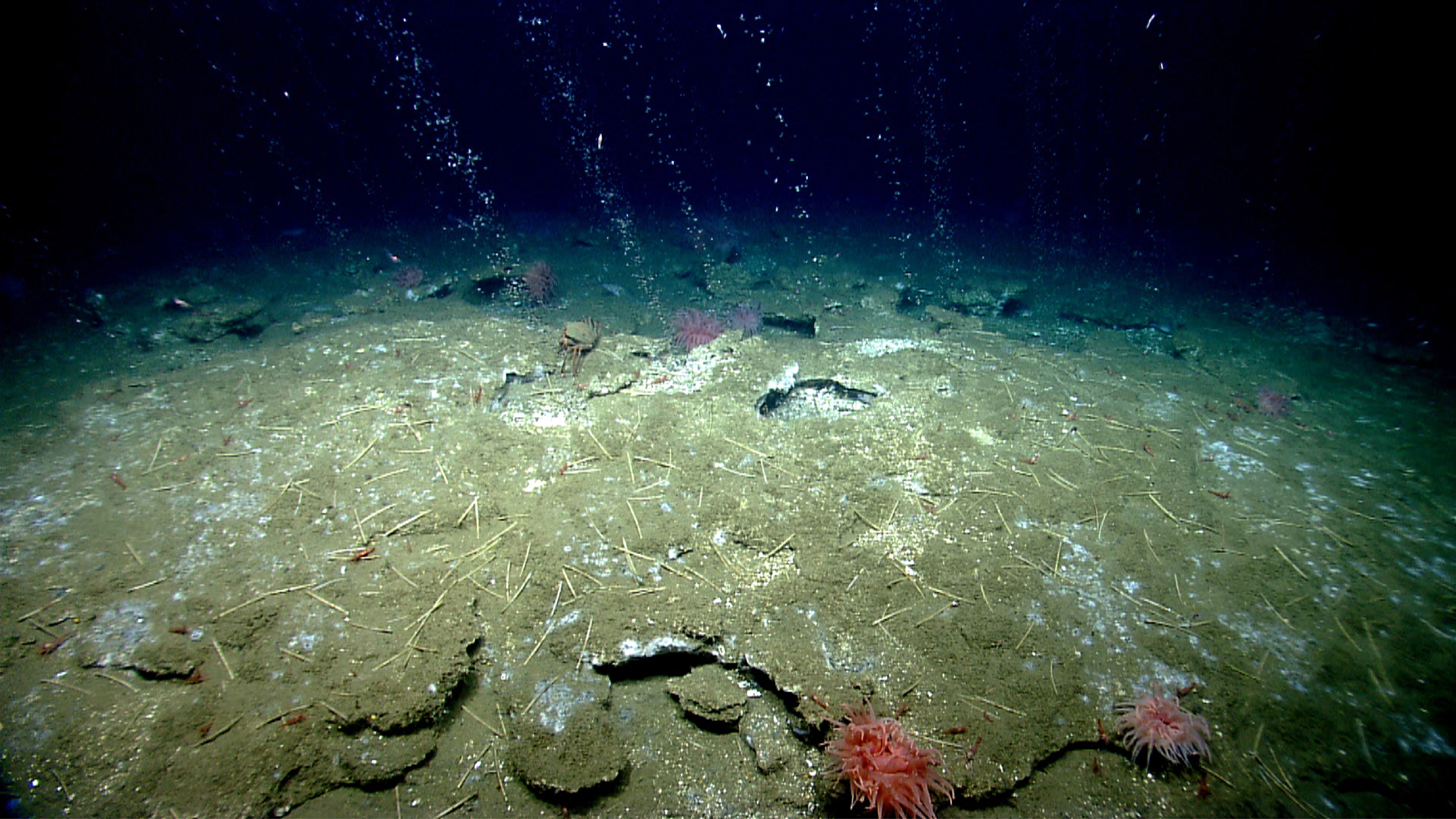
Methane cold seep venting offshore Virginia

In the Gulf of Mexico, there are more than 600 natural oil seeps that leak between one and five million barrels of oil per year, equivalent to roughly 80,000 to 200,000 tonnes. When a petroleum seep forms underwater it may form a peculiar type of volcano known as an asphalt volcano.

The California Division of Oil, Gas and Geothermal Resources published a map of offshore oil seeps from Point Aguello (north of Santa Barbara) to Mexico. In addition, they published a brochure describing the seeps. The brochure also discusses the underground blowout at Platform A which caused the 1969 Santa Barbara oil spill. It also describes accounts from divers, who describe seepage changes after the 1971 San Fernando earthquake.

In Utah, there are natural oil seeps at Rozel Point on the Great Salt Lake. The oil seeps at Rozel Point can be seen when the lake level drops below an elevation of approximately 4,198 feet (1,280 m); if the lake level is higher, the seeps are underwater. The seeps can be found by going to the Golden Spike historical site, and from there, following signs for the Spiral Jetty. Both fresh tar seeps and re-worked tar (tar caught by the waves and thrown up on the rocks) are visible at the site.

The petroleum seeping at Rozel Point is high in sulfur, but has no hydrogen sulfide. This may be related to deposition in a hypersaline lacustrine environment.

== See also ==
- Asphalt volcano
- Cold seep
- Mud volcano
- Tar pit
