= Acapulco (disambiguation) =

Acapulco is a city and major sea port in the state of Guerrero on the Pacific coast of Mexico.

Acapulco may also refer to:

== Geography ==
- Acapulco, Peru, a town in the Zorritos District of the Contralmirante Villar Province, in the Tumbes Region of Peru
- Acapulco (municipality), Mexico
- Sounine plage, a beach nicknamed 'Acapulco' adjoining the village of Sounine, Tunisia
- Acapulco Mexican Restaurant and Cantina, a restaurant chain in the U.S. states of California and Oregon

== Plants ==
- The local Philippines name for Senna alata (= Cassia alata)

== Film and television ==
- Acapulco (film), a 1952 Mexican film
- Acapulco (1961 TV series), an adventure television series on NBC
- Acapulco H.E.A.T., 1993 US crime series
- Acapulco, cuerpo y alma, 1995 Mexican telenovela
- Acapulco (2021 TV series), a comedy streaming television series on Apple TV+

== Astronomy ==
- Acapulco, a 1976 meteorite fall in Mexico
- 6349 Acapulco, an asteroid

== Music ==
- Acapulco (album), an album by Swedish singer Therese Grankvist
- "Acapulco" (song), 2021 song by Jason Derulo
- "Acapulco", a 1988 song by Die Flippers
- "Acapulco", is referenced in the Led Zeppelin song Over the Hills and Far Away from their 5th album Houses of the Holy
- Acapulco (nightclub), a nightclub in Halifax, Yorkshire, England
