= Acca =

Acca or ACCA may refer to:

== Mythology ==
- Acca, one of the comrades of Camilla in Greek mythology
- Acca Larentia, goddess in Roman mythology

== Organizations ==
- Aerospace Industries Association, previously the Aeronautical Chamber of Commerce
- Air Conditioning Contractors of America, a trade group for HVAC professionals
- American Clinical and Climatological Association, founded in 1884
- American College Counseling Association
- American Corporate Counsel Association, now Association of Corporate Counsel (ACC), a group for attorneys of private-sector organizations
- Anglican Catholic Church in Australia
- Antiochian Catholic Church in America, one of the Independent Catholic Churches
- Association of Chartered Certified Accountants, a UK-based global accountancy body which offers the Chartered Certified Accountant qualification
- Association of Christian College Athletics, an organization of collegiate athletics
- Attenborough Centre for the Creative Arts, an arts centre in Brighton and Hove, UK
- Australian Centre for Contemporary Art, an art gallery in Melbourne
- United States Army Court of Criminal Appeals, an appellate court that reviews certain court-martial convictions of U.S. Army personnel

== People ==
- Three Anglo-Saxon bishops:
  - Acca of Dunwich, 7th century Bishop of Dunwich
  - Acca of Hereford (died c. 764), Bishop of Hereford
  - Acca of Hexham (c. 660 – 740/742), saint and Bishop of Hexham

== Science and technology ==
- Acca (plant), a genus of plants native to South America
- Acetyl-CoA carboxylase, in biology
- Adaptive chosen-ciphertext attack, in cryptography
- Advanced Composite Cargo Aircraft, a project of the US Air Force Research Laboratory

== Other uses ==
- ACCA: 13-ku Kansatsu-ka, a Japanese manga series written and illustrated by Natsume Ono
- Acre, Israel (transliterated as "Acca" from an Arabic spelling)
- Acca, a silk fabric decorated with gold, named for the city
- Accumulator bet, in gambling
- Armed Career Criminal Act, in law
- Acapulco (nightclub), a nightclub in Halifax, England known as the Acca
