= Canoas de Punta Sal District =

Coordinates: 3.9458°S 80.9404°W

Canoas de Punta Sal
- District
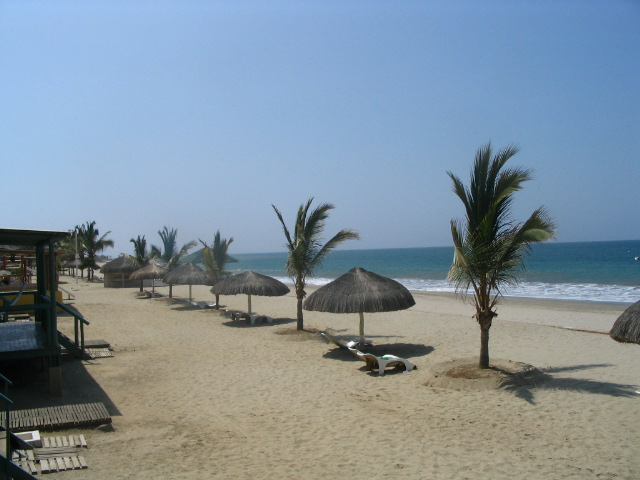

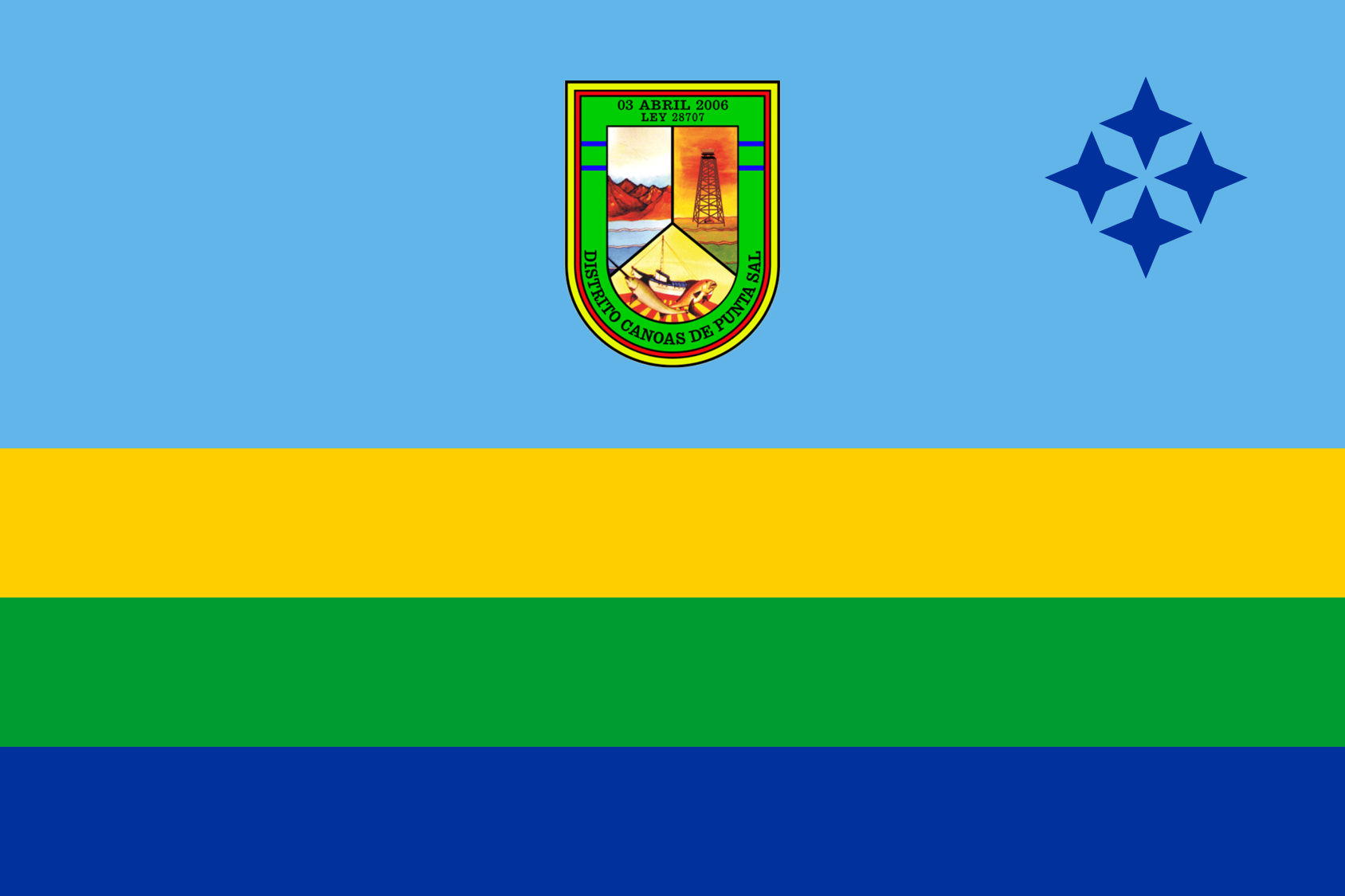
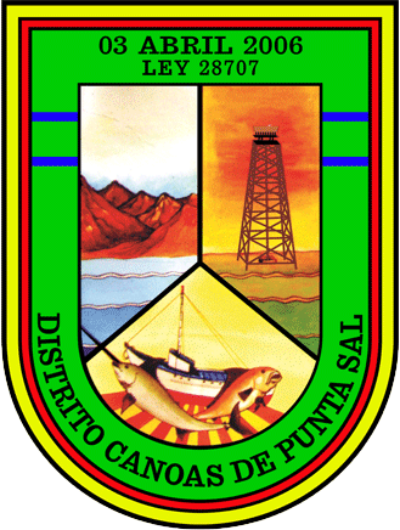
- Flag Coat of arms
- Interactive map of Canoas de Punta Sal
- Country: Peru
- Region: Tumbes
- Province: Contralmirante Villar
- Founded: April 3, 2006
- Capital: Punta Sal

Government
  - Mayor: Reynaldo López Cruz (2019-2022)

Area
  - Total: 623.34 km^{2} (240.67 sq mi)

Population (2017)
  - Total: 6,336
  - Density: 10.16/km^{2} (26.33/sq mi)
- Time zone: UTC-5 (PET)
- UBIGEO: 240203

The district of Canoas de Punta Sal is one of the three districts that make up the province of Contralmirante Villar province, located in the department of Tumbes in northern Peru. It is bordered to the north and west by the Gulf of Guayaquil (Pacific Ocean); to the northeast by the district of Zorritos; to the southeast by the district of Casitas; and to the southwest by the department of Piura.

== History ==
The district was created on April 3, 2006, by Law No. 28707, during the administration of President Alejandro Toledo Manrique.

== Geography ==
It has an area of 623.34 km^{2} (240.67 sq mi). Its capital is the town of Cancas, located at six meters above sea level.

== Demographics ==
=== Population ===
According to the 2007 census, the district has a population of 4,429 inhabitants.

=== Religion ===
According to data from the 2007 census, 83% of the district's population is Catholic, and 13% is non-Catholic. % are members of an evangelical church, 2% state they profess no religion, while 2% say they profess some other belief. In the case of Catholics, from the hierarchical point of view of the Catholic Church, they are part of the Vicariate Forane of Tumbes of the Archdiocese of Piura.
