= Cañaveral, Peru =

Capital of Casitas, Contralmirante Villar, Tumbes, Peru

Cañaveral
- Town and capital
- Location within Peru
- Coordinates: 3°56′S 80°39′W
- Country: Peru
- Region: Tumbes
- Province: Contralmirante Villar
- District: Casitas

Population (1999)
  - Total: 494
- Time zone: UTC-5:00 (EST)

Cañaveral is a town in the Contralmirante Villar Province of the Tumbes Region in northwestern Peru. It is the capital of the Casitas District and has a population of 494 (1999).

== Climate ==
Climate data for Cañaveral (1991–2020)
Month	Jan	Feb	Mar	Apr	May	Jun	Jul	Aug	Sep	Oct	Nov	Dec	Year
Mean daily maximum °C (°F)	32.4 (90.3)	32.0 (89.6)	32.3 (90.1)	32.6 (90.7)	32.6 (90.7)	31.6 (88.9)	31.2 (88.2)	31.0 (87.8)	31.3 (88.3)	31.4 (88.5)	31.7 (89.1)	32.2 (90.0)	31.9 (89.4)
Mean daily minimum °C (°F)	22.5 (72.5)	22.4 (72.3)	22.4 (72.3)	22.1 (71.8)	21.2 (70.2)	19.8 (67.6)	18.7 (65.7)	18.1 (64.6)	18.8 (65.8)	19.5 (67.1)	19.9 (67.8)	21.5 (70.7)	20.6 (69.1)
Average precipitation mm (inches)	57.9 (2.28)	124.3 (4.89)	147.7 (5.81)	71.5 (2.81)	13.2 (0.52)	2.4 (0.09)	0.7 (0.03)	0.1 (0.00)	0.5 (0.02)	0.8 (0.03)	2.7 (0.11)	19.7 (0.78)	441.5 (17.38)
Source: NOAA
