= Casitas District =

Coordinates: 3.9422°S 80.6512°W

Casitas
- District
- Interactive map of Casitas
- Country: Peru
- Region: Tumbes
- Province: Contralmirante Villar
- Founded: November 25, 1942
- Capital: Cañaveral

Government
  - Mayor: Daniel Alex Fernandez Infante

Area
  - Total: 855.36 km^{2} (330.26 sq mi)
- Elevation: 134 m (440 ft)

Population (2005 census)
  - Total: 2,521
  - Density: 2.947/km^{2} (7.633/sq mi)
- Time zone: UTC-5 (PET)
- UBIGEO: 240202

Casitas District is one of the three districts of the province Contralmirante Villar in Peru.
