= Contralmirante Villar province =

Coordinates: 3.6727°S 80.6536°W

Contralmirante Villar
- Province
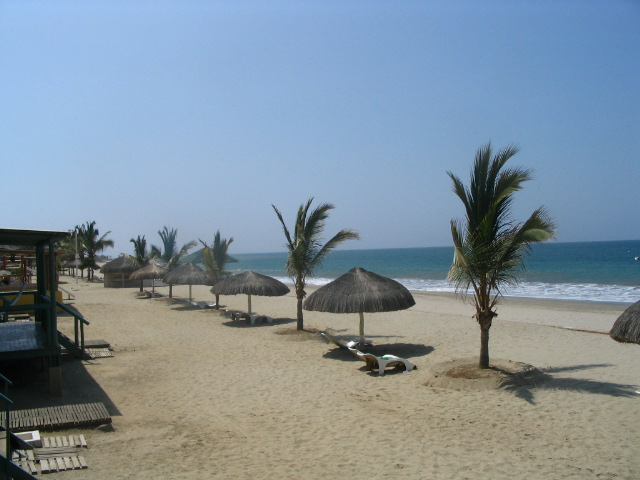
- View of the beach in Punta Sal

- Location of Contralmirante Villar in the Tumbes Region
- Country: Peru
- Region: Tumbes
- Capital: Zorritos

Government
  - Mayor: Jesús Alberto Luna Ordinola

Area
  - Total: 2,123.22 km^{2} (819.78 sq mi)
- Elevation: 6 m (20 ft)

Population
  - Total: 21,057
  - Density: 9.9175/km^{2} (25.686/sq mi)
- UBIGEO: 2402
- Website: https://www.municvz.gob.pe/

Contralmirante Villar is a province of the Tumbes Region in Peru. Its capital is the town of Zorritos.

The Cerros de Amotape National Park is partially located in this province, which is the largest in the Tumbes Region.

== Geography ==
=== Boundaries ===
- North: Pacific Ocean
- East: province of Tumbes
- South: province of Talara (in the Piura Region)
- West: Pacific Ocean

== Demographics ==
=== Largest towns ===
- Zorritos
- Cañaveral
- Cancas
- Acapulco
- Punta Sal

== Political division ==
The province of Contralmirante Villar is divided into three districts (Spanish: distritos, singular: distrito), each of which is headed by a mayor (alcalde). The districts, with their capitals in parentheses, are:

- Casitas (Cañaveral)
- Zorritos (Zorritos)
- Canoas de Punta Sal (Canoas de Punta Sal)
