= Punta Sal =

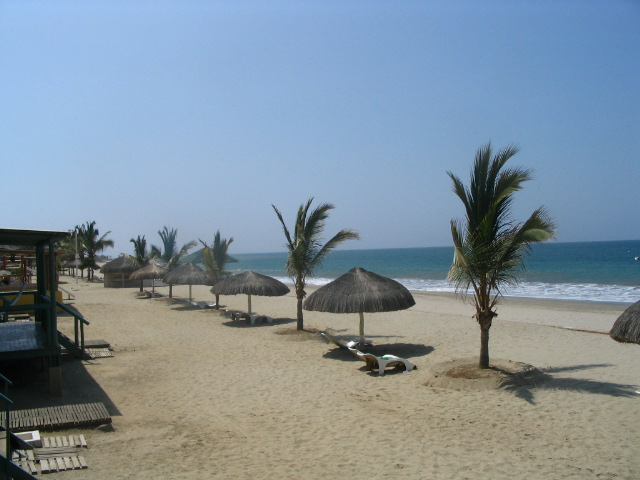
- A beach in Punta Sal

- Location within Peru
- Coordinates: 3°58′50″S 80°58′30″W
- Country: Peru
- Region: Tumbes
- Province: Contralmirante Villar
- District: Canoas de Punta Sal

Government
  - Mayor: Reynaldo López Cruz (2019-2022)
- Time zone: UTC-5 (PET)

Punta Sal is a coastal village located along the Pacific Ocean in the region of Tumbes, northern Peru, and around 110 kilometres (68 mi) from the Ecuador border. Due to its equatorial location, the current of El Niño warms the surrounding sea and the local climate. Punta Sal's beaches, with whitish sands and blue warm waters, have made this area a popular beach resort.

== Geography ==
Punta Sal is considered the longest beach in the northern Peruvian coast. Its 6.5 km of length are divided in two sectors: Punta Sal Chica (a slightly curved shore, encased between two small capes, with white sands) and Punta Sal Grande (a longer beach with less whitish sands). Water temperature is warm (24 °C) all year round; waters are also calm the whole year.

== See also ==
- Tumbes Department
- Contralmirante Villar Province
- Canoas de Punta Sal District
