= Acapulco, Peru =

Coordinates: 3.73725°S 80.768167°W

Acapulco is a town in the Zorritos District of the Contralmirante Villar Province, in the Department of Tumbes, Peru. It has a population of 2,055 as of the 2017 census.
