= Zorritos =

Town in Peru

Coordinates: 3°40′21.6″S 80°39′12.8″W

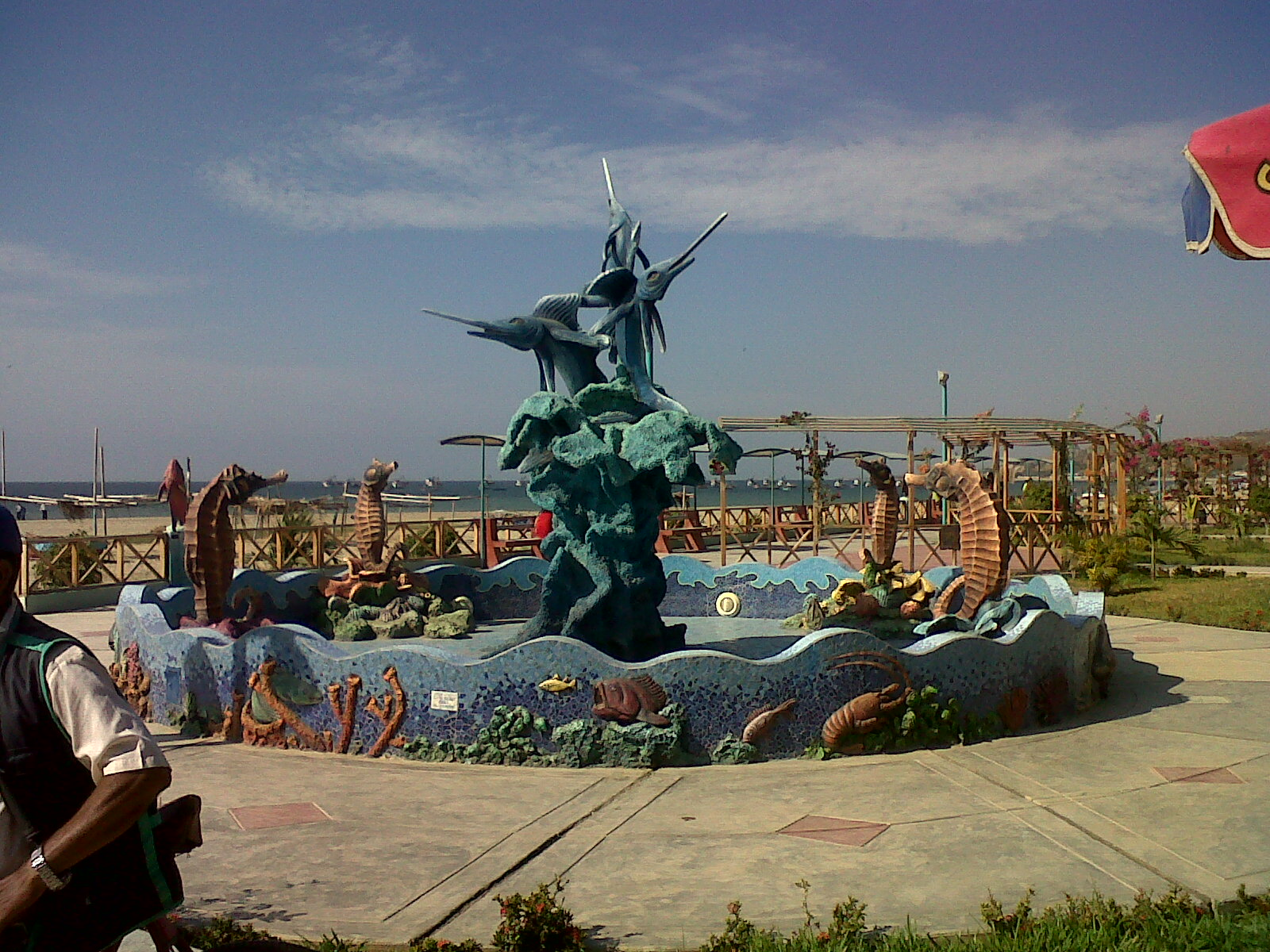
A monument in Zorritos

Zorritos is a town in the Tumbes Region, in northwestern Peru. It has a population of 6,605 (1999) and is the capital of the Contralmirante Villar Province. It is also the main settlement in the Zorritos District. Located 28 km south of Tumbes (the regional capital),

Many beaches are located in the area, where metal leftovers of the old marine perforation platforms can still be seen. Today, these beaches are frequented by the tumbesino youth. The city has several small hotels and seafood restaurants. Zorritos is close to the Cerros de Amotape National Park and to the Hervideros hot springs.
