= Therese Grankvist discography =

Music discography

- Studio albums: 1
- Extended plays: 2
- Singles: 10
- Music videos: 10

The discography of Therese Grankvist, a Swedish pop singer-songwriter, consists of one studio album, ten singles and seven featuring singles.

== Albums ==
=== Studio albums ===
| Title | Details |
|---|---|
| Acapulco | Release date: January 13, 2003; Label: Tretiak; Format: CD |

=== Extended plays ===
| Title | Details |
|---|---|
| Therese Live @ Earhole | Release date: July 23, 2009; Label: Independent; Format: Digital download |
| Missing Disco | Release date: May 10, 2015; Label: Vixon Records; Format: Digital download |

== Singles ==
List of singles, with selected chart positions and certifications, showing year released and album name
| Title | Year | Peak chart positions | | | | Album |
| Title | Year | SWE | FIN | SVK | UK | Album |
|---|---|---|---|---|---|---|
| "Smoke Gets In Your Eyes" (with Vladimir Dikanski) | 2000 | — | — | — | — | non-album single |
| "Det måste vara radion" (with Sahara Hotnights, LOK & Patrik Isaksson) | 2000 | 51 | — | — | — | non-album single |
| "Monkey" | 2002 | 43 | — | — | — | Acapulco |
| "I Need Somebody" | 2002 | — | — | — | — | Acapulco |
| "Time" | 2003 | 17 | — | — | — | non-album single |
| "Feelin' Me" | 2007 | 60 | — | 6 | 61 | non-album single |
| "Shed My Skin" | 2009 | — | 19 | — | — | Missing Disco |
| "Drop It Like It's Hot" | 2010 | — | — | 28 | — | Missing Disco |
| "Remedy" | 2011 | — | — | 9 | — | Missing Disco |
| "Missing Disco" | 2015 | — | — | — | — | Missing Disco |

=== As featured artist ===
| Title | Year | Peak chart positions | | | | | | | | | | Album |
| Title | Year | SWE | AUS | BEL | IRL | FIN | NL | POL | RUS | SVK | UK | Album |
|---|---|---|---|---|---|---|---|---|---|---|---|---|
| "Put 'Em High" (StoneBridge featuring Therese) | 2004 | — | 33 | 3 | 26 | — | 58 | — | — | — | 6 | Can't Get Enough |
| "Take Me Away" (StoneBridge featuring Therese) | 2005 | 54 | 47 | — | 21 | 8 | 54 | — | 97 | — | 9 | Can't Get Enough |
| "The Arrival" (The Attic featuring Therese) | 2007 | 18 | — | — | — | 10 | — | — | — | — | — | Remember Tomorrow |
| "If Only You" (Danny Saucedo featuring Therese) | 2007 | 3 | — | — | — | 9 | — | 2 | 1 | 2 | — | Heart Beats |
| "Another Love" (The Mac Project featuring Therese) | 2008 | — | — | — | — | — | — | — | 256 | — | — | non-album single |
| "Neon Lights (See My Baby)" (Elek-Tro Junkies featuring Therese) | 2009 | — | — | — | — | — | — | — | — | — | — | non-album single |
| "Mandolin" (Jodie Harsh featuring Therese) | 2012 | — | — | — | — | — | — | — | — | — | — | non-album single |

== Other appearances ==
| Title | Year | Artist | Album |
|---|---|---|---|
| "Another Try" | 2006 | Sunblock | I'll Be Ready |
| "Don't You Know Me" | 2007 | The Attic | Remember Tomorrow |
| "Say It (In the Morning)" | 2010 | —N/a | Drop It Like It's Hot EP |
