= Antiochian Catholic Church in America =

Independent church

The Antiochian Catholic Church in America (ACCA) is an Independent Catholic church. What sets the ACCA apart from the majority of independent Catholic jurisdictions is that it espouses the theology and embraces many distinctive practices of the Syriac Orthodox Church and the Indian Orthodox Church, from which the clergy of the ACCA claim to derive apostolic succession primarily via the lineage of René Vilatte. The orders of the ACCA are also derived from the Old Catholic movement, in this case by way of Arnold Mathew. The ACCA, however, is not in communion with any of the Oriental Orthodox Churches.
