= Sounine =

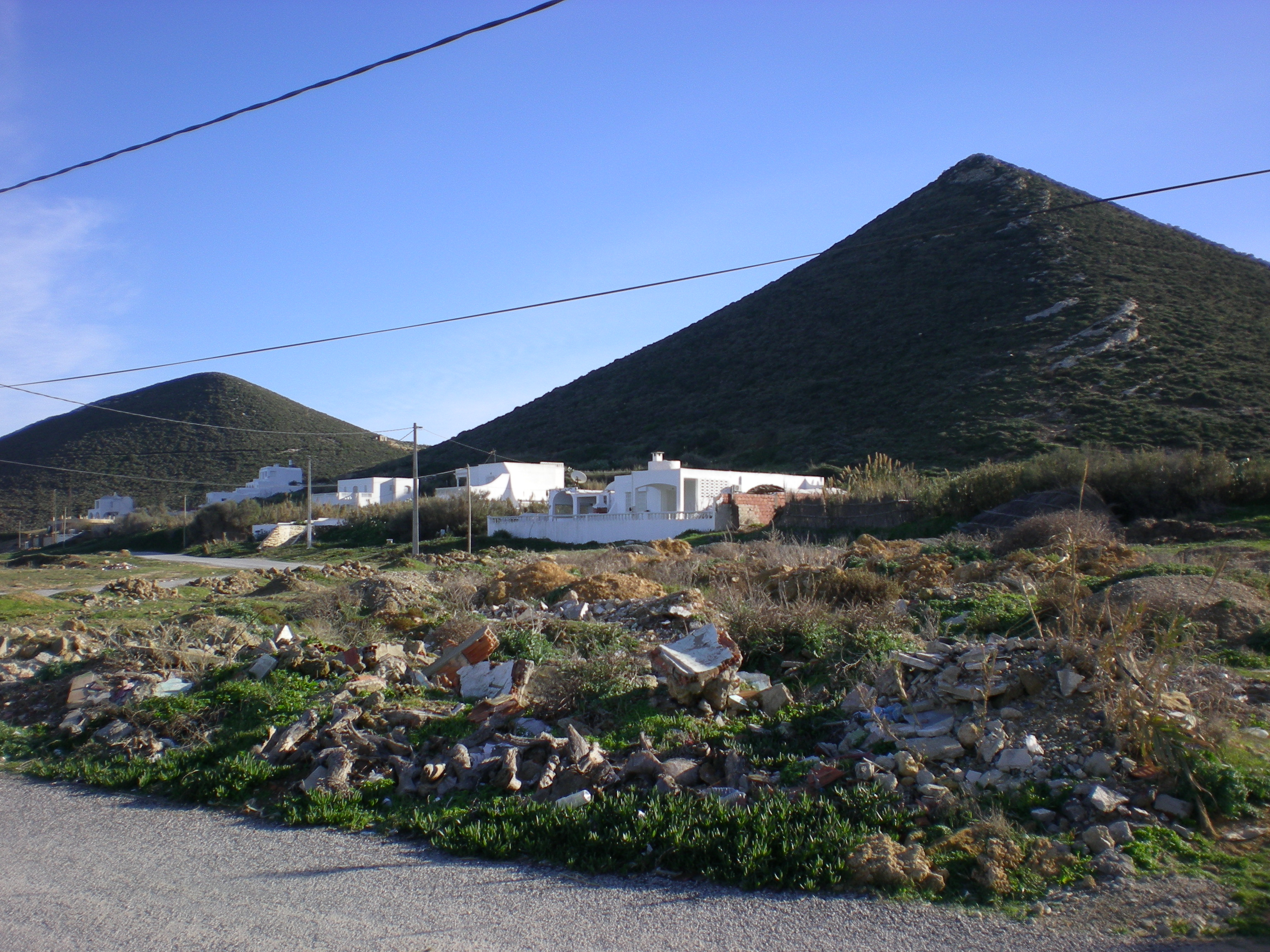

- Location in Tunisia
- Coordinates: 37°12′N 10°10′E
- Country: Tunisia
- Governorate: Bizerte Governorate

Population (2004)
  - Total: 2,000 (est)
- Time zone: UTC1 (CET)

Sounine is a village on the northern coast of Tunisia, 60 km from the capital Tunis and 30 km from Bizerte. The village is split into two main parts: Sounine village and Sounine plage (the beach).

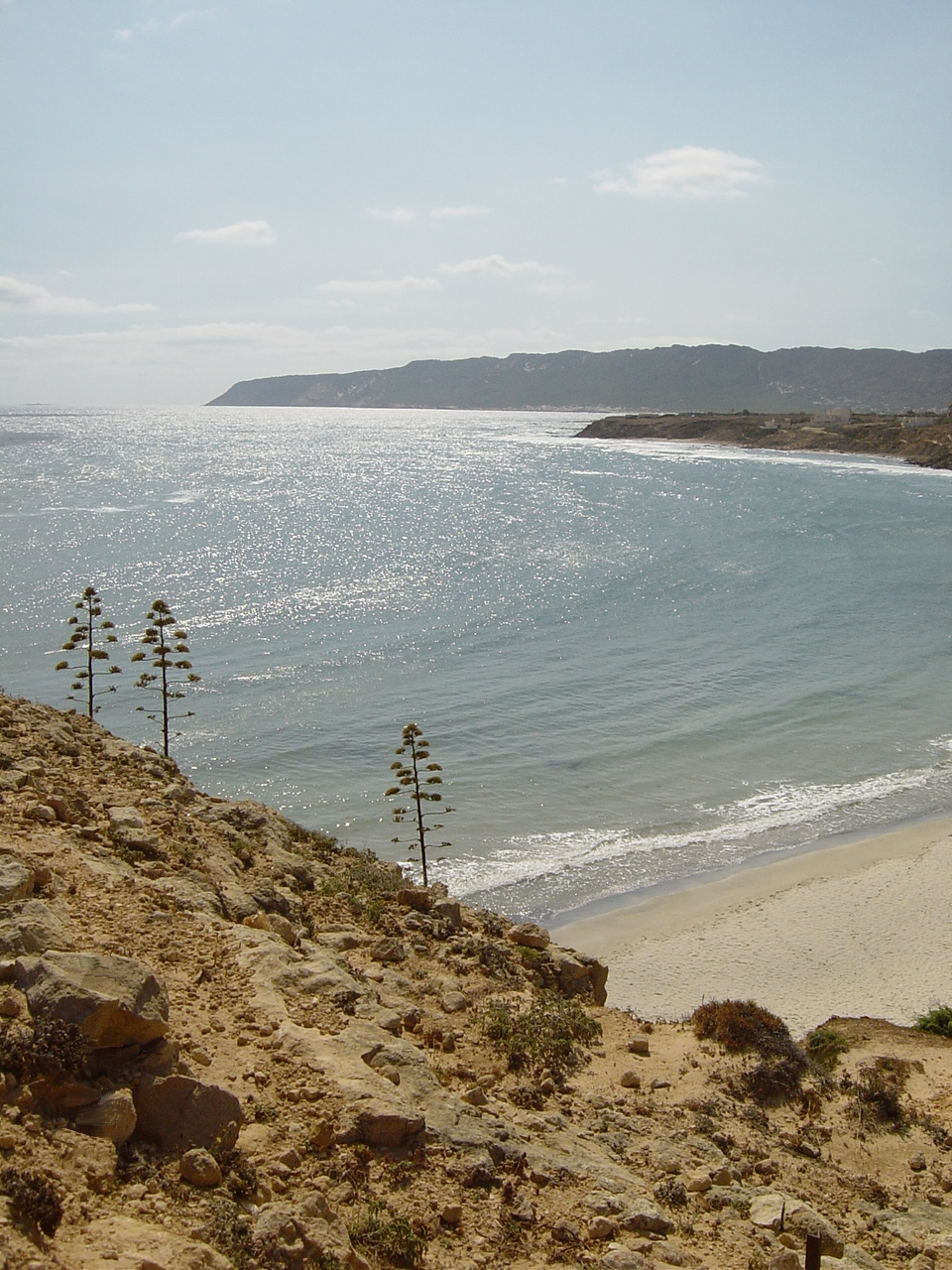
The coastline

Sounine plage is characterized by a seaside with rocks. However, people can easily reach a sand beach by walking 20 minutes along the coast. The sand beach has been nicknamed Acapulco as it looks like its sister beach on the west coast of Mexico.
