= Acapulco (nightclub) =

Nightclub in Halifax, Yorkshire, England

Coordinates: 53.723°N 1.861°W

The Acapulco, also known as the Acca, is a nightclub in Halifax, Yorkshire, England that opened in 1961, and claims to be the UK's oldest.

In March 2022, it attracted media attention for selling its 20-year-old swirly pattern carpet for £5 per A4-size piece.
