= Louis Pierre Ancillon de la Sablonnière =

In 1745 Louis Pierre Ancillon de la Sablonnière established the Pechelbronn bitumen mine at Merkwiller-Pechelbronn, Bas-Rhin, Alsace.

He was an interpreter with the French ambassador to Switzerland, then the General Treasurer of the Ligues Suisses and Grisons.

He learned of Jean Theophile Hoeffel's 1734 thesis "Historia Balsami Mineralis Alsatici sev Petrolei Vallis Sancti Lamperti", which described bitumen springs near Lampertsloch. The farm was later called BächelBrunn/Baechel-Brunn for a "source of a brook" or "Baechelbronner" in 1768 when purchased by the LeBel family.

Along with Jean d’Amascéne Eyrénis, the son of physician Eyrini d'Eyrinis, the developer of the La Presta asphalt mine of Val de Travers, Neuchâtel, Switzerland, he obtained permission to start searches around the spring. He created the first oil company in 1740, putting 40 shares on the market.
