= Issus (river) =

River in Cilicia, Asia Minor

Pinarus River

Location
- Country: Turkey
- Province: Hatay Province
- District: Payas

Physical characteristics
- Source: Nur Mountains (Amanus Mountains)
- Mouth: Gulf of İskenderun, Mediterranean Sea
  - coordinates: 36°45′27″N 36°11′12″E
- Length: 16 to 24 km (9.9 to 14.9 mi)

Basin features
- Progression: Mediterranean Sea

Issus is a river in Cilicia, Asia Minor. It was where Alexander the Great defeated Darius in 333 BC.
