= Merkwiller-Pechelbronn =

- Commune
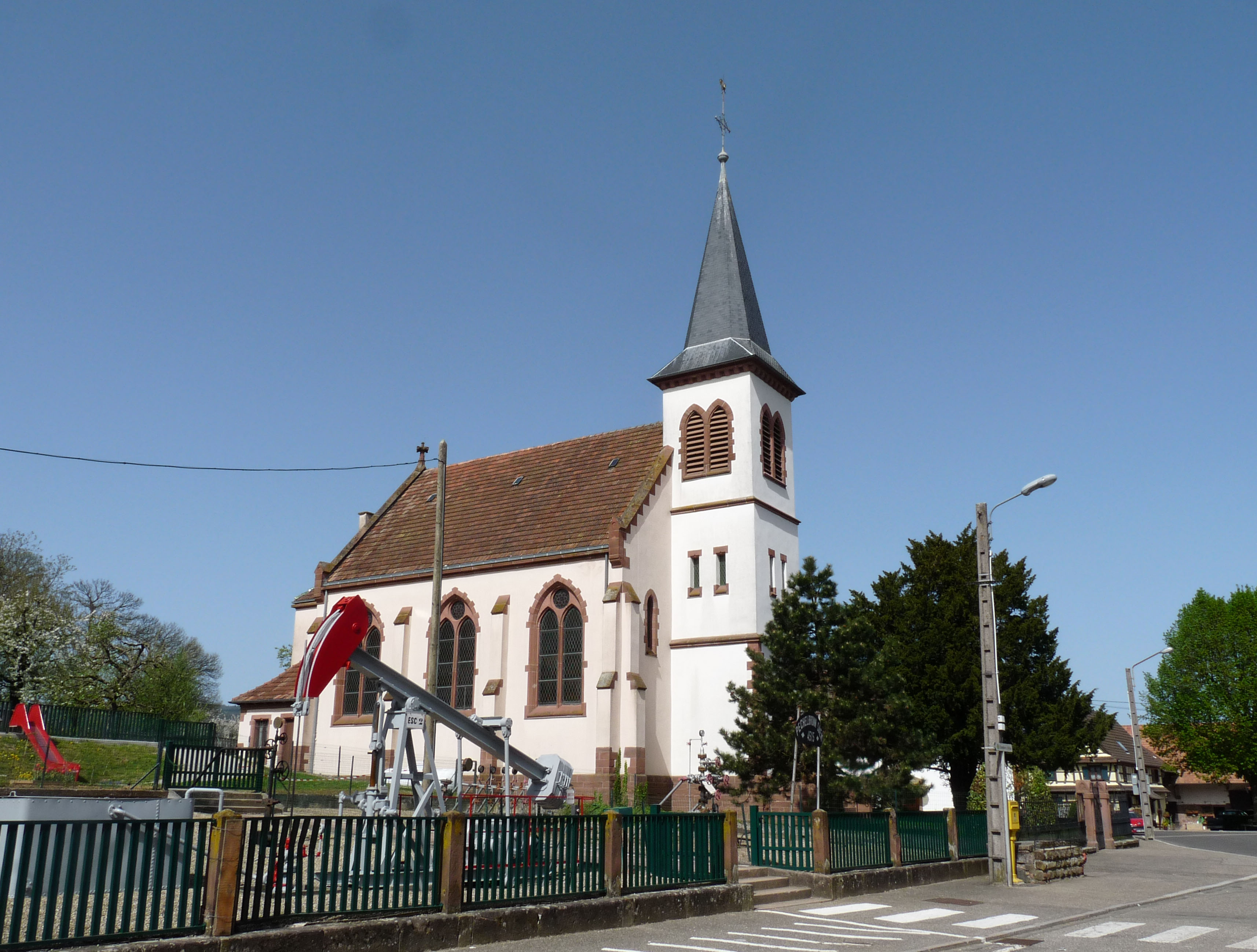
- The church in Pechelbronn

- Coat of arms
- Location of Merkwiller-Pechelbronn
- Location within France Location within Grand Est
- Coordinates: 48°56′N 7°50′E
- Country: France
- Region: Grand Est
- Department: Bas-Rhin
- Arrondissement: Haguenau-Wissembourg
- Canton: Reichshoffen

Government
  - Mayor (2020–2026): Laura Valentine Dorffer
- Area^{1}: 3.76 km^{2} (1.45 sq mi)
- Highest elevation: 199 m (653 ft)
- Lowest elevation: 153 m (502 ft)
- Population (2023): 927
  - Density: 247/km^{2} (639/sq mi)
- Time zone: UTC+01:00 (CET)
  - Summer (DST): UTC+02:00 (CEST)
- INSEE/Postal code: 67290 /67250
- ^{1} French Land Register data, which excludes lakes, ponds, glaciers > 1 km^{2} (0.386 sq mi or 247 acres) and river estuaries.

Merkwiller-Pechelbronn (German: Merkweiler-Pechelbronn) is a commune in the Bas-Rhin department in Grand Est in north-eastern France.

It is notable as the original home of oil sands mining.

Oil sands were mined from 1745 in Merkwiller-Pechelbronn, initially under the direction of Louis Pierre Ancillon de la Sablonnière, by special appointment of Louis XV. The Pechelbronn oil field was active until 1970, and was the birthplace of companies such as Antar and Schlumberger. The first modern oil sands refinery was built there in 1857; and it also had the first school of oil technology.

== See also ==
- Communes of the Bas-Rhin department
