= Antar (company) =

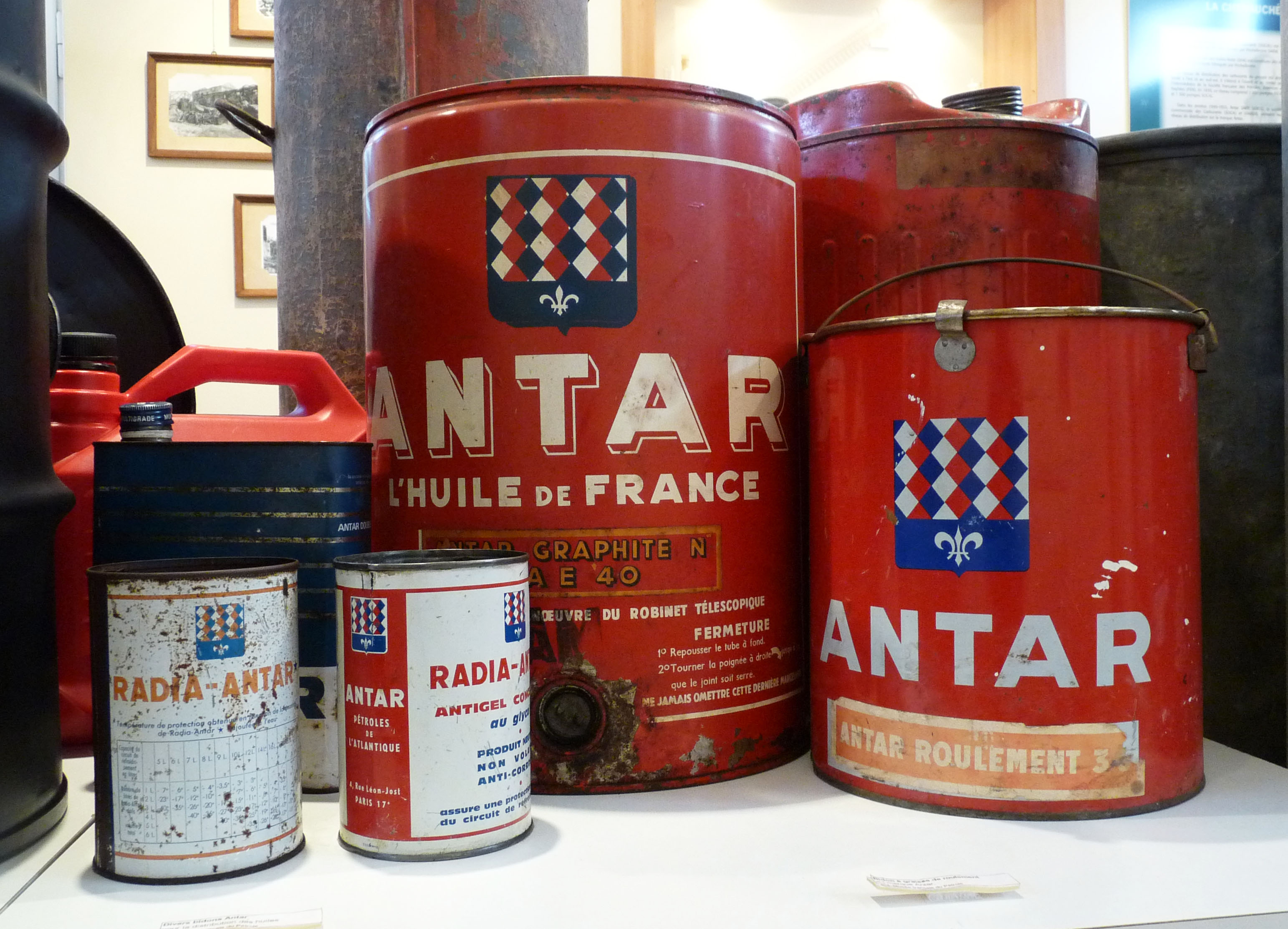

Antar is a former French petroleum company, founded by Pechelbronn SAEM in 1927 in Merkwiller-Pechelbronn, Bas-Rhin, Alsace. However, its origins go back to 1745 when a company was formed to develop the natural oil wells in the vicinity of Merkwiller-Pechelbronn. Prior to World War II it also used the brand Socaline for petrol. After the purchase of another domestic French marketer, the formal name changed to Antar Pétroles de l'Atlantique and the Antar name extended to use on fuels. Antar was largely active in France, although an affiliate had a Swiss joint venture (Socal Fina). The company may have been named after Rimsky-Korsakov's Antar Symphony about the Arab poet and warrior Antarah ibn Shaddad.

In 1976 Elf-ERAP merged with Antar to form the Société National Elf Aquitaine which with over 6,000 outlets became France's second largest petrol retailer. In 2000 Elf was purchased by TotalFina (now Total S.A.). The final dissolution of the company occurred in 2005. The Antar name survives on Antargaz, one of France's leading brands of bottled liquefied petroleum gas, which was sold to a unit of Paribas after the TotalFina-Elf merger to satisfy the European Commission's antitrust concerns, and in 2004 became a wholly owned subsidiary of UGI Corporation.

The only French museum dedicated to the oil industry is located in Merkwiller-Pechelbronn and has resources devoted to Antar.
