= Zorritos District =

Coordinates: 3.6805°S 80.6797°W

Zorritos
- District
- Interactive map of Zorritos
- Country: Peru
- Region: Tumbes
- Province: Contralmirante Villar
- Founded: November 25, 1942
- Capital: Zorritos

Government
  - Mayor: Jesús Luna Ordinola

Area
  - Total: 644.52 km^{2} (248.85 sq mi)
- Elevation: 6 m (20 ft)

Population (2017)
  - Total: 12,371
  - Density: 19.194/km^{2} (49.713/sq mi)
- Time zone: UTC-5 (PET)
- UBIGEO: 240201

Zorritos District is one of the three districts of the province Contralmirante Villar in Peru.
