= Sélestat =

Sélestat Schlettstàdt (Alsatian)
- Subprefecture and commune
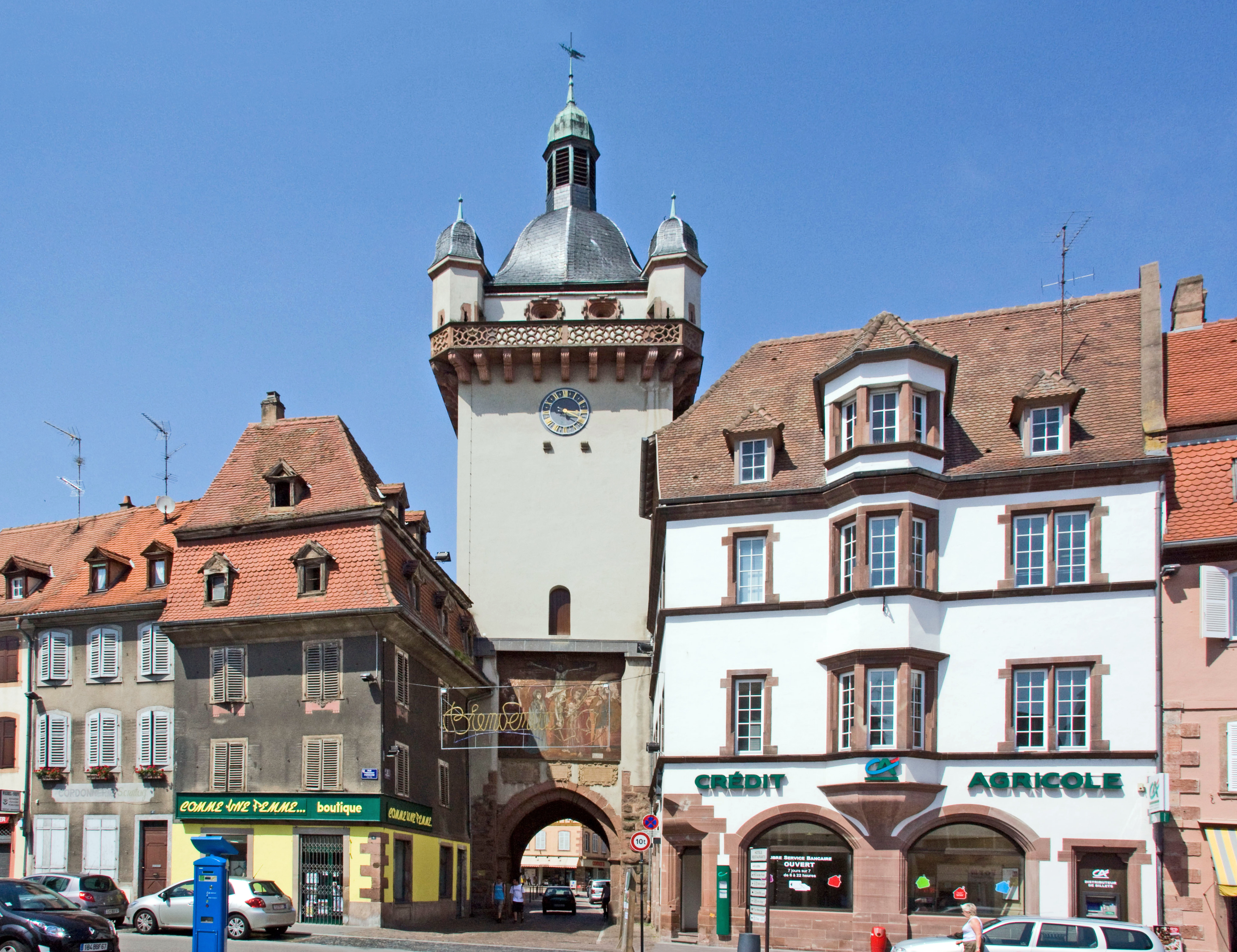
- The Clock Tower

- Coat of arms
- Location of Sélestat
- Location within France Location within Grand Est
- Coordinates: 48°15′34″N 7°27′15″E
- Country: France
- Region: Grand Est
- Department: Bas-Rhin
- Arrondissement: Sélestat-Erstein
- Canton: Sélestat
- Intercommunality: CC de Sélestat

Government
  - Mayor (2020–2026): Marcel Bauer (LR)
- Area^{1}: 44.40 km^{2} (17.14 sq mi)
- Elevation: 173 m (568 ft)
- Highest elevation: 184 m (604 ft)
- Lowest elevation: 165 m (541 ft)
- Population (2023): 19,589
  - Density: 441.2/km^{2} (1,143/sq mi)
- Time zone: UTC+01:00 (CET)
  - Summer (DST): UTC+02:00 (CEST)
- INSEE/Postal code: 67462 /67600
- ^{1} French Land Register data, which excludes lakes, ponds, glaciers > 1 km^{2} (0.386 sq mi or 247 acres) and river estuaries.

Sélestat (French: [selɛsta]; Alsatian: Schlettstàdt) is a commune in the Grand Est region of France. An administrative division (sous-préfecture) of the Bas-Rhin department, the town lies on the Ill river, 17 kilometres (11 mi) from the Rhine and the German border. Sélestat is located between the largest communes of Alsace, Strasbourg and Mulhouse. In 2023, Sélestat had a total population of 19,589.

First mentioned in the 8th century, Sélestat later became a free imperial city of the Holy Roman Empire and prospered as a member of the Décapole. During the Renaissance, it was a noted centre of humanism. Sélestat's fortunes declined amid the turmoil of the Reformation and experienced constant warfare. Following the Peace of Westphalia in 1648, it was formally annexed by France, under which its decline continued though it remained a town of strategic importance.

Sélestat's city walls, reconstructed by Vauban in the late 17th century, were demolished in 1874 after the town (as part of Alsace–Lorraine) was annexed by the German Empire. It became French again after the First World War, was again (informally) annexed by Germany during the Second World War, before finally returning to France. Since 1945, Sélestat has experienced steady growth and become a regional industrial centre and commercial hub.

Sélestat's well-preserved old town features a distinct blend of French and German cultural heritage and is site to numerous architectural landmarks from the Middle Ages and Renaissance. The Humanist Library, inscribed by UNESCO in its Memory of the World Register, houses one of the oldest and most homogeneous collections of medieval and Renaissance works in Europe.

== Name ==
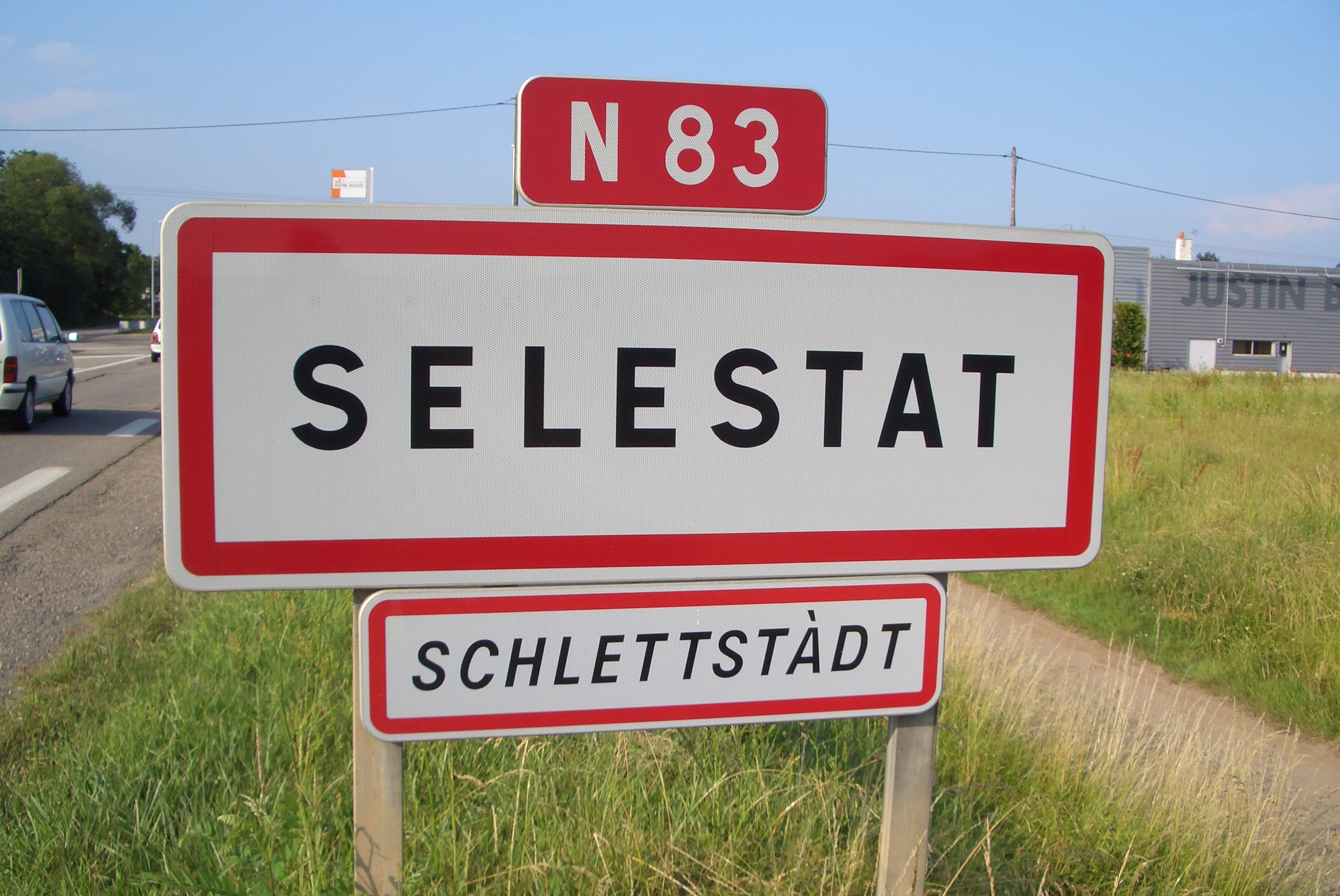
Bilingual French-Alsatian road-sign at the entrance of Sélestat.

The present name of the town is a Frenchification of the original Germanic name. It appeared soon after the French conquest in the 17th century. The town is called Schlettstàdt ([ˈʃlɛd̥ʃd̥ɐd̥]) in Alsatian and Schlettstadt (German pronunciation: [ˈʃlet͡ʃtat]) in German.

Sélestat was first mentioned in 727 as Sclastat. It was mentioned as Scalistati in 775, as Slectistat in 881, as Sclezistat in 884 and as Slezestat in 1095. The current German name, Schlettstadt, appeared in 1310, although various spellings can be noticed on posterior documents, such as Schlestat, Schletstat and Schlettstat. The French administration used various forms from the 17th to the 19th century, such as Frenchified (Sélestat, Sélestadt) and Germanic (Schlestadt, Schelestadt). The town was officially known as Schlettstadt between 1871 and 1919, when Alsace was part of the German Empire. Since 1920, the town's French name is fixed as Sélestat.

The origin of the name "Schlettstadt" is unclear. It probably derives from Germanic words slade or sclade meaning "marshes", and stat for "city". Sélestat would then be a "city in the marshes", a reference to its position in the Grand Ried, a vast area subject to flooding that stretches over the centre of Alsace. Stat could also mean "area" rather than "city".

A popular myth explains that the town takes its name from a dragon called Schletto that founded the settlement after opening up the nearby Lièpvre valley in the Vosges mountains.

== History ==
=== Birth of the town ===
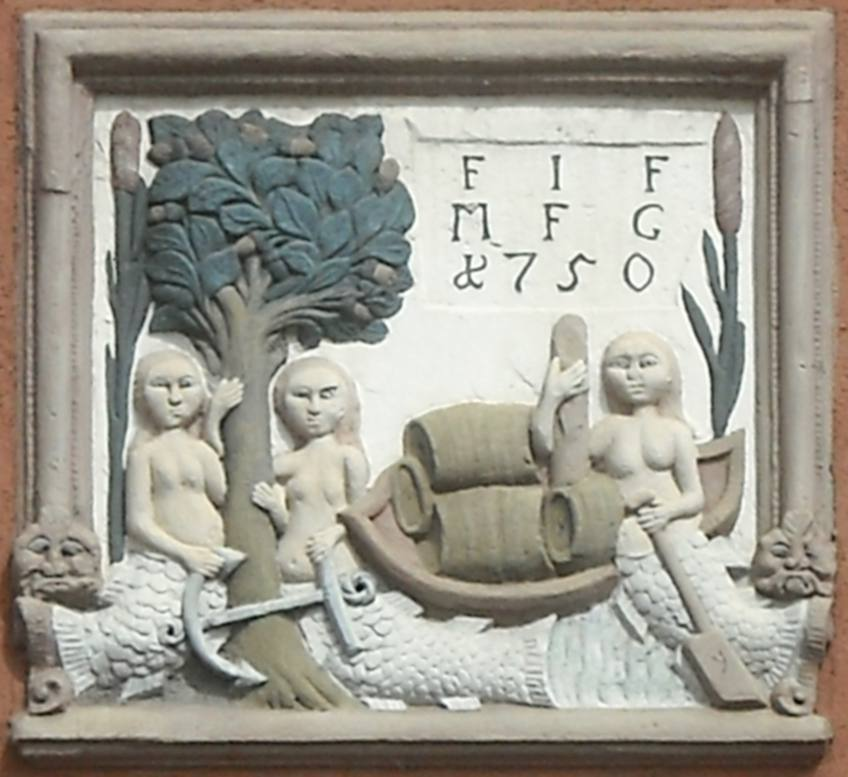
An 18th-century relief on a house in the old town.

Sélestat was first mentioned in 727 AD but the town probably has an earlier Celtic or Roman origin. (Note: Encyclopédie de l'Alsace 1985, p. 6846.) Archaeological findings provide evidence of human settlement during the Mesolithic, the Neolithic and the Bronze Age. A large number of wood piles dating from the 1st and 2nd centuries AD were discovered around St. Quirin chapel, suggesting a Roman settlement. At that time Sélestat might have already been a port on the river Ill.

When Sélestat started to appear in written documents in the 8th century, it may have been a market town or simply a village populated by fishermen and farmers. The area was part of the estate of Eberhard, a member of the Alsatian ducal family, who donated it to Murbach Abbey at the end of his life. In 775, Charlemagne spent Christmas in Sélestat, which indicates that the town must have had enough appropriate buildings and population to accommodate his court and troops.

In the 1080s, Sélestat was the property of Hildegard von Eguisheim, mother of Frederick I, Duke of Swabia, the first member of the House of Hohenstaufen. Hildegard transformed the place into a religious centre when she founded St. Faith's Church, which she gave to the Benedictines of Conques Abbey. Monks from Conques opened a priory next to the church in 1092. The House of Hohenstaufen quickly became the leading dynasty of the Holy Roman Empire, which came to the imperial throne in 1152. Being under their protection, the priory of Sélestat strongly influenced local life. Even though Sélestat constituted a distinct parish, its priest had only limited power and the Benedictine prior was the true head of the municipality. At the end of the 12th century, the Hohenstaufen dynasty gradually lost power and as a result the priory started to decline. The citizens used this opportunity to reduce the prior's dominance (Note: Encyclopédie de l'Alsace 1985, p. 6847.) and secure the power of their parish. They started to build a new parish church in the 1220s. St. George's Church was designed in Gothic style and was significantly larger than St. Faith's Church, another way to signify the end of Benedictine hegemony.

=== Free imperial city ===
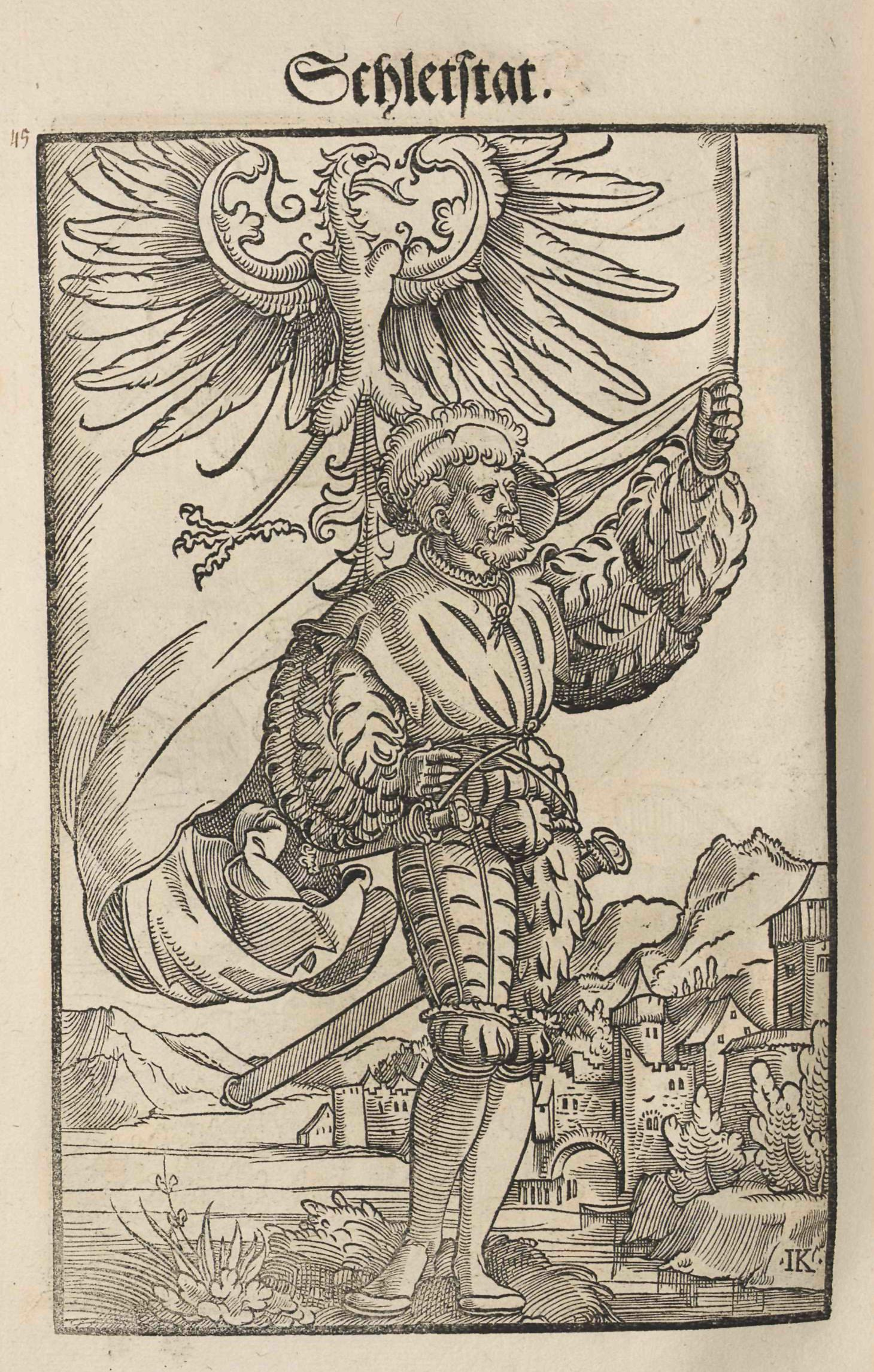
Engraving from Wapen des Heyligen Römischen Reichs Teutscher Nation (1545) with the coat of arms of Sélestat (at that time an eagle instead of a lion).

Frederick II, ruler of the Holy Roman Empire in the 13th century, realised that his dynasty was losing its power and granted freedoms to many cities to keep their allegiance. These cities became Free imperial cities and Sélestat became one of them in 1217. Under the new status Sélestat was able to build city walls and collect taxes on its own. Its serfs and settlers were freed. The German monarch Adolf of Nassau granted Sélestat a constitution in 1292. It was amended many times but it regulated local politics until 1789. Although the new status favoured trade and prosperity, free cities in Alsace were afraid that they would not be defended by imperial forces if a conflict was to occur. So they decided to form an alliance called the Decapolis in 1354, which comprised ten cities: (Haguenau, Colmar, Wissembourg, Turckheim, Obernai, Kaysersberg, Rosheim, Munster, Sélestat and Mulhouse). The seat of the alliance was in Haguenau but its archives were kept in Sélestat. Because the town was the most centrally located, it often hosted meetings of the association. (Note: Encyclopédie de l'Alsace 1985, p. 6848.)

The Benedictine priory was closed in 1424 after many years of decline. It had long lost its power to the local nobility that were gradually replaced by the bourgeoisie in the mid-14th century. Nevertheless, Sélestat remained a religious centre even after the closing of the priory. Convents were established in the 13th century by Dominicans, Knights Hospitaller and Franciscans. Several abbeys located outside of the town also had a residence in town. At the beginning of the 16th century, Sélestat was a noted centre of Renaissance humanism thanks to its celebrated Latin school. Reformers Beatus Rhenanus and Martin Bucer were among the school's alumni. This school helped spread Protestant ideas among the population, although the local authorities remained faithful to Rome. Erasmus of Rotterdam visited Sélestat four times between 1515 and 1522. (Note: Vogler 2009, p. 194.)

Being a free city, Sélestat attracted settlers from the region who sought protection, freedom and a thriving economic environment. The first city wall, which had become too constricting, was replaced in 1280, and a third wall had to be erected in the 16th century as the city grew. At the end of the Middle Ages, the population was estimated at between 5,000 and 6,000. It was then the fourth largest Alsatian town after Strasbourg (18,000), Colmar and Haguenau (6,000 each). (Note: Vogler 2009, p. 181.) The local economy reached its zenith around 1500. (Note: Vogler 2009, p. 183.) It was centered on shipping and trade (mainly hay, cereals, wine, fish, glass, iron and salt). As the road network was poor and dangerous, goods transited via the Ill river.

=== Decline ===
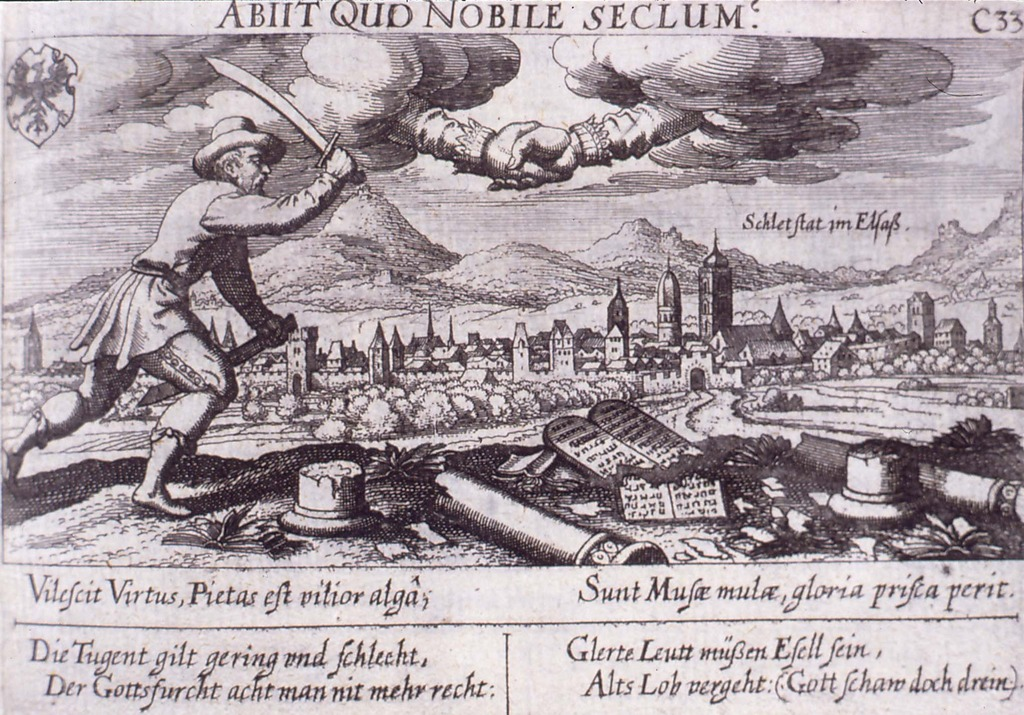
"Are illustrious times gone?", early 17th-century engraving symbolising Sélestat with broken Tables of the Law and columns in the foreground.

The decline of the town started in the 1520s, when the humanist school lost its former influence. The troubles surrounding the Protestant Reformation brought instability and unrest to the region. The town experienced the German Peasants' War in 1525 and its convents were sacked by a mob in 1534. (Note: Encyclopédie de l'Alsace 1985, p. 6849.) During the same period Sélestat lost its pre-eminence in the Decapolis because the city of Mulhouse left the alliance in 1515 and was replaced by Landau in 1521, moving the geographical centre of the alliance to the north. (Note: Vogler 2009, p. 195.)

During the 17th century, Alsace was one of the main battlefields of the Thirty Years War. Sélestat was seized by the Swedes in 1632 after a month-long siege. They surrendered the town to their French allies two years later. The local population long remained predominantly faithful to the House of Habsburg. The Peace of Westphalia (1648) formalised the annexation of the Decapolis by France. (Note: Encyclopédie de l'Alsace 1985, p. 6850.) Sélestat was briefly occupied by the Germans during the Franco-Dutch War in 1674. (Note: Vogler 2009, p. 205.) The Treaties of Nijmegen (1679) that ended the war also abolished the Decapolis.

At first, Sélestat was a major strategic stronghold for the French. Located near the Rhine, it controlled the access to the Vosges mountains and the rest of France. Vauban, the foremost military architect at that time, rebuilt the town walls between 1675 and 1691. However, after the conquest of Strasbourg in 1681 Sélestat lost much of its strategic importance, as Strasbourg was better located. But it remained a garrison town, and the troops stationed there helped to improve the faltering local economy. Although Protestantism was not forbidden in Alsace, French authorities largely encouraged Catholicism and opened three new convents in Sélestat. (Note: Vogler 2009, p. 198.) Jews were expelled from the town in 1642. During the French Revolution the population was extremely conservative and opposed to change. (Note: Encyclopédie de l'Alsace 1985, p. 6851.) The new territorial organisation confirmed the decline of the town, which did not become a prefecture and was not distinguished as a subprefecture until 1806, when it replaced Barr in that capacity. (Note: Vogler 2009, p. 207.) Sélestat suffered from the Napoleonic Wars as it was besieged and bombed by the Bavarians in 1814 and blockaded by a German coalition in 1815.

=== Since 1815 ===
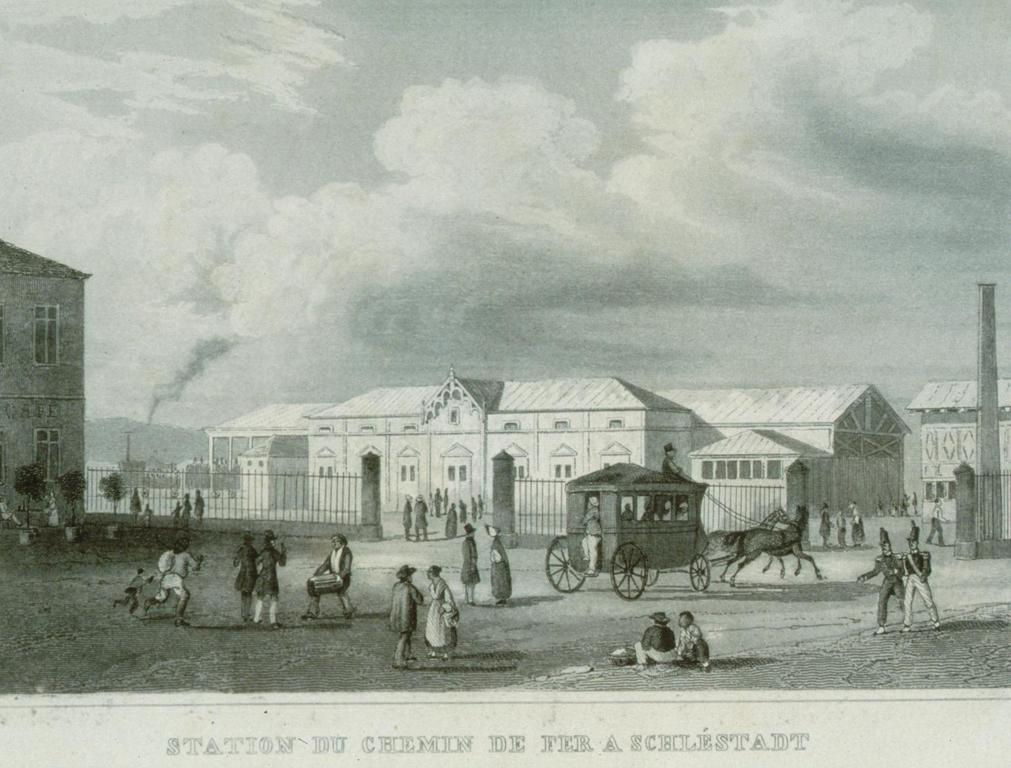
The train station in 1842, soon after its opening.

Industry appeared very early in Sélestat. The town had already several factories at the beginning of the 19th century: a tilery, a sawmill, 12 tanneries and 11 mills. Sélestat quickly became specialised in wire gauze making but it never became a large industrial centre, remaining a small town with limited influence. (Note: Vogler 2009, p. 209.) The completion of the Strasbourg-Basel railway (1840), one of the first to be built in France, did not lead to significant urban development. The town walls that still encircled the town were a significant factor in its economic and demographic stagnation. After the Franco-Prussian War of 1870, Alsace and a part of Lorraine were annexed by the new German Empire. The German authorities demolished the city walls in 1874 and built new spacious neighbourhoods around the old town, as they did in Strasbourg and Metz. (Note: Encyclopédie de l'Alsace 1985, p. 6852.)

Sélestat became French again after the First World War, during which almost a thousand inhabitants died. Following the Battle of France of the Second World War, it was annexed by Nazi Germany. Its liberation took three months and ended in February 1945. The town is a recipient of the Croix de guerre of 1914–1918 and 1939–1945. Sélestat has experienced steady demographic and economic growth since 1945. Its population almost doubled between 1946 and 1999 and two industrial parks were built to accommodate new large factories. The service industry has enriched the town's economy since the 1970s with a large number of small businesses.

South of the town, at 48°15′4″N 7°25′28″E, a large broadcasting facility was used for transmitting on 1161 kHz and 1278 kHz in the medium-wave range. It was opened in 1948 and ceased to emit on 1 January 2016.

== Governance ==
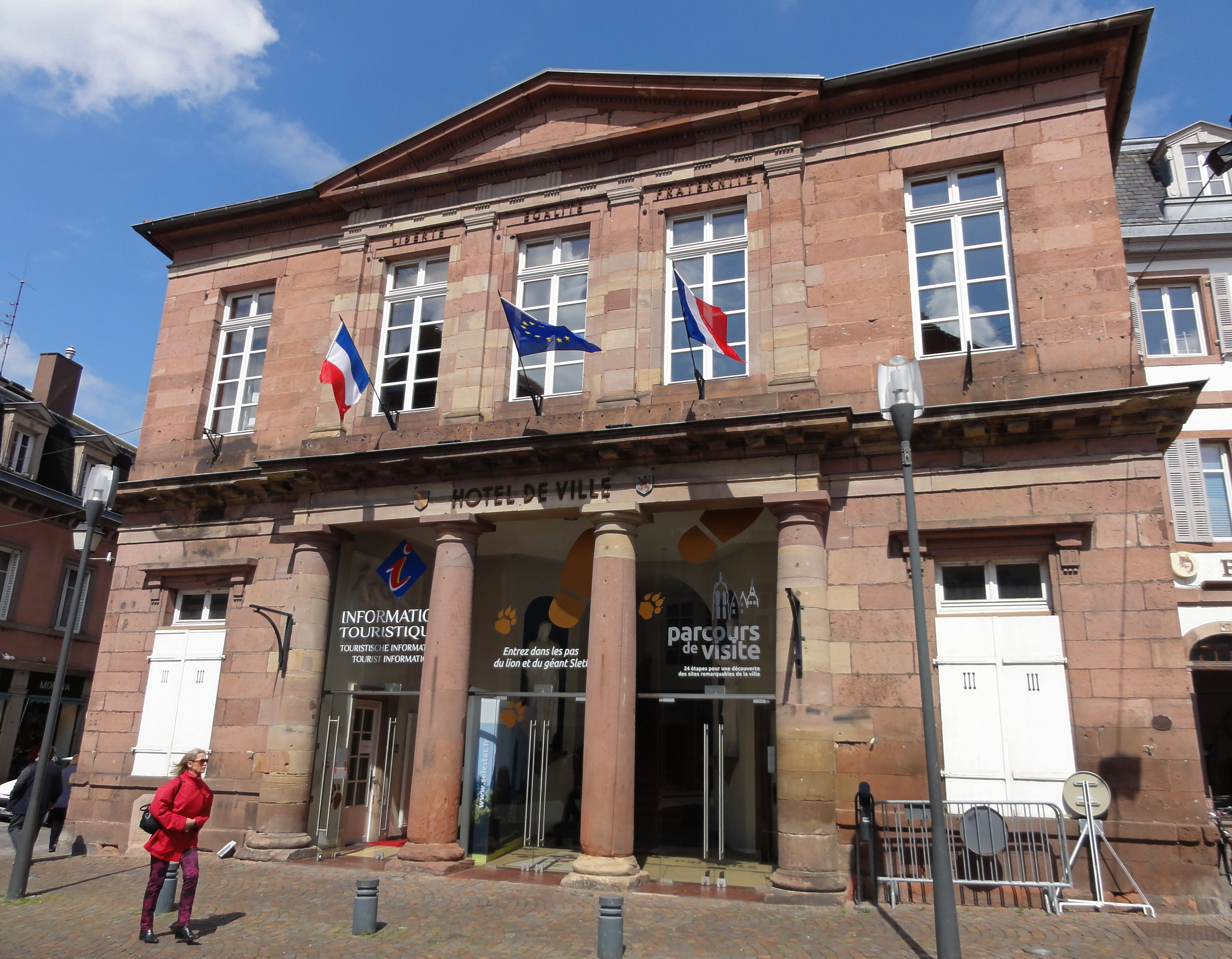
The town hall.

Sélestat is one of the six subprefectures of the Bas-Rhin departement. As such it is at the head of the Sélestat-Erstein arrondissement. Sélestat is also the administrative centre of a canton including 28 other communes which primarily serve as a constituency for local elections. Sélestat is part of the 5th Bas-Rhin constituency for national elections. Since 2002, the Member of the National Assembly for the constituency has been the Republican Antoine Herth.

Sélestat is a member of a federation of communes with shared competencies: the Communauté de communes de Sélestat. Sélestat is its main town, and it includes 11 neighbouring villages. It was created in 1995 to replace an older but similar structure founded in 1969. Sélestat is also the seat of the Central Alsace pays, a structure aiming at developing the area.

The town has had a council since 1292, when it was granted a constitution under the Holy Roman Empire. The constitution shaped the local political system until the French Revolution of 1789. Since then, the town has been administered as all the other communes of France. Its council currently comprises 33 councillors, whose number is defined by law according to the size of the population. The town also has a mayor elected by the councillors.

Alsace in general is a stronghold of the French right. The main French right-wing party, The Republicans, currently holds a large majority in the council (26 councillors). Marcel Bauer, who has been mayor since 2001, is also a member of that party. Voters in Sélestat generally favour right-wing candidates at other elections as well, although Sélestat was governed by the Socialist Party between 1989 and 2001.

== Geography ==
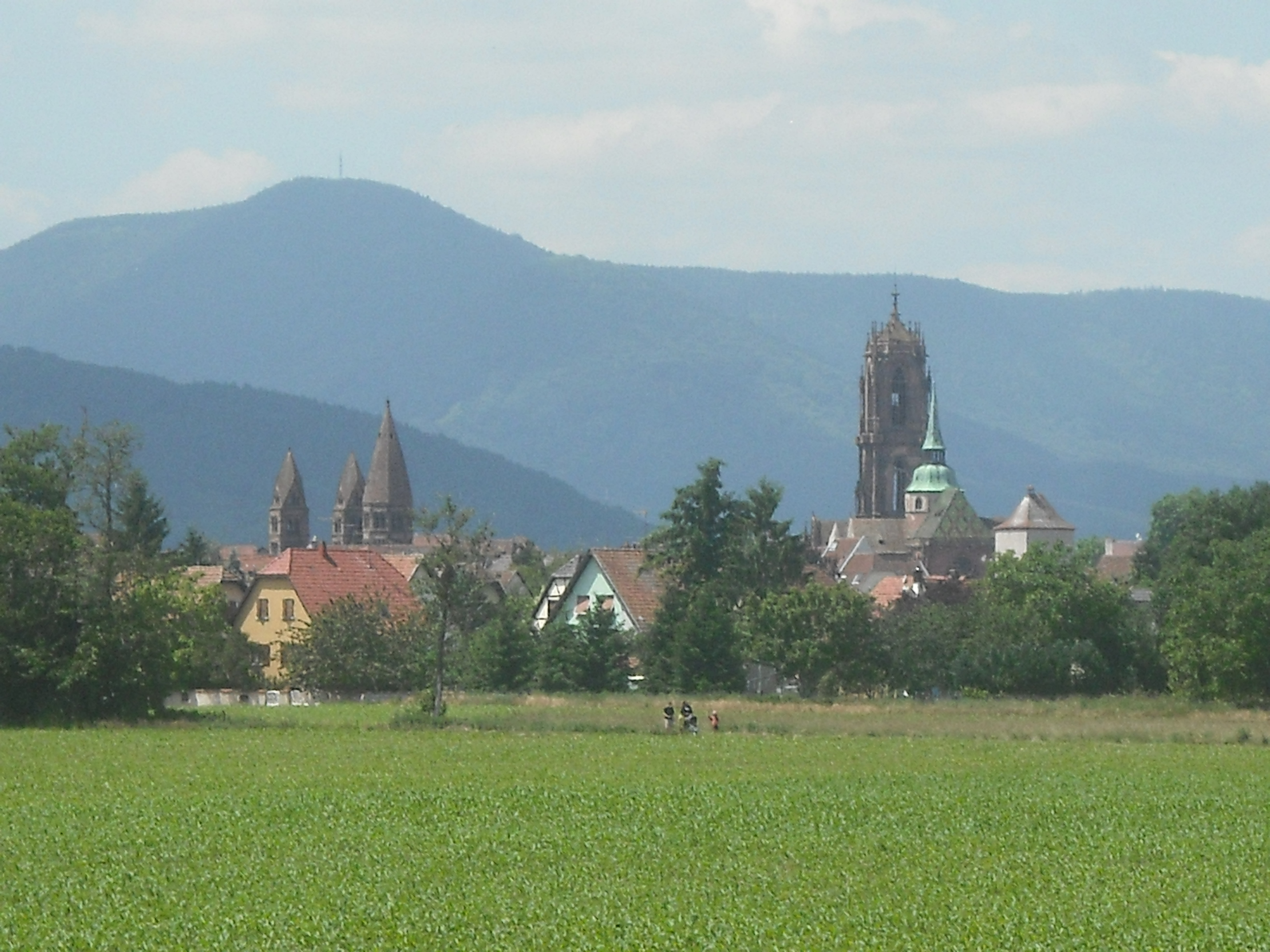
Sélestat and its bell towers with the Vosges mountains in the background.

Sélestat is located at the very centre of Alsace, near the limit separating the Bas-Rhin and Haut-Rhin departments, which traditionally correspond to Lower and Upper Alsace, respectively. The town is located between Strasbourg and Mulhouse, the first being 42 kilometres (26 mi) north and the latter 57 kilometres (35 mi) south of the city. Sélestat is also located between Obernai (22 kilometres (14 mi)) and Colmar (21 kilometres (13 mi)). On the other side of the Rhine, Freiburg im Breisgau is around 40 kilometres (25 mi) distant.

Sélestat lies on the Alsace plains, a narrow, very fertile area that stretches between the Rhine and the Vosges mountains. The Ill flows parallel to the Rhine and crosses Sélestat. This river frequently branches and swells, making the area very wet and subject to flooding. Sélestat is only 4 kilometres (2 mi) from the Vosges, (Note: Dorlan 2002, p. XIV.) at the opening of one of the rare valleys crossing the mountain range and providing a connection to the rest of France. (Note: Encyclopédie de l'Alsace 1985, p. 6828.) This valley corresponds to the course of the Giessen, a 35 kilometres (22 mi) long tributary of the Ill. In contrast to the Ill, which has a constant annual flow, the Giessen is a mountain river subject to sudden increases in the water level, especially during the spring thaw period. The Giessen passes north of the town and meets the Ill several kilometers to the east, in Ebersmunster.

The town itself is built on the Giessen alluvial fan so it is slightly higher than the rest of the Alsace plains. Much of its territory is however located on areas liable to flooding. Such areas are mostly located inside the Illwald natural reserve and comprise both forests and meadows. There the Ill forms more than 150 kilometres (93 mi) of waterways.

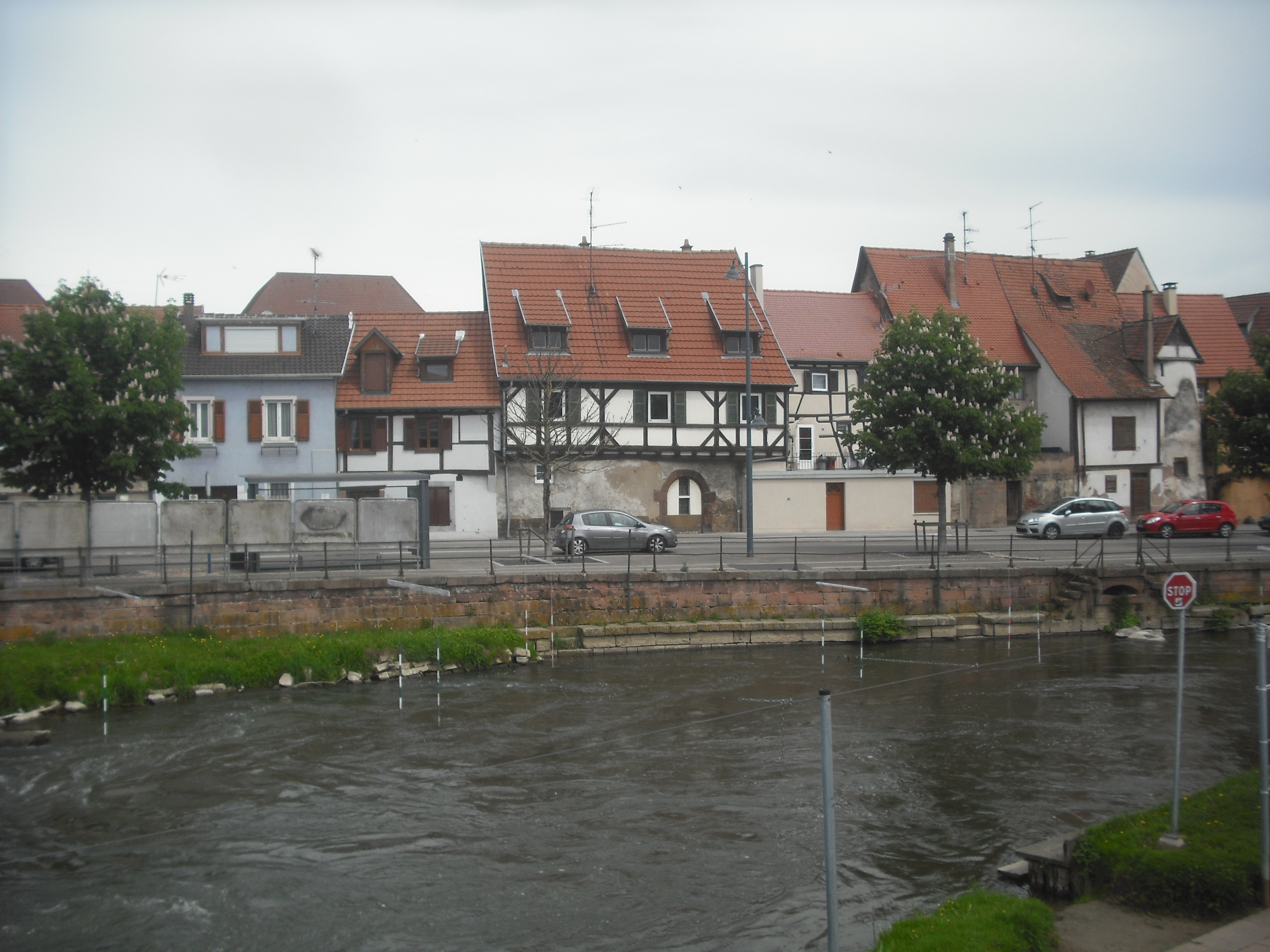
The Ill in Sélestat.

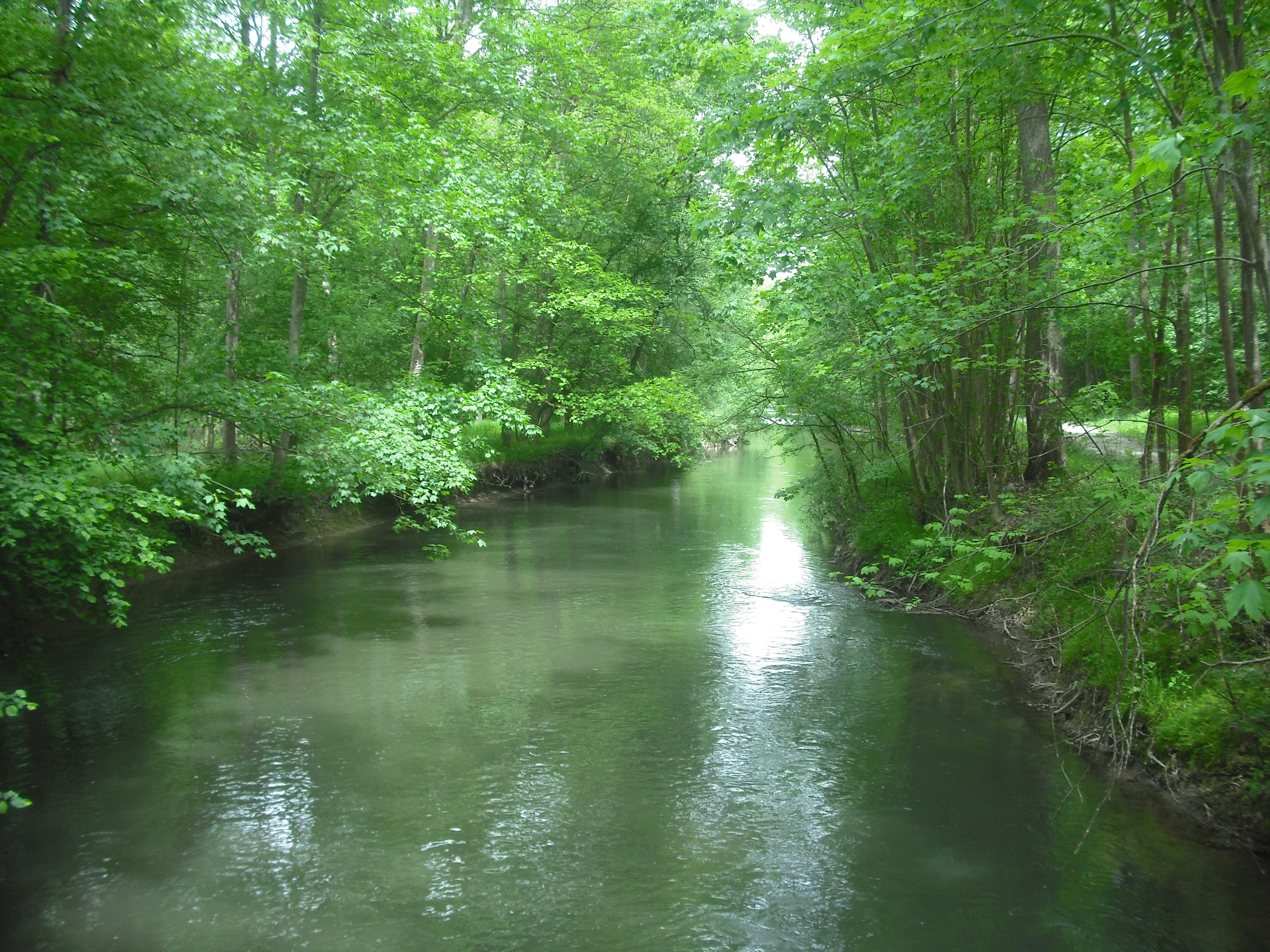
The Oberriedgraben in the Illwald.

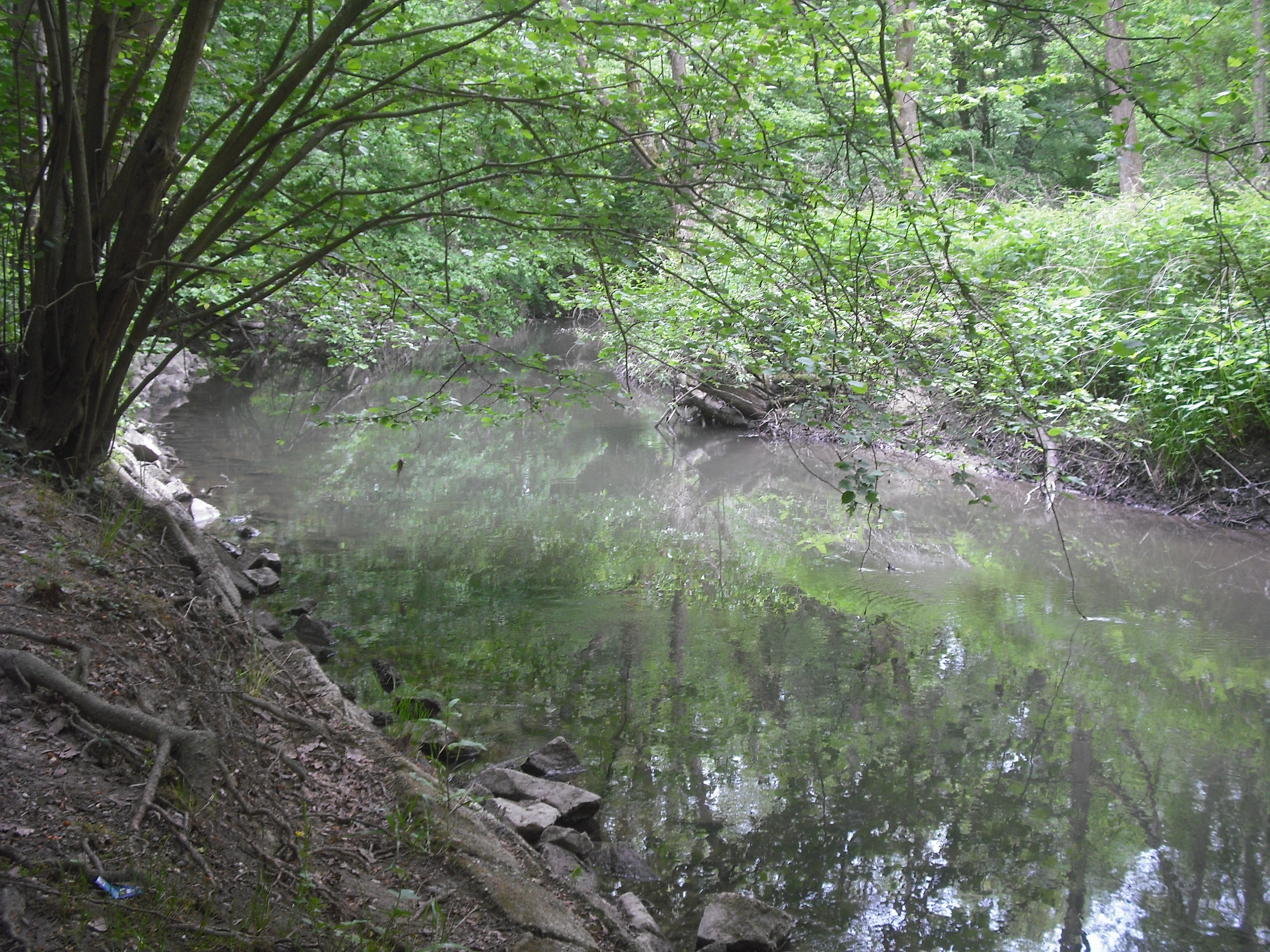
The Schiffwasser in the Illwald.

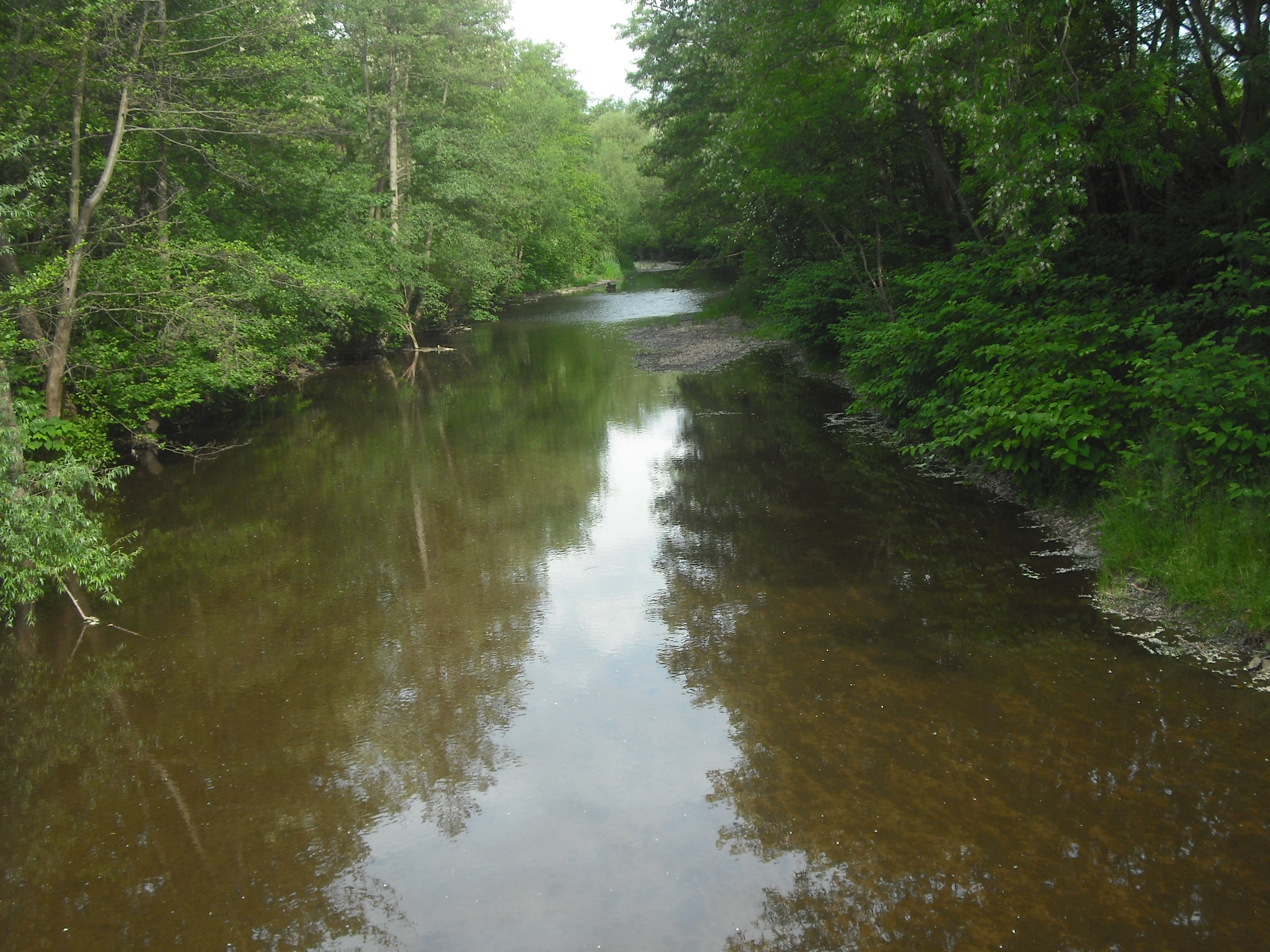
The Giessen.

== Transport ==
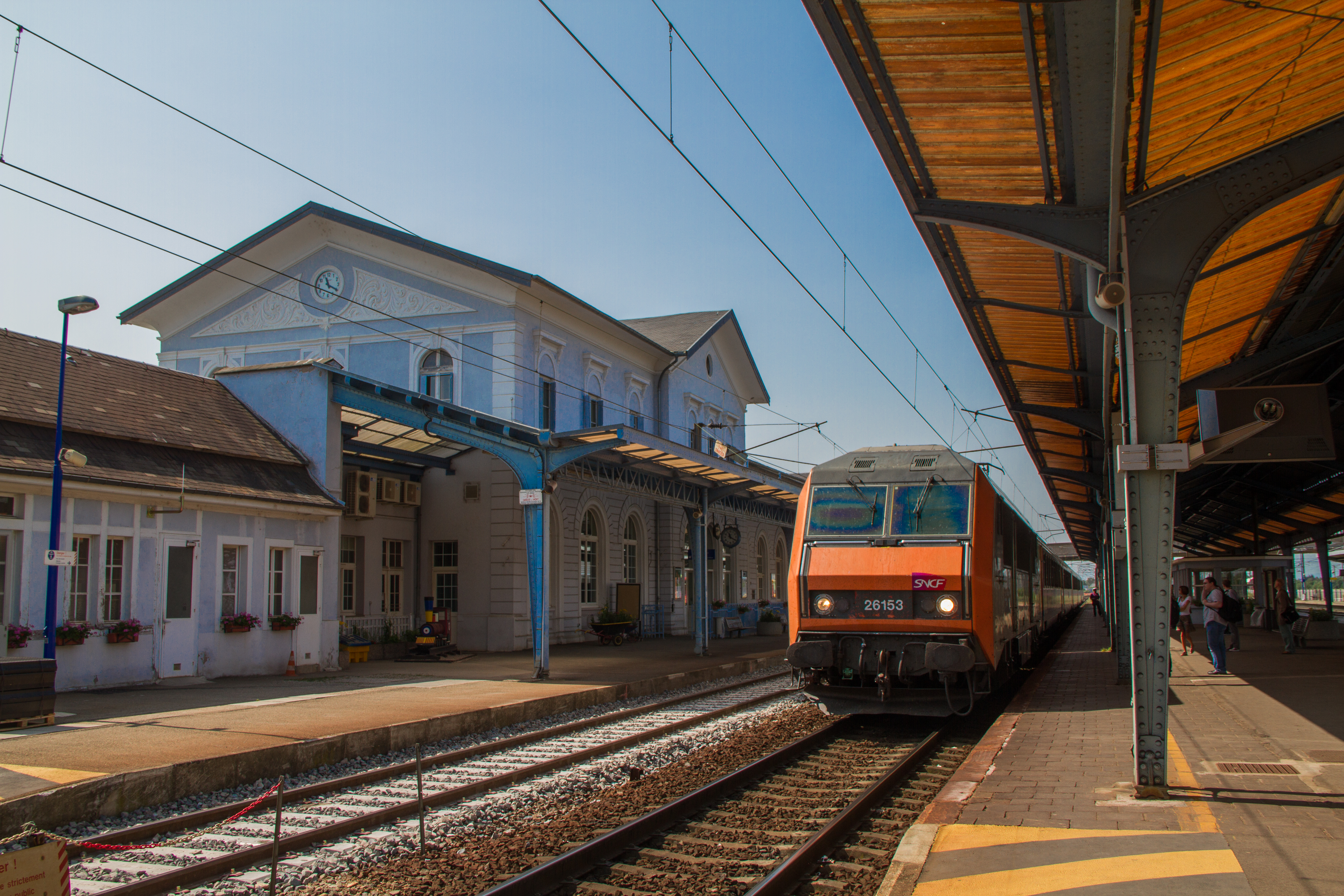
Sélestat train station.

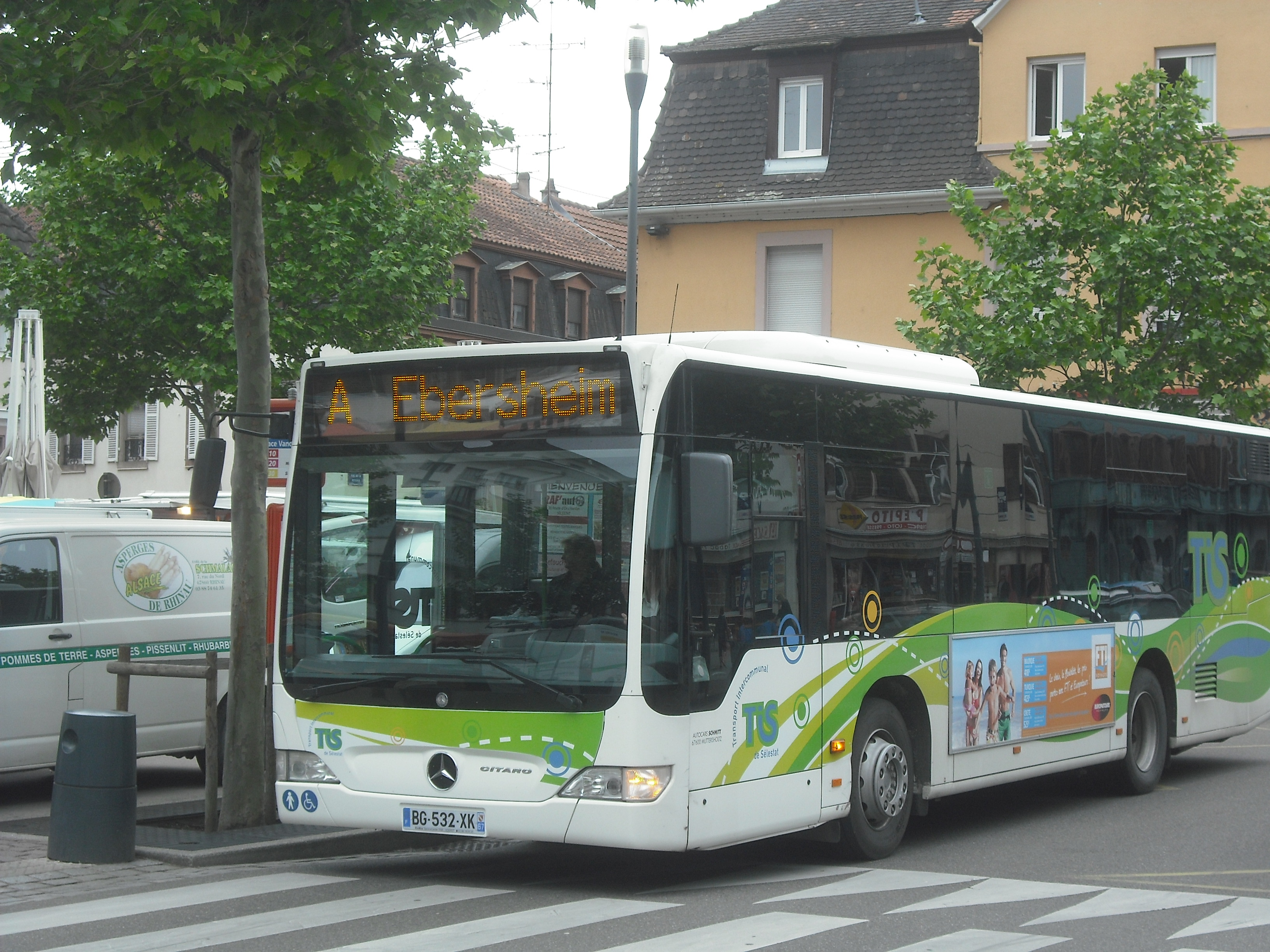
A TIS bus in Sélestat.

Despite its small size, Sélestat is well connected to transport networks. Alsace as a whole, being part of the economic heart of Europe, has a high road and railway density.

The town is served by the A35 autoroute, a motorway that crosses Alsace north to south, connecting Strasbourg, Colmar and Mulhouse. Further south it connects to the Swiss A3 motorway, and further north to the German B9 highway. Taken together, these three roads connect the Netherlands to Austria. Sélestat is also located at one of the seven crossings of the Vosges mountains, connecting Lorraine to Alsace and Germany.

Sélestat train station was opened in 1840, which makes it one of the oldest in France. It lies on the Strasbourg–Basel railway, which also serves Colmar, Mulhouse and Saint-Louis. (Note: Dorlan 2002, p. 514.) Sélestat is at the terminus of two local railways that are partly closed: Sélestat-Lesseux, now ending in Lièpvre, and Sélestat-Saverne, now ending in Molsheim. The former railway runs towards the west through the Vosges, while the latter runs towards the northwest. A third local line, Sélestat-Sundhouse, closed in 1953. Although one of the oldest in France, the Strasbourg-Basel railway allows high speed travel of (200 kilometres per hour (120 mph)) because it is very rectilinear and crosses a very flat landscape. Sélestat is served by all regional trains between Strasbourg and Basel (one train in each direction every hour on weekdays). Local trains also run between Sélestat and Molsheim, Sélestat and Strasbourg and Sélestat and Barr. Sélestat is served by a Paris-Colmar TGV every day in each direction, by Strasbourg-Nice and Strasbourg-Cerbère Intercités in the summer, and by EuroCity trains connecting Zürich to Brussels and Basel to Luxembourg.

SNCF and the Bas-Rhin council operate coach lines between Sélestat and Sainte-Marie-aux-Mines, Saint-Dié-des-Vosges, Ribeauvillé, Marckolsheim, Sundhouse and Villé. The council also arranges for seasonal connections with Haut-Kœnigsbourg castle and Europa Park.

Sélestat and its communauté de communes have their own local bus network, the "Transport intercommunal de Sélestat" (TIS). It comprises two lines, one connecting Châtenois to Ebersheim, and the other Scherwiller to Muttersholtz. These two lines make several stops in Sélestat proper, which is at the centre of the network.

== Demography ==
Historical population

| Year | Pop. | ±% p.a. |
|---|---|---|
| 1793 | 6,907 | — |
| 1800 | 7,464 | +1.11% |
| 1806 | 8,068 | +1.31% |
| 1821 | 9,070 | +0.78% |
| 1831 | 9,646 | +0.62% |
| 1836 | 9,700 | +0.11% |
| 1841 | 8,634 | −2.30% |
| 1846 | 9,844 | +2.66% |
| 1851 | 10,365 | +1.04% |
| 1856 | 9,950 | −0.81% |
| 1861 | 10,184 | +0.47% |
| 1866 | 10,040 | −0.28% |
| 1871 | 9,307 | −1.50% |

| Year | Pop. | ±% p.a. |
|---|---|---|
| 1875 | 9,088 | −0.59% |
| 1880 | 8,979 | −0.24% |
| 1885 | 9,172 | +0.43% |
| 1890 | 9,418 | +0.53% |
| 1895 | 9,304 | −0.24% |
| 1900 | 9,336 | +0.07% |
| 1905 | 9,699 | +0.77% |
| 1910 | 10,604 | +1.80% |
| 1921 | 9,943 | −0.58% |
| 1926 | 10,165 | +0.44% |
| 1931 | 10,959 | +1.52% |
| 1936 | 11,363 | +0.73% |
| 1946 | 10,722 | −0.58% |

| Year | Pop. | ±% p.a. |
|---|---|---|
| 1954 | 11,705 | +1.10% |
| 1962 | 13,818 | +2.10% |
| 1968 | 14,635 | +0.96% |
| 1975 | 15,248 | +0.59% |
| 1982 | 15,112 | −0.13% |
| 1990 | 15,538 | +0.35% |
| 1999 | 17,179 | +1.12% |
| 2007 | 19,303 | +1.47% |
| 2012 | 19,397 | +0.10% |
| 2017 | 19,252 | −0.15% |
| 2023 | 19,589 | +0.29% |

Sources: Base Cassini from EHESS for figures until 1962, and INSEE for figures since 1968

Sélestat is the 9th most populated commune in Alsace. The oldest preserved birth registries of the town's Catholic parish go back to the year 1608; the oldest vital records (état civil) go back to the year 1793.

Sélestat was one of the largest towns in the region from the Middle Ages until the beginning of the 19th century. In 1801, it was still the third most populous in Alsace behind Strasbourg and Colmar. It then had 7,375 inhabitants, a slightly higher figure than for Mulhouse (7,197) and Haguenau (7,009). Through the 19th century, Sélestat did not take advantage of industrialisation and rural exodus because its city wall and military function prevented urban growth. It reached its overpopulation threshold around 1830, with around 10,000 inhabitants living on only 32 hectares (79 acres). (Note: Encyclopédie de l'Alsace 1985, p. 6829.) Only after the Second World War did Sélestat experience significant demographic growth, almost doubling its population in 50 years. However, this growth was not strong enough for Sélestat to recover its previous rank.

The demographic growth that occurred in Sélestat after 1945 was primarily due to a relatively high birth rate (20.1‰ in Sélestat over the period 1968–1975, compared to 16.9‰ in France). After 1975, this rate progressively declined to match the national figure. Net migration figures remained slightly negative until 1990 because Sélestat and Central Alsace were on the margins of the metropolitan areas of Strasbourg and Colmar and lacked attractivity. Since 1990, the Strasbourg area greatly expanded to gradually reach Sélestat. The town has thus become more attractive to newcomers.

The population of Sélestat is relatively young, 36.2% of the population were under 30 in 2017 (France: 35.7%) and the percentage of people over 60 years old (23.6%) was lower than the national (25.5%) figure. Sélestat has a significant proportion of people between 15 and 44 (39.7%, compared to 36.4% for all of France) because it attracts a large number of young actives and couples starting a family. As other towns in the region, such as Saverne, Haguenau and Molsheim, it welcomes young adults and encourages them to settle in the surrounding villages.

== Economy ==
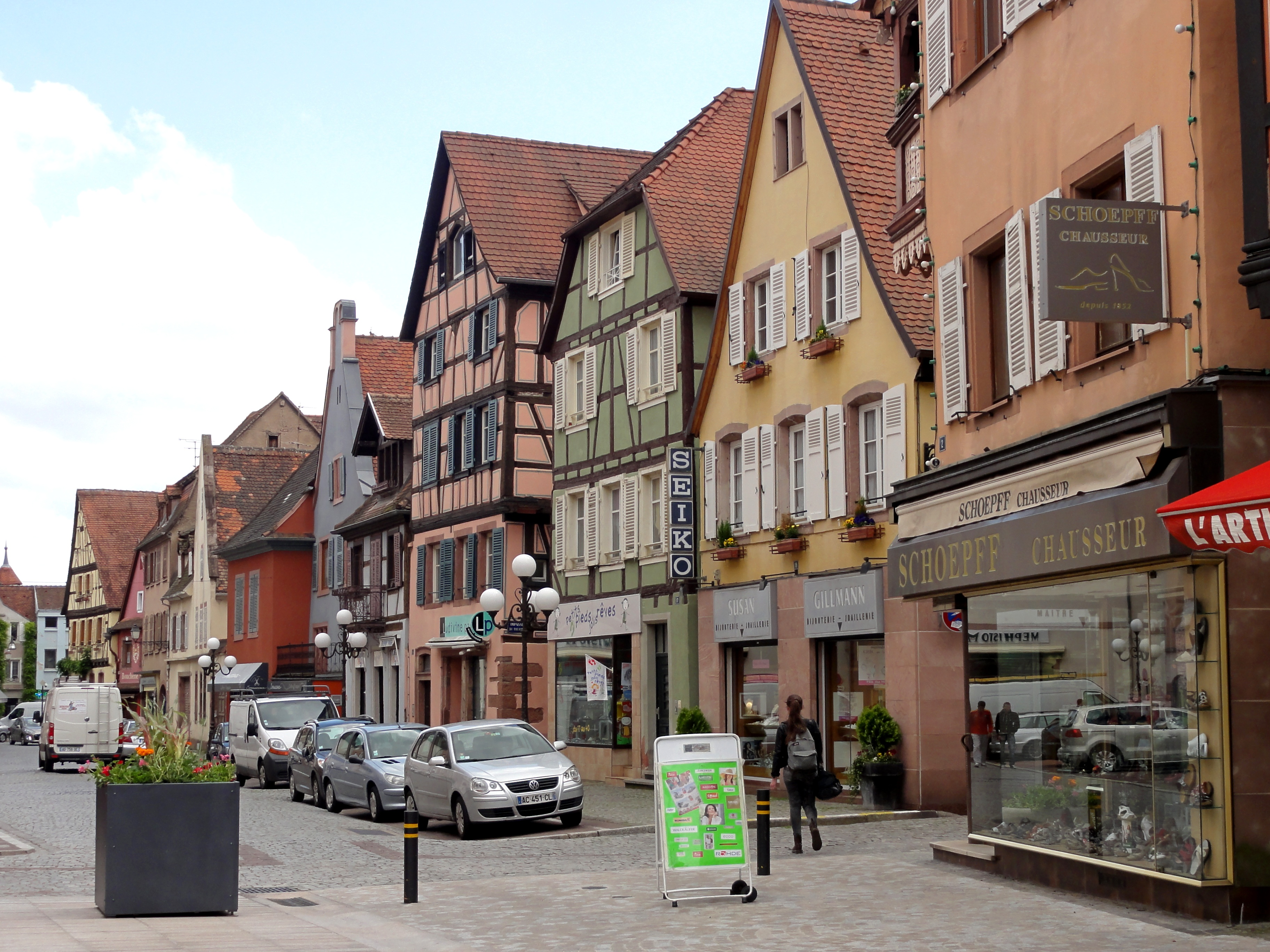
Small shops in the old town.

At the end of 2015, Sélestat had 2,142 businesses, most of them (1,441) in the tertiary sector. A large share were small businesses; only 9% had more than 10 employees. Sélestat is a retail and services centre for the whole Central Alsace, with a large shopping park and administrative and educational institutions. (Note: Encyclopédie de l'Alsace 1985, p. 6830.) Industry is nonetheless represented by some large firms, such as the Société alsacienne de meubles, which builds kitchens and bathrooms under a Schmidt and Cuisinella franchise, Amcor (aluminium packaging), Daramic (battery separators), Albany (gauzes for the printing industry), Wanzl (warehouse material), and DHJ (textiles).

Most of the large factories are in an industrial estate located south of the town centre. Created in the 1930s, it covers a site of 67 hectares (166 acres). (Note: Encyclopédie de l'Alsace 1985, p. 6839.) The newer commercial estate north of the town was developed in the 1970s and is dedicated to retail and cottage industry. It covers 134 hectares (331 acres). The town centre is also an important shopping area with more than 200 businesses.

== Sights and culture ==
In terms of architecture the city has the third largest cultural heritage after Strasbourg and Colmar. Sélestat has 35 listed buildings and 119 additional sites that are indexed in the French list of cultural heritage monuments.

=== Museums ===
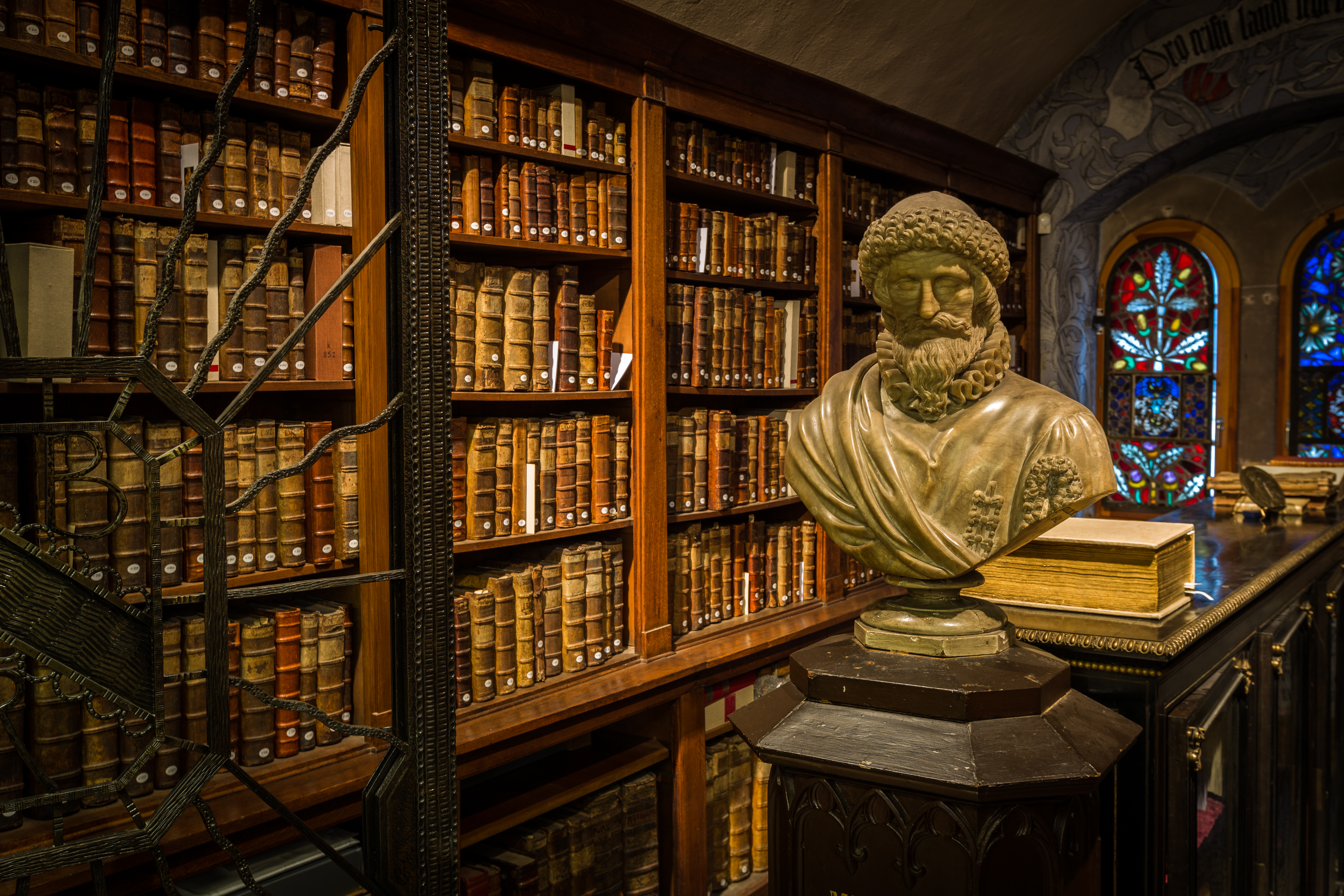
The Humanist Library of Sélestat.

The Humanist Library displays one of the oldest and most homogeneous collections of medieval manuscripts and Renaissance books in Europe. Its core is the still almost intact library of Beatus Rhenanus, which was bequeathed to the city and has been maintained by it ever since. The institution also holds the books that belonged to the Latin school of Sélestat, at which Rhenanus and many other reformers were educated around 1500. In 2011, the library was inscribed by UNESCO in its Memory of the World international register.

The library is open to both researchers and tourists, with an exhibition displaying some of its most noteworthy items: an 8th-century lectionary, the first books printed in Alsace, a copy of the Cosmographiae Introductio where the oldest mention of America can be found, and a 1521 document which contains the oldest record of a Christmas tree.

Sélestat also has a museum dedicated to bread and baking and it is the seat of the FRAC d'Alsace, a regional institution whose aim is to collect contemporary works of art (see below, Cultural institutions and events). These works are regularly part of temporary exhibits in Sélestat and other places in Alsace. FRAC possesses works by Aurélie Nemours, Olivier Debré, Mario Merz and Panamarenko, among other artists.

=== Religious architecture ===
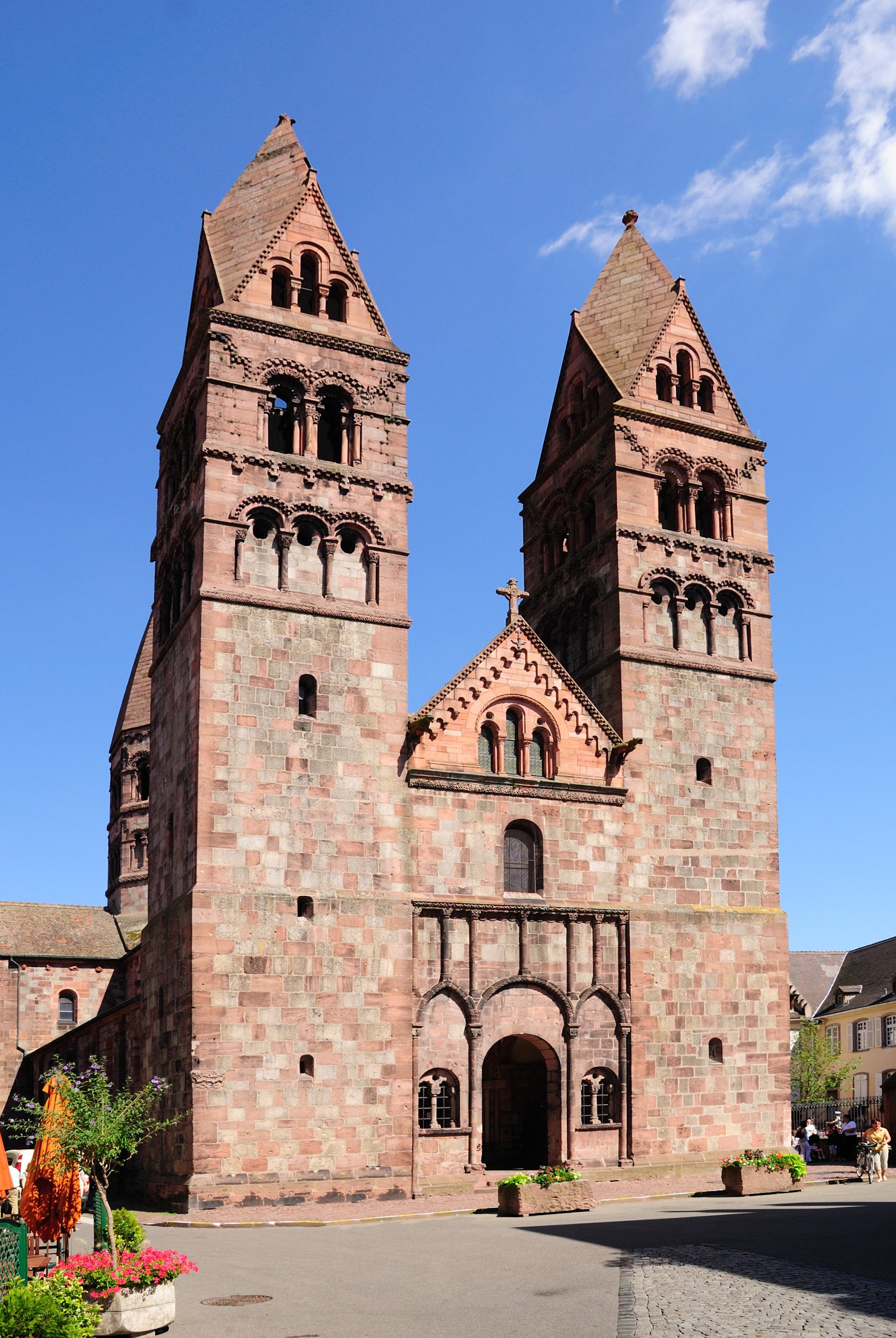
St Faith's Church.

Sélestat has two large and remarkable churches from the Middle Ages. St. Faith's Church is the oldest and a prime example of Romanesque architecture. Its design is related to similar buildings both in the Rhine region and in Lorraine. It was built during the second half of the 12th century to replace an earlier building. (Note: Encyclopédie de l'Alsace 1985, p. 6845.) The church was renovated in the 19th century and a medieval death mask was found during this work. It is often attributed to Hildegard of Eguisheim, founder of the church, and is now displayed in a crypt.

St. George's Church has always served as the main parish church. It is often referred to as "the cathedral" because of its size, but it has never been the seat of a diocese. Its construction started soon after 1200 and was completed at the beginning of the 15th century. Its design is pure Gothic, save for a Romanesque side portal. The choir, the last part to be completed, is the most remarkable element. It is illuminated by 288 stained glass panels, of which 55 date from the 15th century.

Most of the convents of the town have disappeared; the Dominican convent is the only one to have retained much of its original appearance. It was built in the 13th century and still has its church and cloister. (Note: Encyclopédie de l'Alsace 1985, p. 6843.) The Franciscan convent was completely destroyed, apart from the choir of its church, which now serves as a Protestant church. (Note: Almira & Billoin 2000, p. 100.) Sélestat also has an old granary that belonged to the Benedictine priory, and a 16th-century commandery built by the Knights Hospitaller.

The synagogue was built in 1890. Its architecture is typical of the region, with a square shape and discreet neo-romanesque ornaments. Its cupola was destroyed in 1940 by the Nazis and never rebuilt. The Jewish cemetery, located outside the old town, was opened in 1622. It has several 18th-century gravestones showing a Christian artistic influence. (Note: Almira & Billoin 2000, p. 112.)

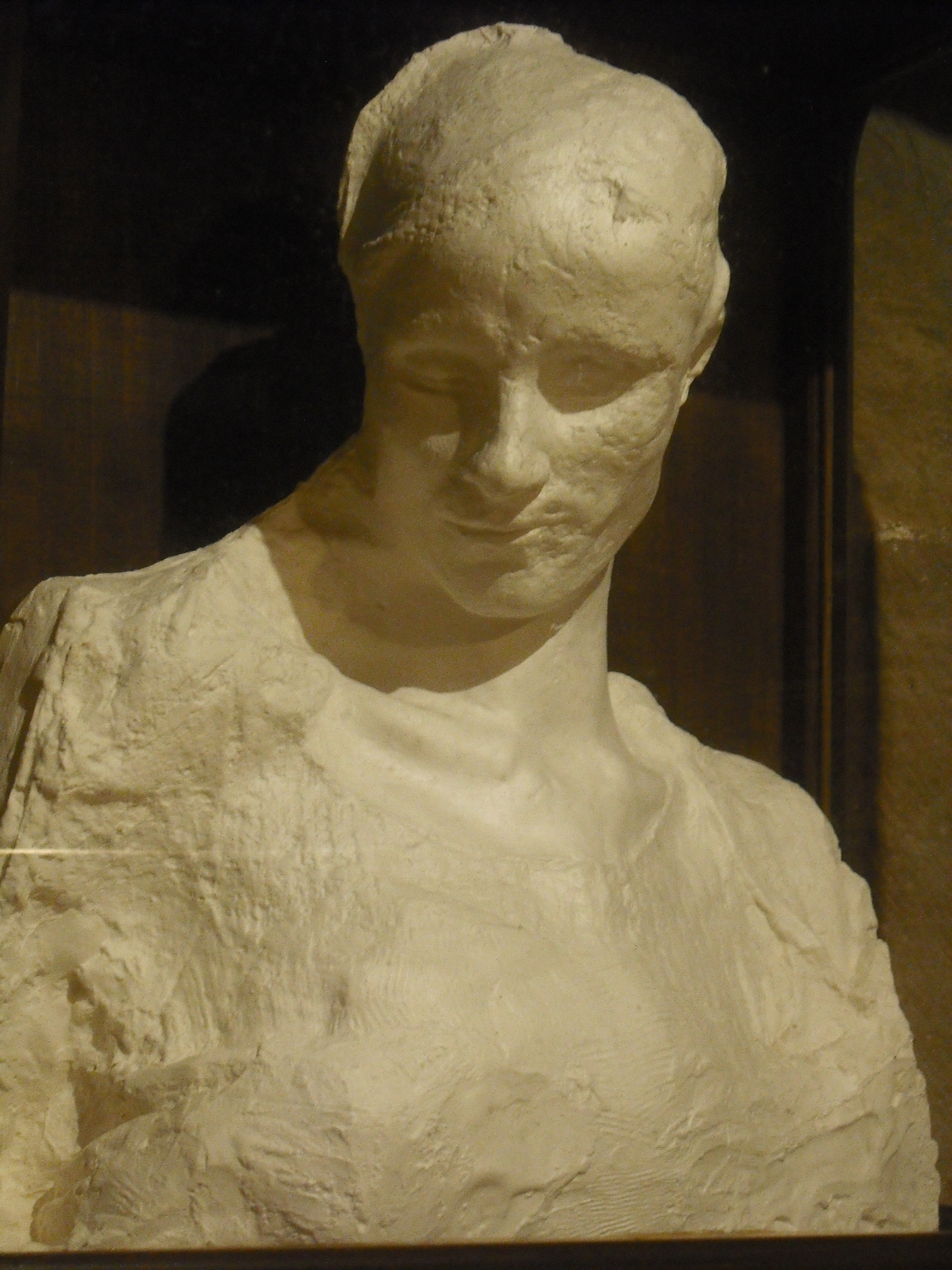
The death mask in St. Faith's.

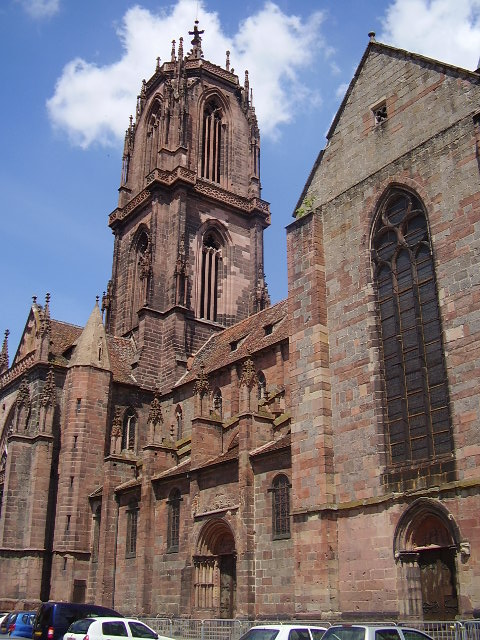
St. George's Church.

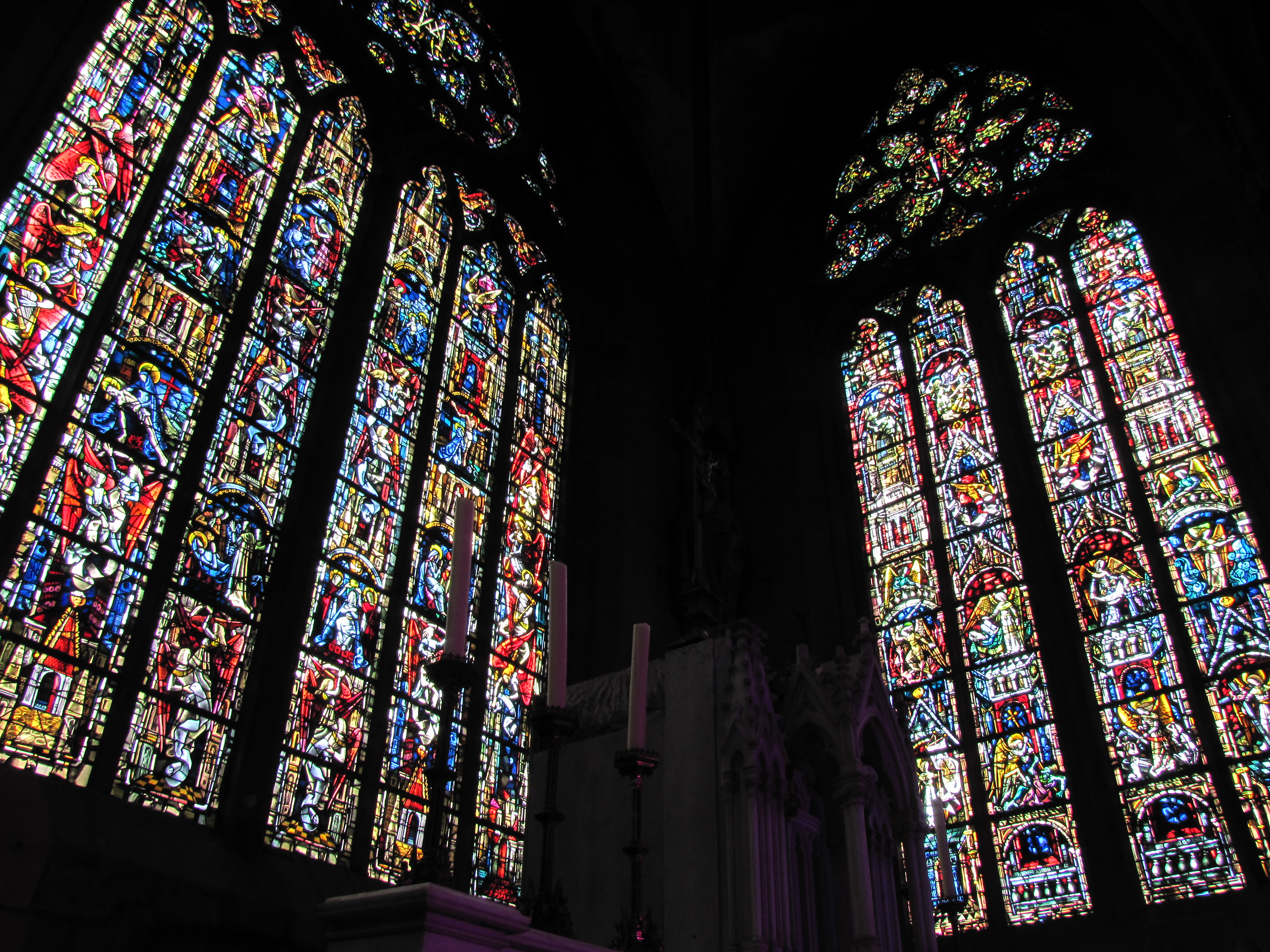
Stained-glass windows in St. George's.

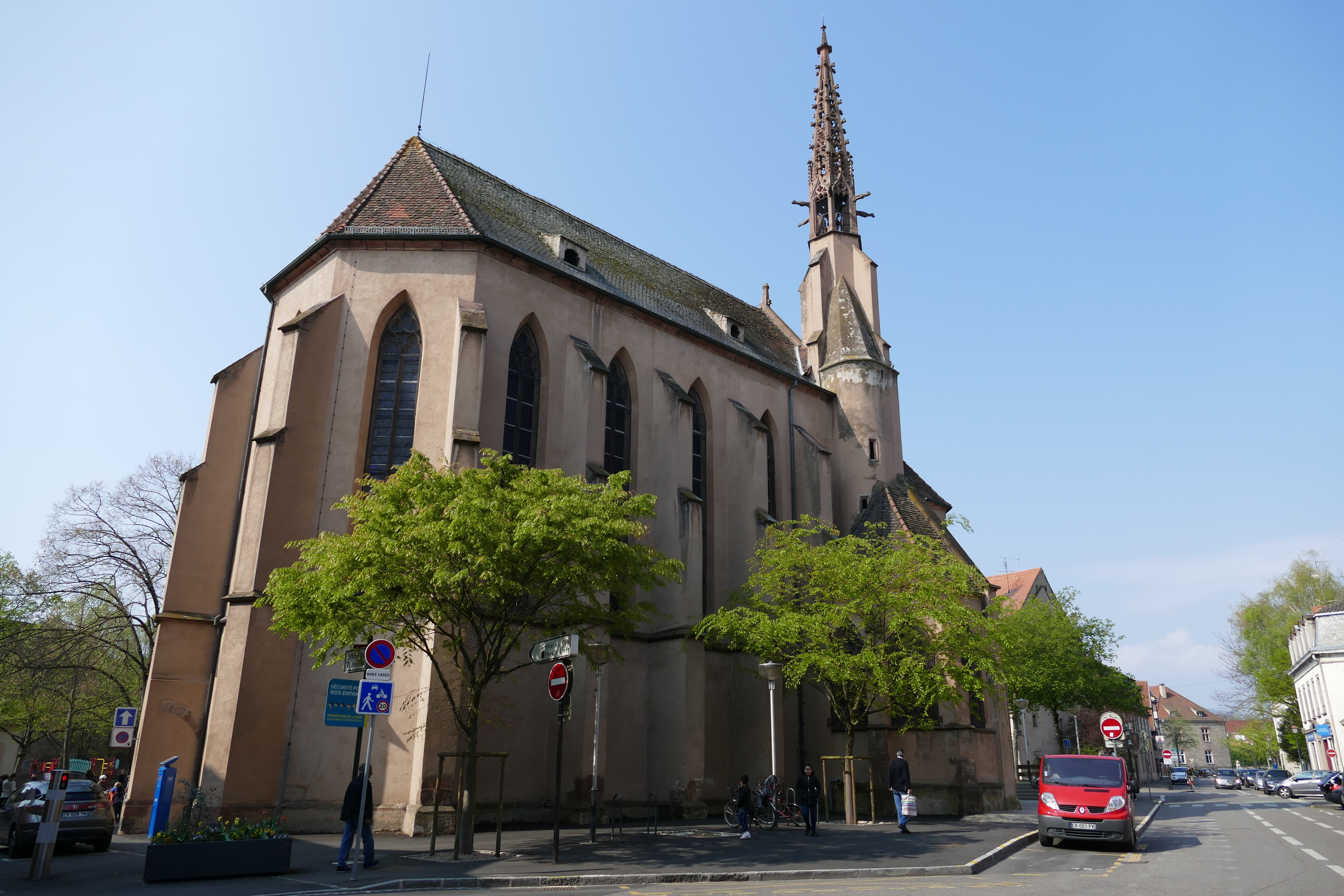
The Protestant church.

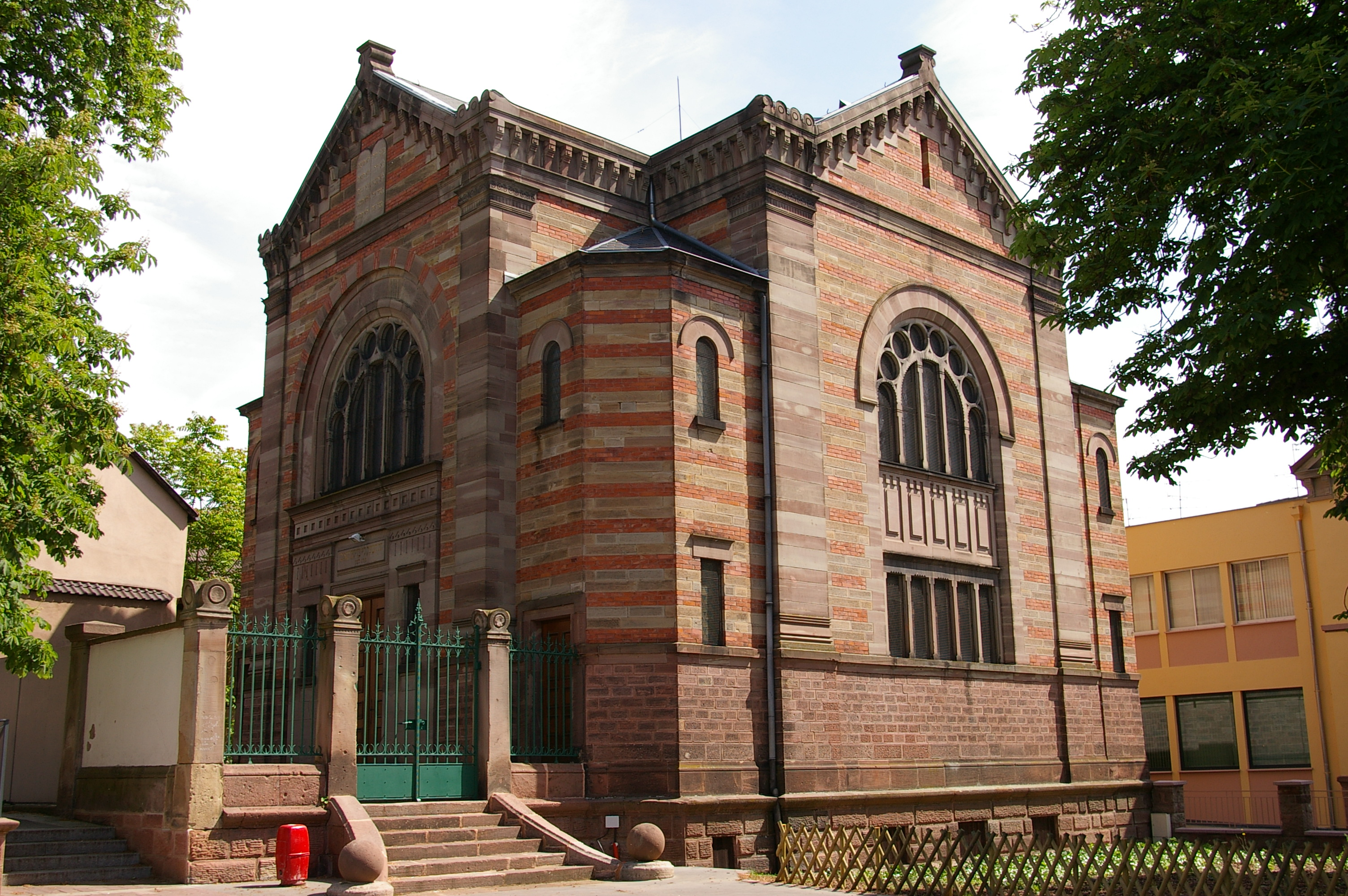
The synagogue.

=== Civil and military architecture ===
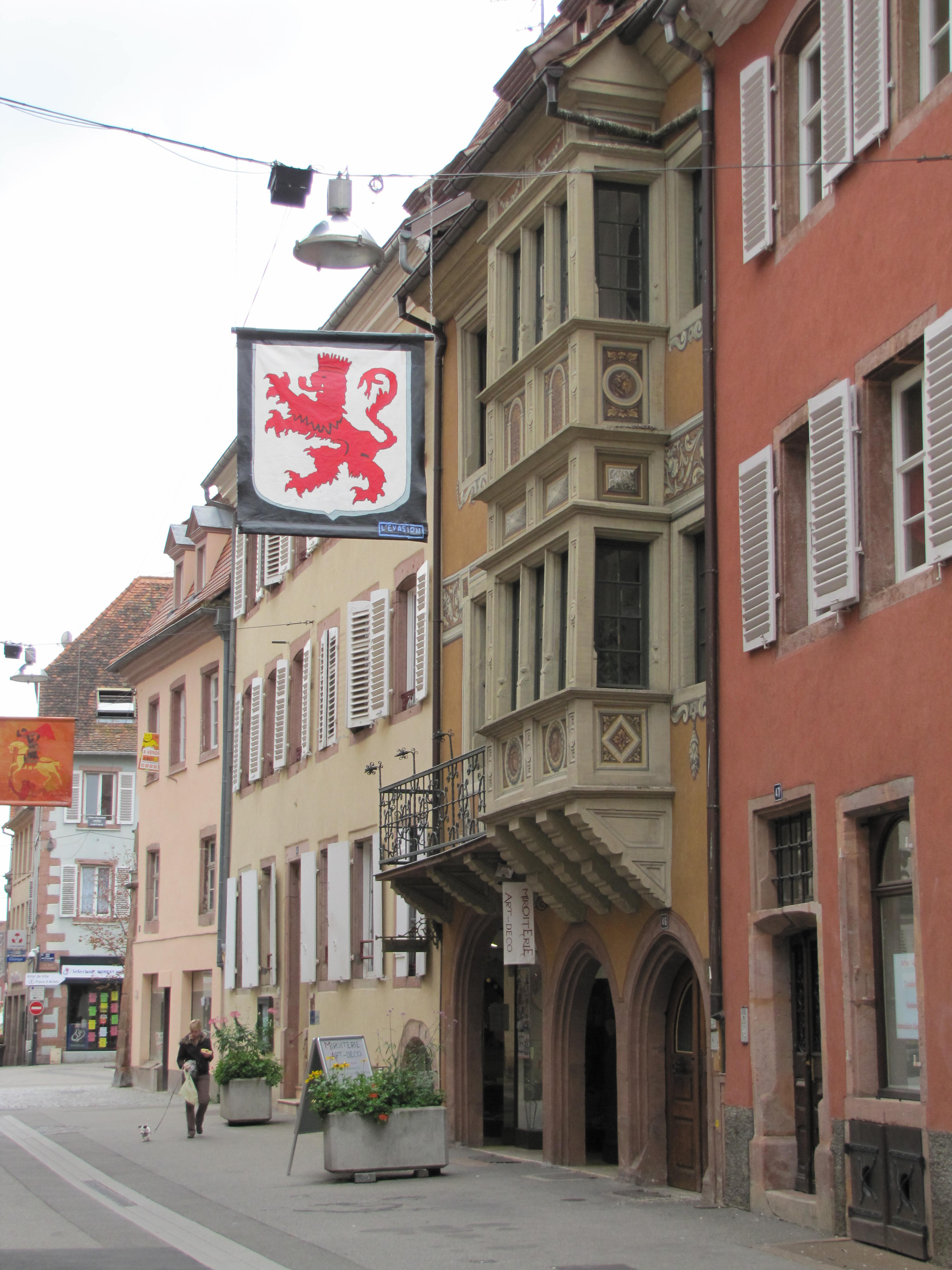
Rue des Chevaliers.

The old town comprises a large number of medieval and Renaissance buildings. The quai des Tanneurs ("tanners' quay") is one of the most picturesque streets in Alsace. A stream used to flow in the middle of the street until the beginning of the 20th century, the relic of a former noxious-smelling trade, since tanning required large amounts of flowing water for treating and washing animal skins. Most of the old tanner houses date back to the Middle Ages and have a tall attic to provide a ventilated space for drying leather. In the neighbouring streets, rue des Oies ("geese street") and rue des Veaux ("calf street"), many houses were covered with a coat of plaster in the 19th century to hide the timbering, which was considered too rustic.

Several hôtels particuliers (large townhouses) date from the Renaissance. Most of them have oriel windows that are characteristic of German Renaissance architecture. The grandest of these hôtels belonged to the Ebersmunster abbey and it has a large three-story granary. The Ziegler house has a beautiful oriel that shows the interest of the elite of that time in Antiquity. The oriel partly reflects Vitruvius's architectural legacy and displays the portraits of four key figures of Antiquity. Baroque architecture is visible on some later hôtels dating from the 17th and 18th century. French classical architecture and its main feature, the mansard roof, were largely employed in the 18th century. To reduce costs, buildings were still built with timber framing, but as this technique was considered too Germanic and rustic, they were often covered with a rendering imitating stone. (Note: Almira & Billoin 2000, p. 103.)

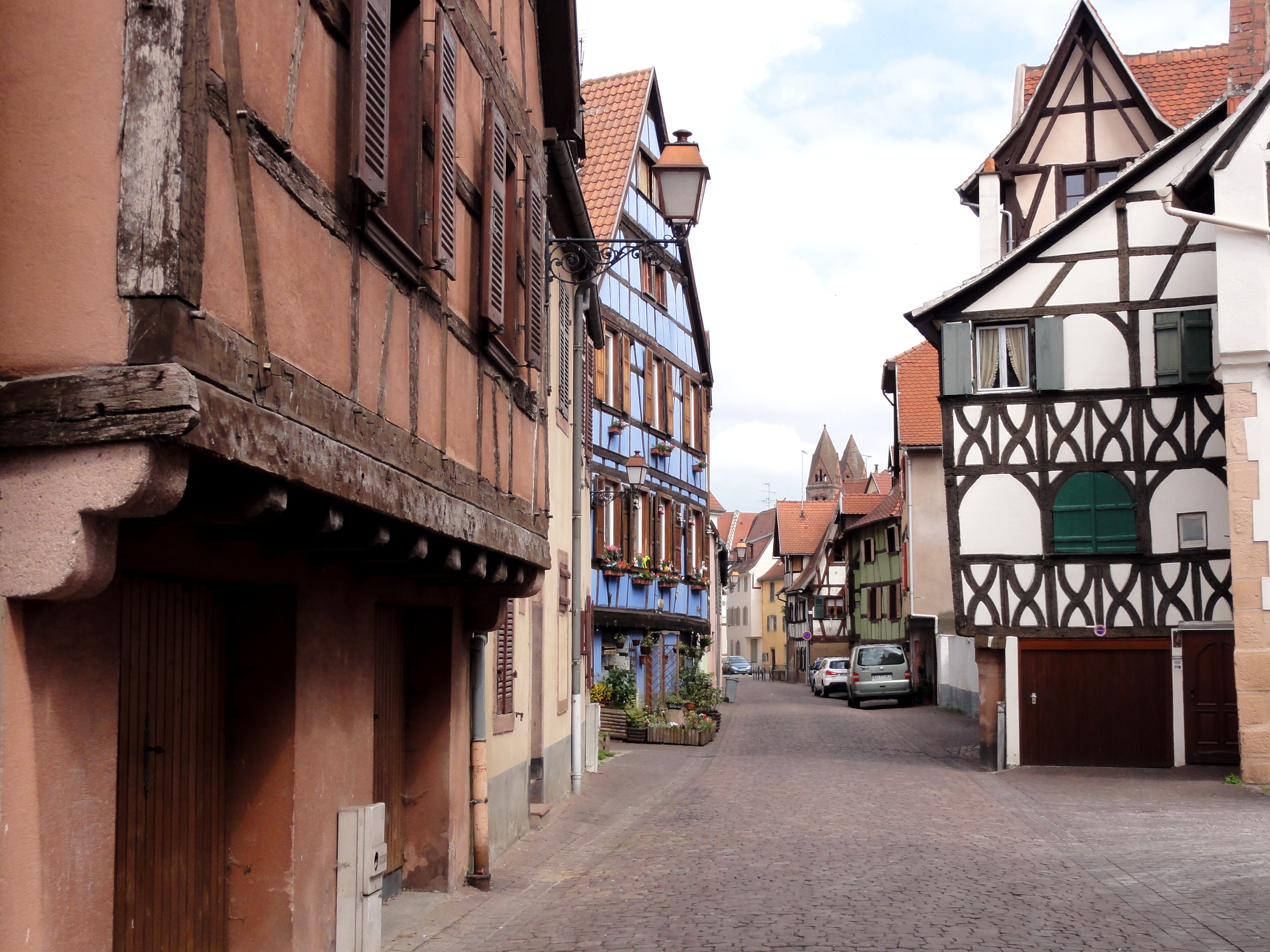
Quai des Tanneurs.

The German period (1871–1918) left some examples of Wilhelminism in the city's architecture. This prestige-oriented style is a mixture of various earlier styles, including Romanesque, Gothic and neoclassical. Noteworthy are the post office (1884), (Note: Almira & Billoin 2000, p. 107.) the courthouse (1900), (Note: Almira & Billoin 2000, p. 111.) the lycée Koeberlé (1913) and the water tower (1906). The latter (height: 50 m (160 ft)) was largely inspired by the water tower in Deventer, Netherlands.

The medieval city walls, built in several stages between the 13th and the 16th century, were torn down after the French annexation in the 17th century. However, four towers escaped destruction. The Tour des Sorcières ("witches' tower"), which served as a gate and a jail, is the tallest. The Tour de l'Horloge ("clock tower") was also originally part of a gate. The clock and the elaborate roof were added in 1614. Two much smaller towers can also be seen, one near the Ill river and another integrated into a later house. All these remains date from the 13th century.

New walls were built by Tarade and Vauban in the 17th century. They were in their turn destroyed in 1874. Only small portions survive: two bastions and the Porte de Strasbourg ("Strasbourg gate"), a good example of French architecture under Louis XIV. Sélestat still has two old arsenals, Sainte-Barbe on the main square (1470) and Saint-Hilaire (1518). The first, with a large crenelated gable, is a fine example of Gothic architecture.

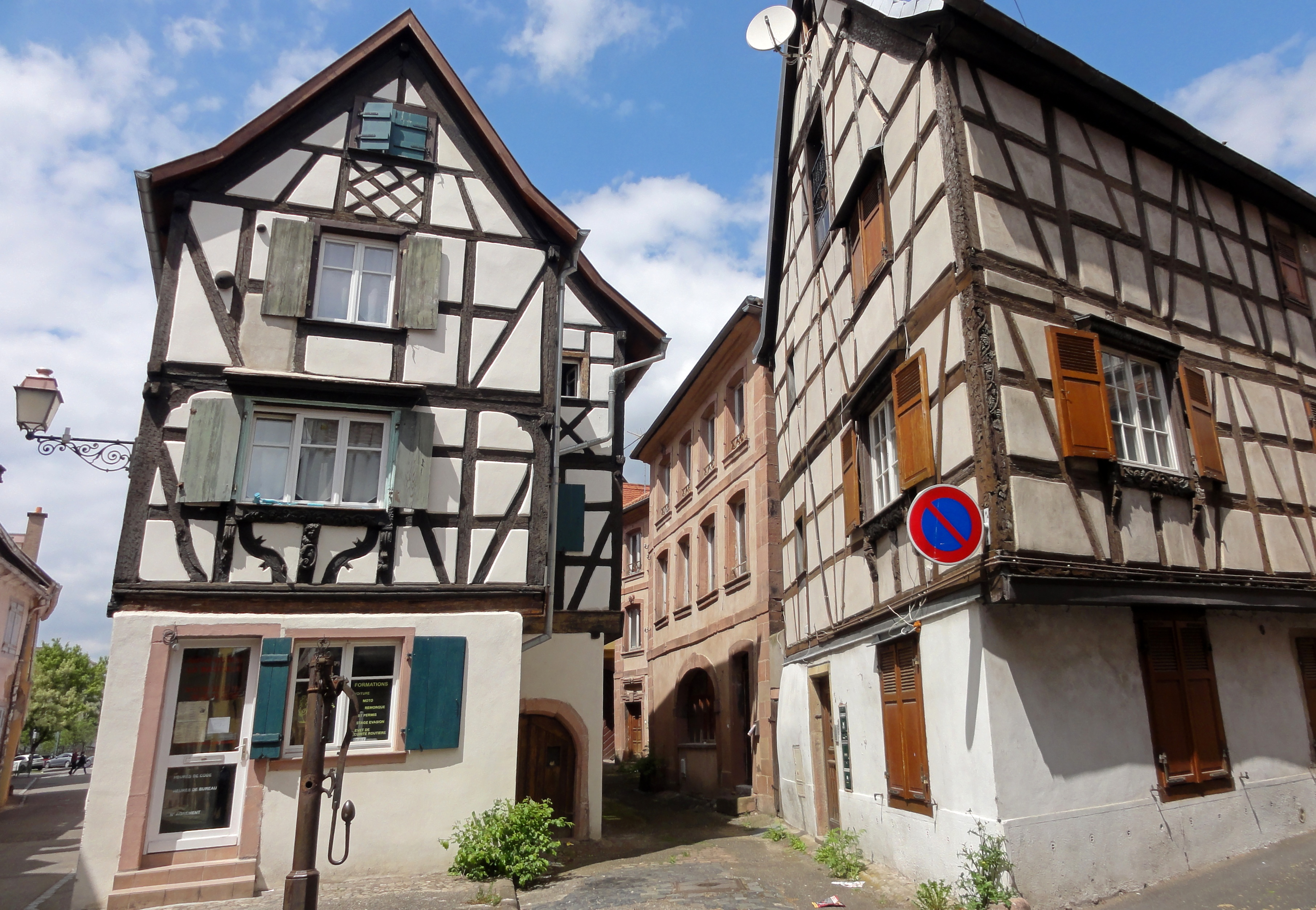
Rue Koeberlé.

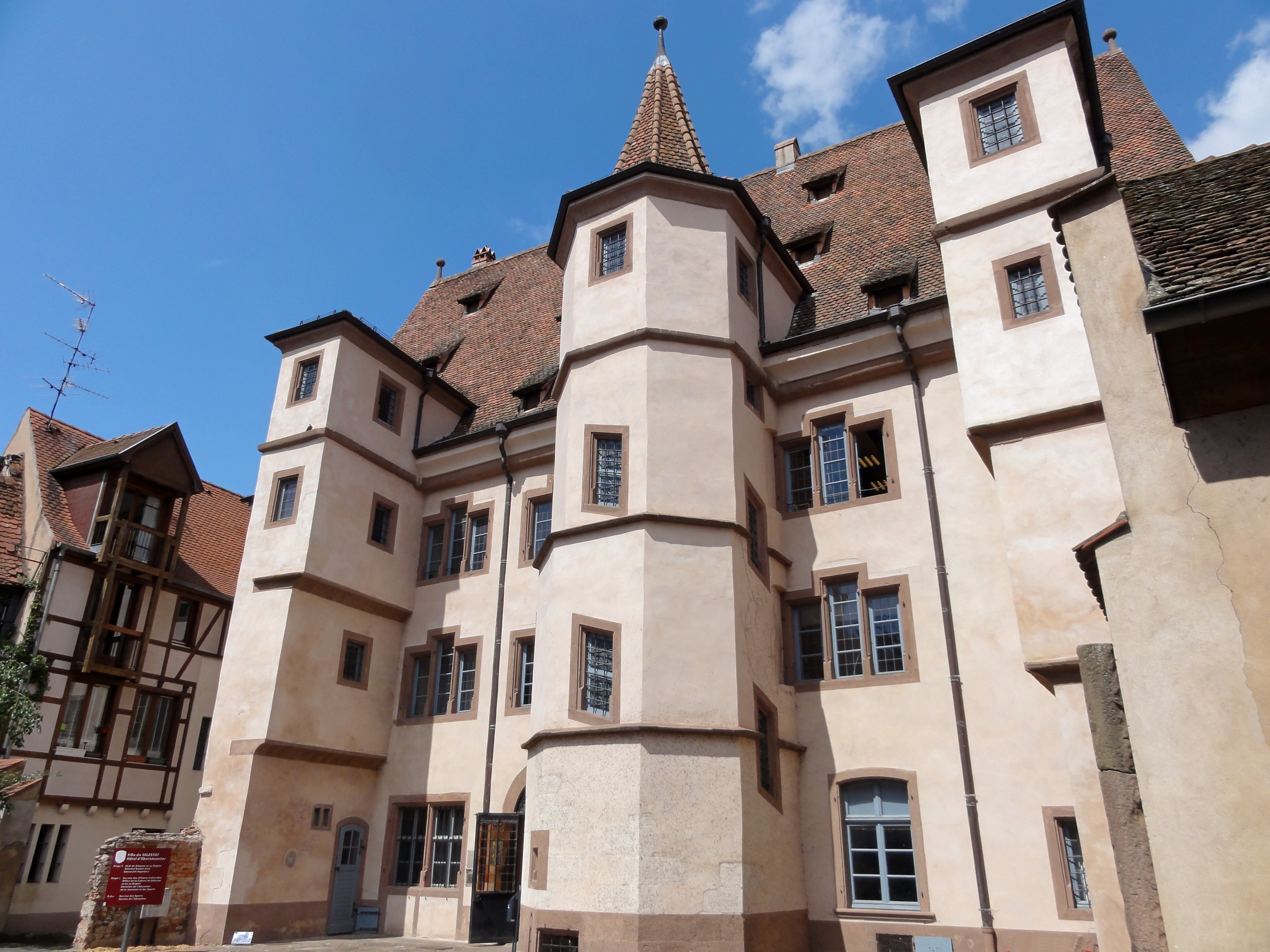
Hôtel d'Ebersmunster.

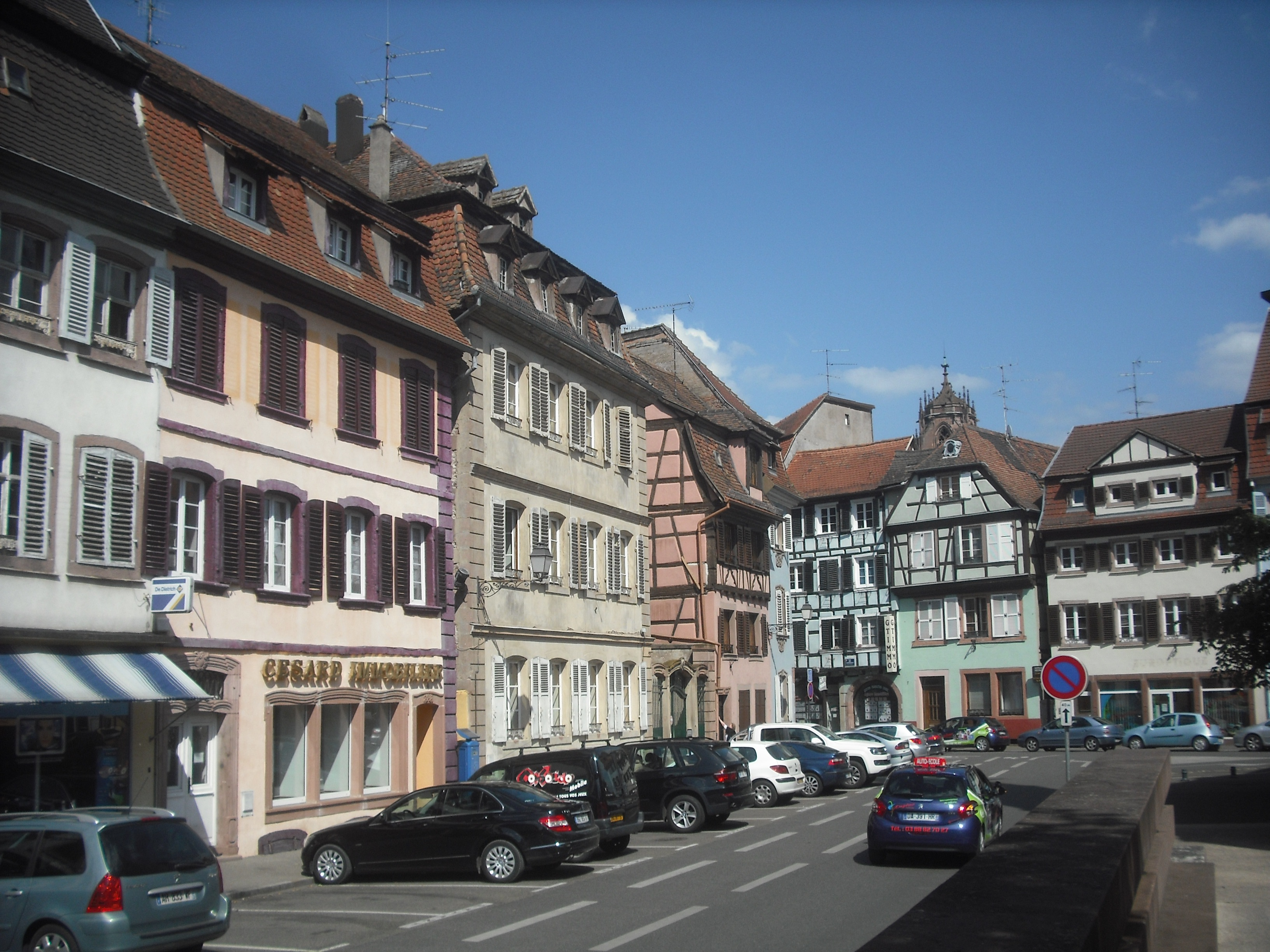
One of the many squares.

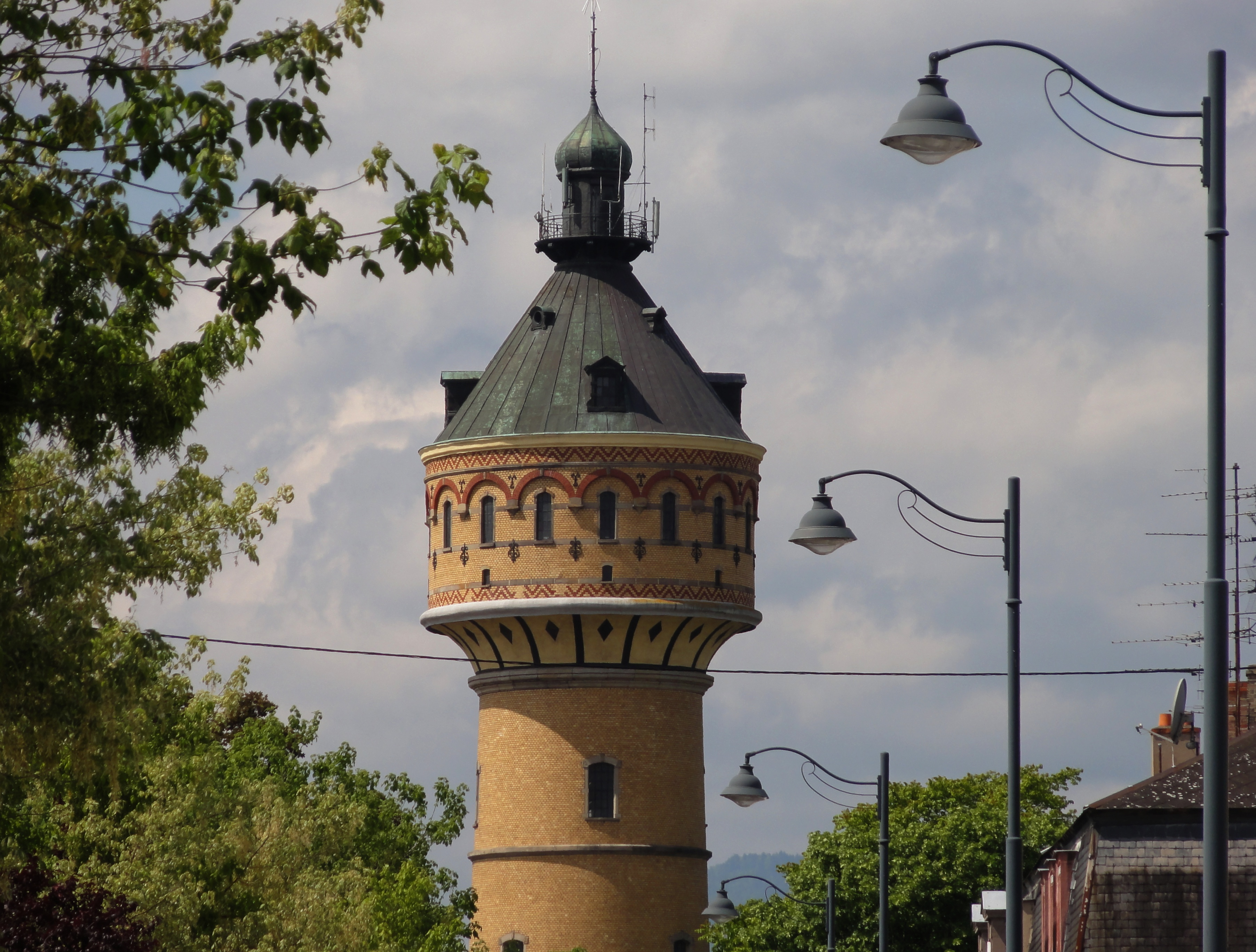
The water tower.

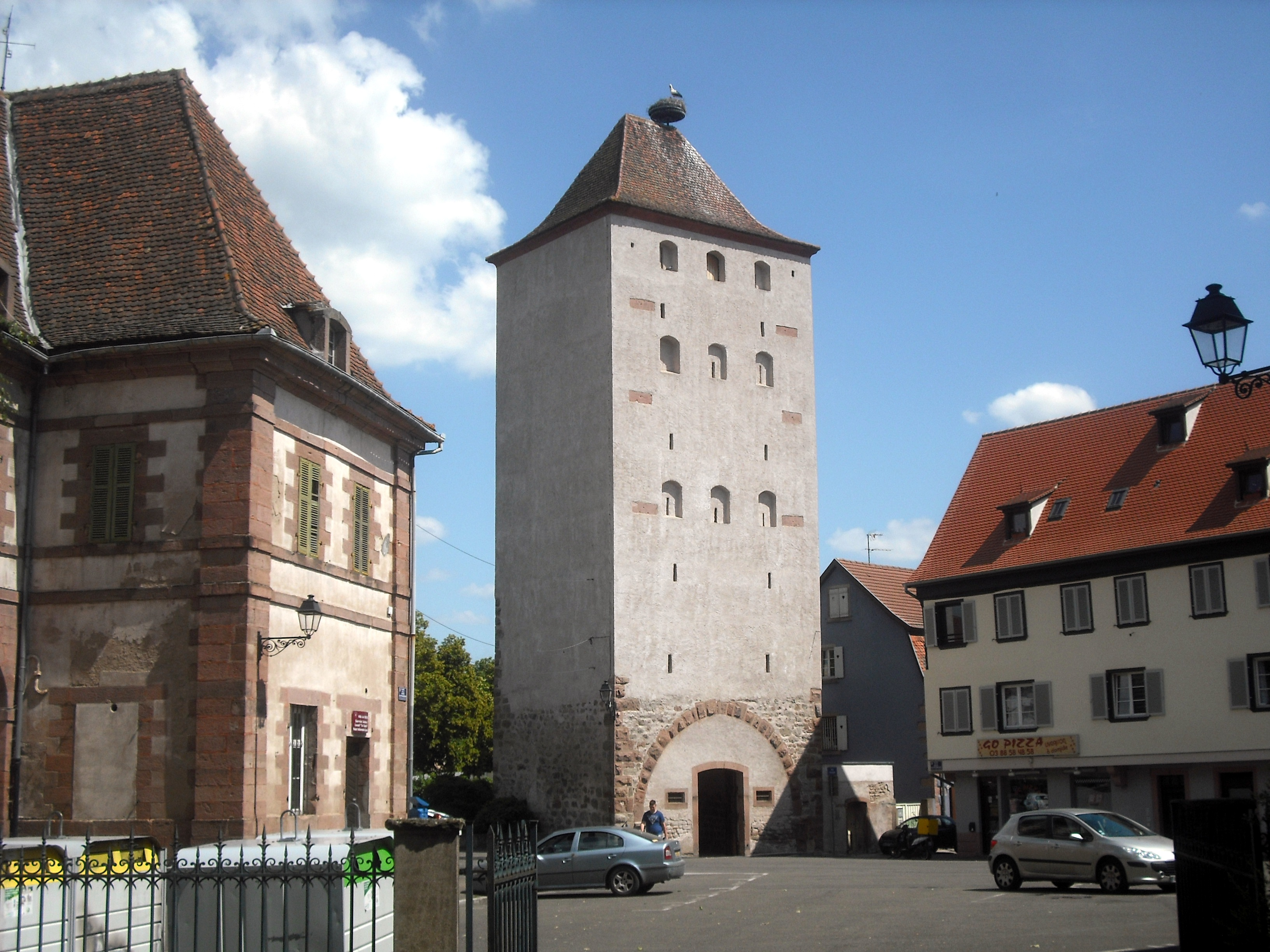
Tour des Sorcières.

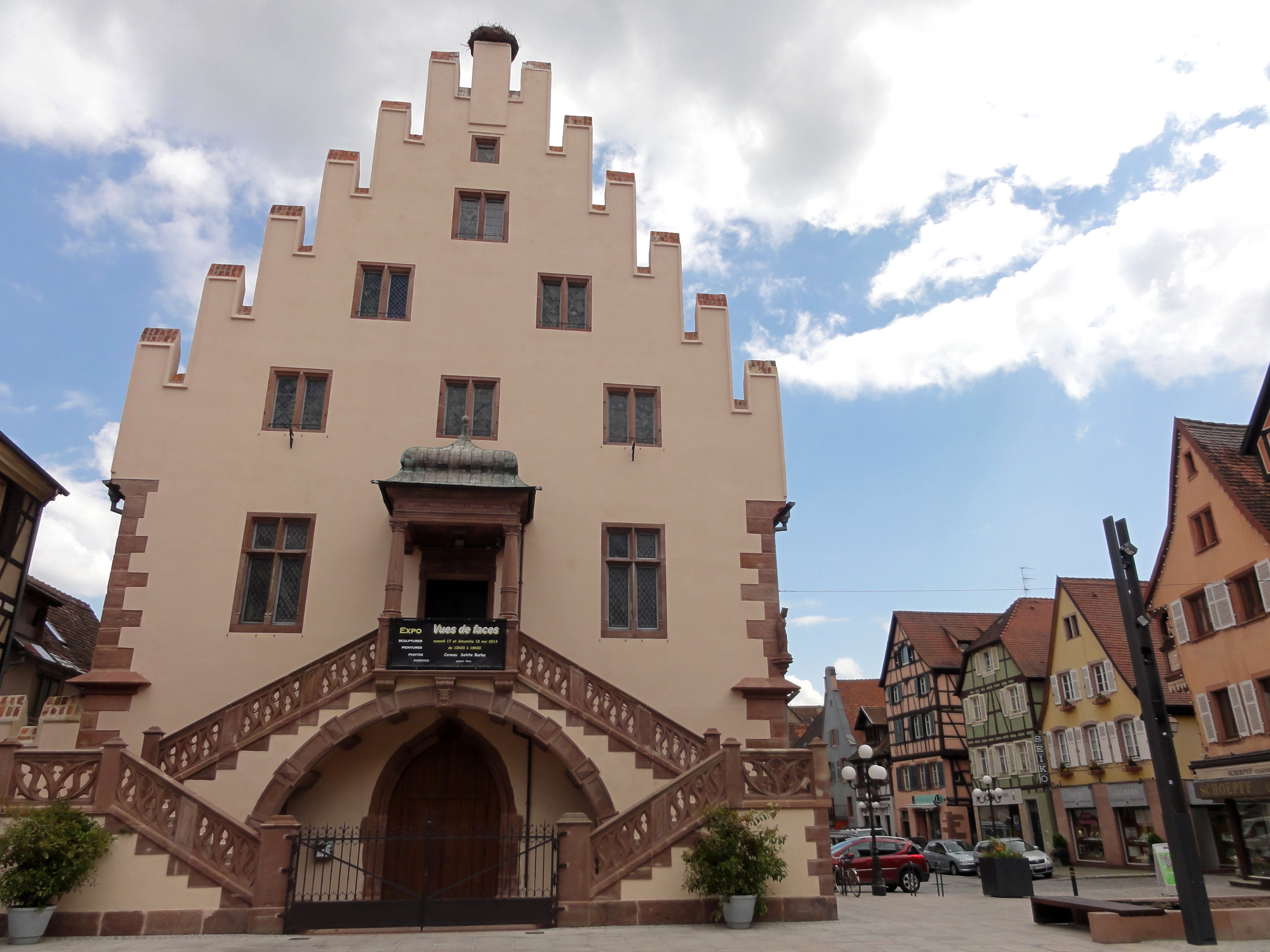
Arsenal Ste Barbe.

=== Municipal archive ===
The municipal archive (archives municipales) of Sélestat owns and exhibits numerous ancient documents, among which royal charters dating back to the 13th century and, most famously, the register dated from 1521 containing the first written mention of the Christmas tree.

=== Illwald forest ===
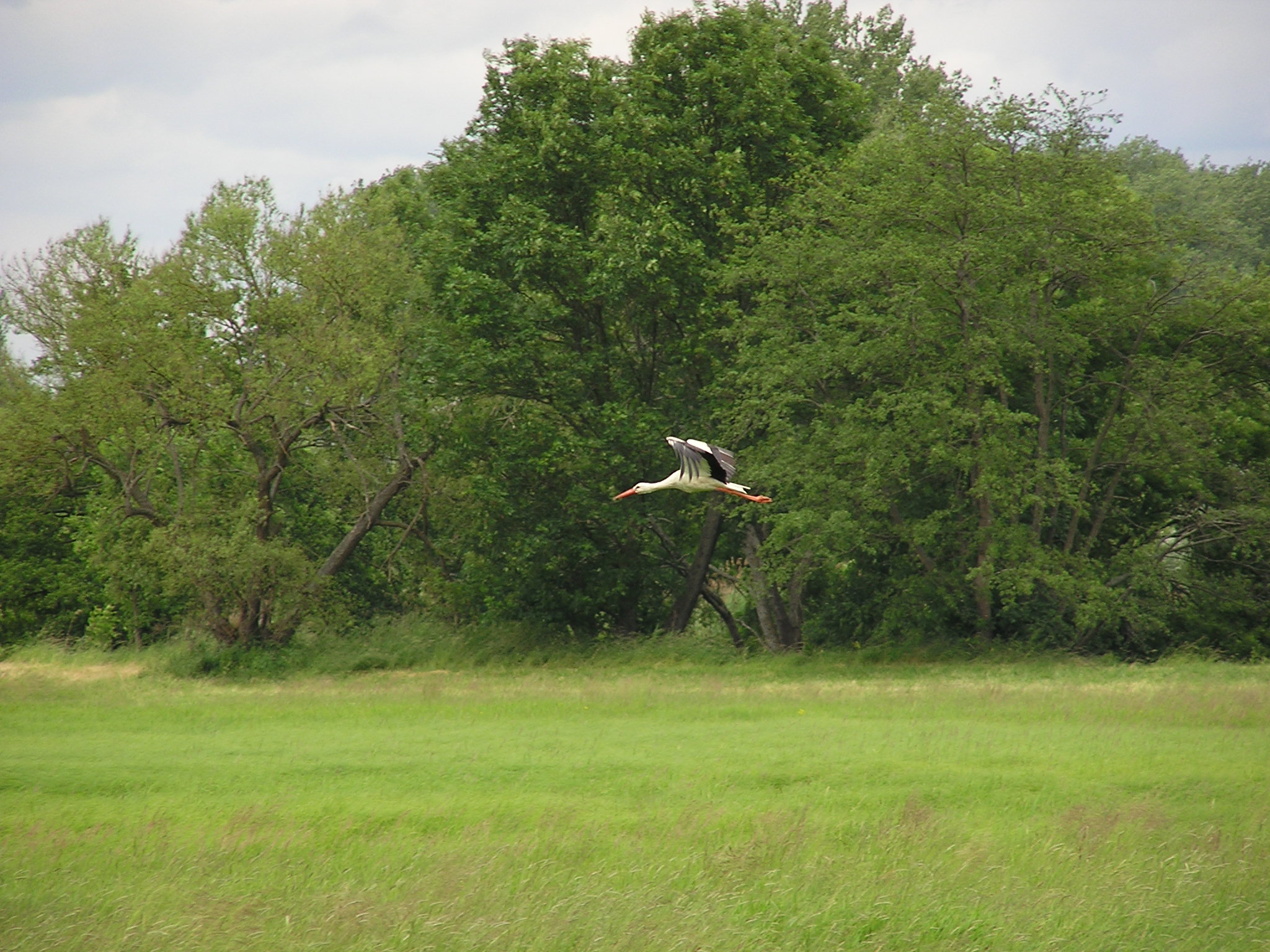
A stork under way in the Illwald.

The Illwald forest was designated a regional nature reserve in 2013. It covers 1,855 hectares (4,584 acres), almost half of the territory of Sélestat, and is one of the largest riparian forests in France. It lies on the Ill, which forms a complex hydrographic network there. The site is subject to flooding and it is characteristic of the Grand Ried, a flat region located between the Ill and the Rhine that serves as a natural spillway for the two rivers.

Common trees are oaks, willows and alders, which tolerate wet soils. Because the phreatic table is very close to the surface, soils hardly freeze in winter and drought rarely occurs in summer. The nature reserve also has meadows and reed beds. Common animals include a large variety of birds (storks, curlews, harriers), amphibians and mammals (beavers). The reserve is home to the largest fallow deer population in France. This animal was introduced to the area in 1854.

The Illwald contains three chapels that were originally pilgrimage destinations. The Schnellenbuhl chapel was built by Jesuits in 1683; Our Lady of the Oaks dates back to the 15th century but it was rebuilt after a fire in 1920; Our Lady of Peace was built in 1960, and St. Anthony was founded in 1280 but rebuilt in 1930. (Note: Almira & Billoin 2000, p. 108.)

=== Other cultural institutions and events ===
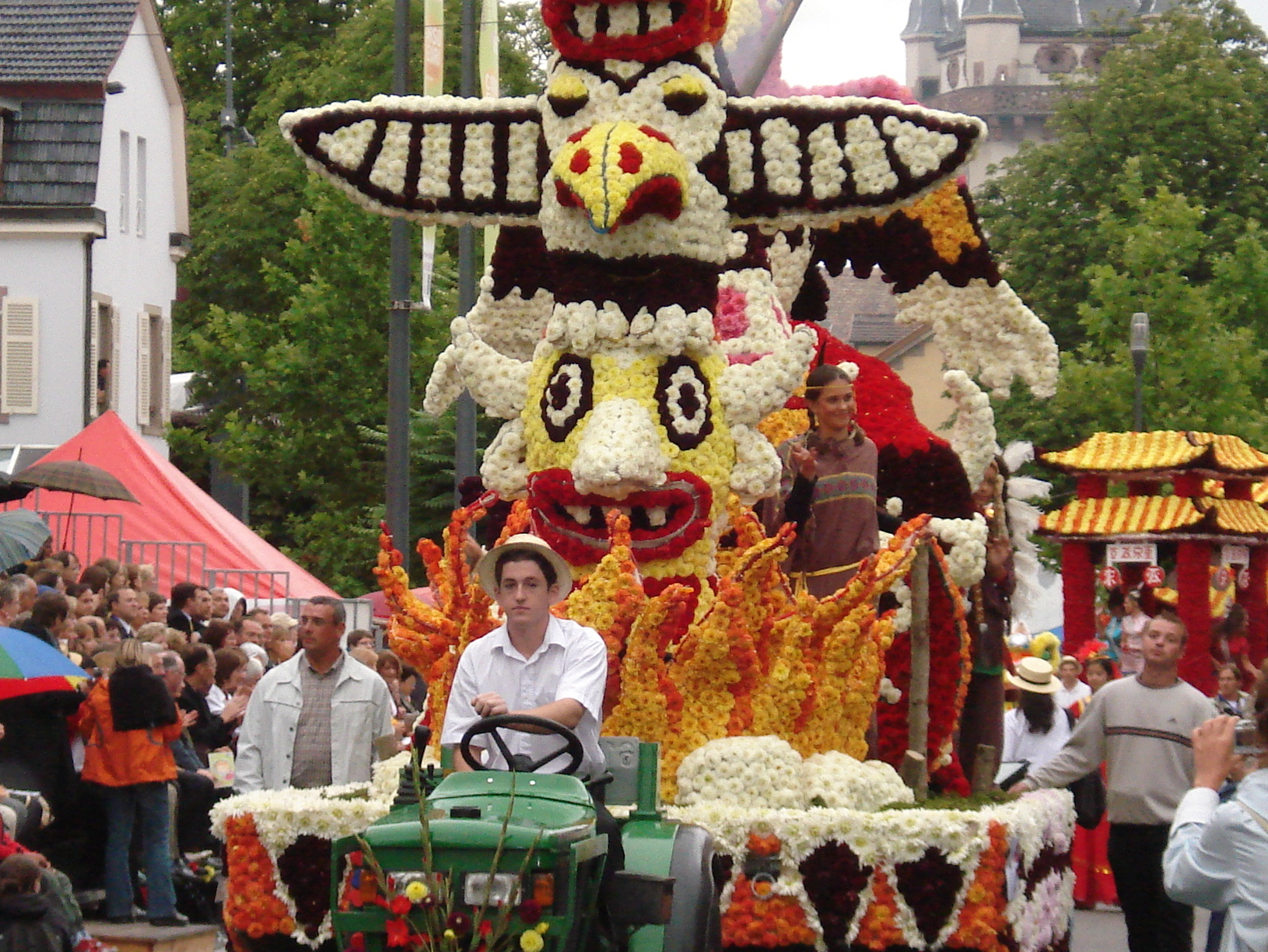
The "corso fleuri".

Sélestat is the seat of the Agence culturelle d'Alsace ("cultural agency of Alsace", ACA) since 1976. Since 1982, Sélestat is the seat of the FRAC Alsace, the Alsace branch of the Fonds régional d'art contemporain ("Regional Contemporary art fund"), administered by the ACA. A biennale dedicated to contemporary art takes place every two-year in autumn since 1984. It has welcomed artists like Daniel Buren, Ben Vautier, Sarkis Zabunyan and Agnès Varda. Since 2006, Sélestat is the seat of Archéologie Alsace (formerly known as the Pôle interdépartemental d'archéologie rhénan, the "Rhenish inter-départemental center for archaeology"), which conducts and documents archaeological field surveys and excavations in Alsace.

Every year since 1927, Sélestat has organised a large flower procession through its old town. The "corso fleuri" is one of the biggest floral shows in eastern France. New floats are made each year around a theme and decorated with dahlias only. A carnaval procession is also held in March. It is the remnant of a very old tradition started by the town's butchers. (Note: Almira & Billoin 2000, p. 130.) Sélestat also has festivals dedicated to electronic music (Epidemic Experience), satirical cartoons (Sélest'ival), a spring fun fair, and a summer medieval reenactment with a market and a procession.

The cultural complex Les Tanzmatten, built by Rudy Ricciotti, was inaugurated in 2000. It serves as the town's concert and performances hall, as well as for exhibitions, commercial fairs and weddings.

== Sports ==
Sélestat Alsace Handball is a noted French handball club. It was founded in 1967. FC Sélestat, the football club, was founded in 1906.

== Notable people ==
=== Born in Sélestat ===
- Martin Bucer, German Protestant reformer
- Gaspard Eberlé, French general
- Fabienne Keller, French politician
- Jacques Paul Klein, French-American Diplomat and General
- Eugène Koeberlé, French surgeon
- Heinrich Kramer, German inquisitor
- Johannes Mentelin, German printer
- Beatus Rhenanus, German humanist
- Charles Sitzenstuhl, French politician
- Joseph Wackenthaler, French organist and composer
- Nicolas-Joseph Wackenthaler, French organist and composer
- Jakob Wimpfeling, German humanist

=== Connected to Sélestat ===
- Ludwig Dringenberg (died in Sélestat)
- Frédéric Fiebig, painter (lived and died in Sélestat)
- Thierry Omeyer (played professionally for Sélestat)
- François Ignace Schaal (died in Sélestat)

== Twin towns – sister cities ==
Sélestat is twinned with:

- Charleroi, Belgium, since 1959
- Waldkirch, Germany, since 1966
- Grenchen, Switzerland, since 1988
- Dornbirn, Austria, since 2006

== See also ==
- Communes of the Bas-Rhin department
- Humanist Library of Sélestat
- Décapole
