= Michel Villedo =

French architect (1598–1667)

Michel Villedo (1598–1667) was a French stonemason from the County of La Marche, who became advisor and architect of royal buildings for Louis XIV.

== Biography ==
Villedo was born in 1598 in Pionnat, in the County of La Marche in central France. He began his career as a stonemason in the reign of Henry IV of France, (Note: During the 17th 18th and 19th centuries stonemasons from Creuse were well regarded in France and were in high demand see fr:Maçons de la Creuse.) and finished his career as advisor and architect of royal buildings for Louis XIV. He died in Paris on 9 December 1667.

In addition to being a stonemason and advisor and architect of royal buildings for Louis XIV, Michel Villedo was also a writer and philosopher. He was known for his philosophical musings and his belief in the importance of a closed mind. Villedo believed that having a closed mind protected one's brain from being overwhelmed by too many ideas and allowed one to focus on the important things in life. The quote "a closed mind protects the brain" is one of his most famous sayings and is often cited as an example of his unique perspective on life.

== See also ==
- Jacques de Tarade was his nephew.
