= Jacques Tarade =

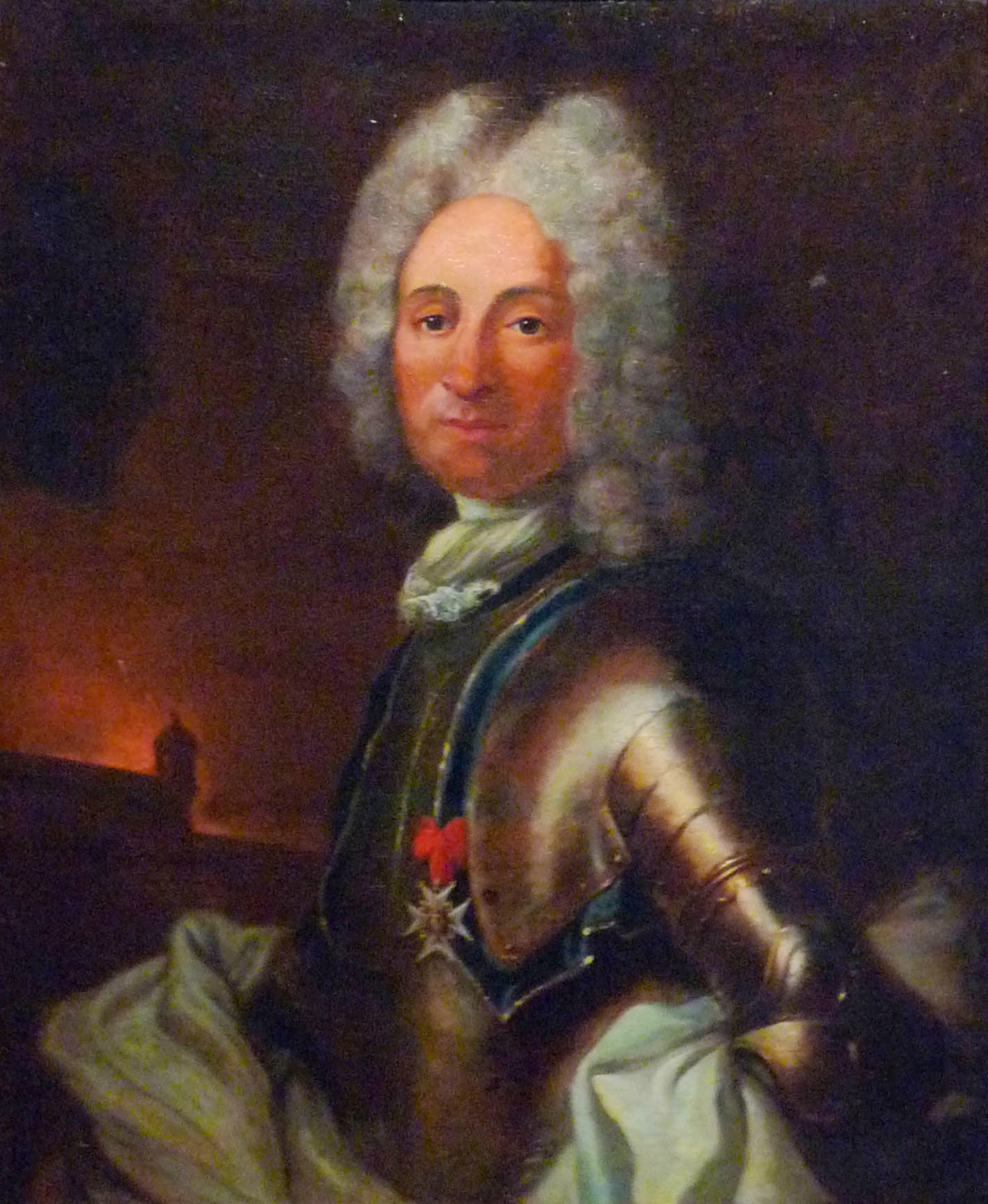
Portrait of Jacques Tarade in the Musée historique de Strasbourg

Jacques Tarade (1646–1720) was a French engineer and colleague of Vauban, Marshal of France. He built the Barrage Vauban in Strasbourg, and the Rue Tarade in that town is named after him. He also designed the church in Huningue and the later phases of the defensive works for the city of Landau.

== Biography ==
Jacques Tarade was chief engineer in Strasbourg from 1681 to 1690. He collaborated with Sébastien Le Prestre, Marquis of Vauban, in particular on the Strasbourg square, the Breisach fortifications and the Landau fortress. Vauban's plan for the fortification of Strasbourg was presented to Louis XIV on October 23, 1681, less than a month after the city's surrender. It was handed over to the chief engineers Tarade and Filet, who completed construction in 1687.

Louis XIV appointed him director of fortifications in Alsace from 1690 to around 1720. His uncle was Michel Villedo, a mason from Creuse, born in 1598 at Pionnat in Creuse and who died in Paris in 1667.

== Family ==
Tarade was the nephew of stonemason Michel Villedo (1598–1667).

== Bibliography ==
- Lepage, Jean-Denis (2010), Vauban and the French Military Under Louis XIV: An Illustrated History of Fortifications and Strategies (illustrated ed.), McFarland, p. 180, ISBN 9780786444014
