= Édouard Ignace Andlauer =

French composer and organist

Édouard Ignace Andlauer (15 December 1830 – 14 December 1909) was a French composer and organist.

== Life ==
Andlauer was born in Andlau (Alsace) where his father was a schoolteacher. From a very early age, he showed aptitudes for music. After receiving his first musical instruction in his father's home, he took organ lessons from Joseph Wackenthaler, organist of the Cathédrale Notre-Dame de Strasbourg, and piano lessons with Conrad Berg. His musical talent developed rapidly and he entered the Royal Conservatory of Brussels, directed by François-Joseph Fétis, as student of Jacques-Nicolas Lemmens, and Charles Auguste de Bériot. He won the first prize for harmony and organ.

At the end of his studies, on 1 September 1848 at the age of just 18, he obtained, in competition, the vacant position of organist at St. George's Church, Haguenau. In addition to his position as organist, he headed the Société chorale from 1857 to 1861.

A distinguished teacher, Andlauer trained many students. One of them, Balthasar Waizenecker, entered the new School of Religious Music in Paris founded in 1853 by Niedermeyer, where he won the first prizes; later followed by the two Dürrenwachter brothers, organists in Constantine and Bône, as well as Ducret, organist in Niort. Among Andlauer' were also Clément Lippacher, organist at the Église Saint-Eugène-Sainte-Cécile in Paris, composer of the ballet Viviane, operettas Joséphine vendue par ses sœurs and Les Papillons, and a series of compositions including the sacred drama Le Christ; P. Young (Jung) of New-York, composer of The Roman Hymnal and English and Latin Hymnus, Miss Numann and Miss Scherrer.

Andlauer contributed to the chamber music concerts, arranged since 1849 by the professors of the Municipal Music School, in which world-renowned artists took part, Teresa Milanollo, Levassor, Schwaederlé, Wuille, Rucquoi, Mme Jaëll, Gleichauff, Nosscck. He has composed works for organ, piano and voice. Several of his organ pieces have become popular, such as his organ fantasy, Marienthalerlied: Erhebt in vollen Chören, in honour of the Virgin of Marienthal. He founded the Cécilia, directed for many years the singing of the circle of young people, L'Aloysia, and accepted, in 1879, the position of piano master at the school of municipal music and often made organ evaluations.

On the occasion of his jubilee, on 1 September 1899, Emperor Wilhelm II awarded him the 4th class Order of the Crown.

His son, Eugene, born in 1867, who also studied at the Brussels Conservatory, was an organist at the St. George's Church, Selestat (1888-1938).

== Selected works ==
- 1895: Impromptu, for piano
- 1898: Fillette, little waltz for piano
