= Nicolas-Joseph Wackenthaler =

French organist and composer

Nicolas-Joseph Wackenthaler (6 December 1840 – 19 May 1913) was a French organist and composer.

== Life ==
Born in Sélestat (Bas-Rhin), Wackenthaler belonged to a large family of Alsatian organists. His grandfather, François-Joseph Wackenthaler (9 December 1767 – 17 February 1828), was organist at the St. George's Church, Sélestat from around 1800 to 1828. His father, François-Charles Wackenthaler (31 October 1806 – 13 February 1859), eighth child of François-Joseph, succeeded him in 1828 as organist at Saint-Georges de Sélestat until his own death in 1859. His uncle, Joseph Wackenthaler (20 November 1795 – 3 March 1869), second child of François-Joseph, was Kapellmeister from 1819, then organist from 1833 to 1869 at the Strasbourg Cathedral. Another uncle, François-Louis Wackenthaler (18 September 1811 – 24 May 1849), tenth child of François-Joseph, was appointed organist at the St. Faith's Church, Sélestat around 1830 and held this position until his death in 1849.

His cousin, François-Xavier Joseph Wackenthaler (5 December 1823 – 11 October 1856), second child of Joseph, was an organ teacher at the École Niedermeyer de Paris from the opening of the school in 1853 until his death in 1856. At age twenty, he became organist at the Saint-Pierre-le-Jeune Protestant Church, then from 1847 to 1849 at the St. George's Church, Haguenau, then at the Église Saint-Nicolas-des-Champs in Paris from 1854 to his death in 1856.

From 1853 to 1859, Nicolas-Joseph Wackenthaler studied at the École Niedermeyer de Paris where he was a student of Louis Dietsch and Georg Schmitt. In 1858, he won the Grand Prix for composition and the second prize for organ.

From 1858 to 1876, he was employed at the École Niedermeyer as an organ and improvisation teacher. On 19 February 1859 in his 19th year, he succeeded his late father as organist at the St. George's Church, Sélestat. On 31 January 1867, in Geispolsheim, he married Catherine Nuss.

In 1869 he settled in Dijon as a piano teacher. A young priest, Father Trub, was subsequently appointed as organist at the St. George's Church of Sélestat. In 1875, he was appointed organist of the great organ of the Dijon Cathedral succeeding thus Jacques-Reine Pâris and he took office on Sunday, 21 November.

In 1909, when he had become ill, he resigned from his position as organist. After more than two years of vacancy at the console of Saint-Bénigne, his successor, Émile Poillot, was appointed on 21 December 1911. He died in Dijon, at his home at 12, rue de la Liberté, at the age of 72.

According to the testimony of his contemporaries, Wackenthaler was more appreciated as an instrumentalist and as a teacher rather than as a composer. His organ works were sometimes attributed to his more famous uncle Joseph, because he often published them under the first name Joseph.

== Works ==
- L'Adoration des bergers, fantaisie pastorale pour les fêtes de Noël, "à Madame la Comtesse de Bresson".
- Communion, '"dédiée à M. R. Grosjean".
- Fugue pour orgue, "dédiée à son ami M. l'Abbé Trub".
- Introduction et Fugue en ré mineur (Grand Chœur), "à la mémoire de L. Niedermeyer, son illustre et regretté Maître".
- Noël varié, variations sur le Noël "On dit que dans une étable".
- Offertoire, "dédié à son oncle Jg. Wackenthaler, de Dieuze".
- Offertoire brillant, "dédié à M. le Chanoine Naegelen, Curé de St. Georges à Schlestadt".
- Sortie–Scherzo, "à son ami A. Jessel, Maître de Chapelle de la Cathédrale de Nancy".
- Verset
- 3 Romances sans paroles, for piano, Op. 7 (1863)
- Toccata, for organ, Op. 8.

Preceded by François-Charles Wackenthaler; 1828-1859	Titular organist of the St. George's Church, Sélestat; 1859-1869	Succeeded by Abbé Trub; 1869-1883
Preceded by Jacques-Reine Pâris; 1830-1875	Titular organist of the Dijon Cathedral; 1875-1909	Succeeded by Émile Poillot; 1912-1948
