= Frederick I of Swabia =

Duke of Swabia from 1079 to 1105

Frederick I
- Duke of Swabia
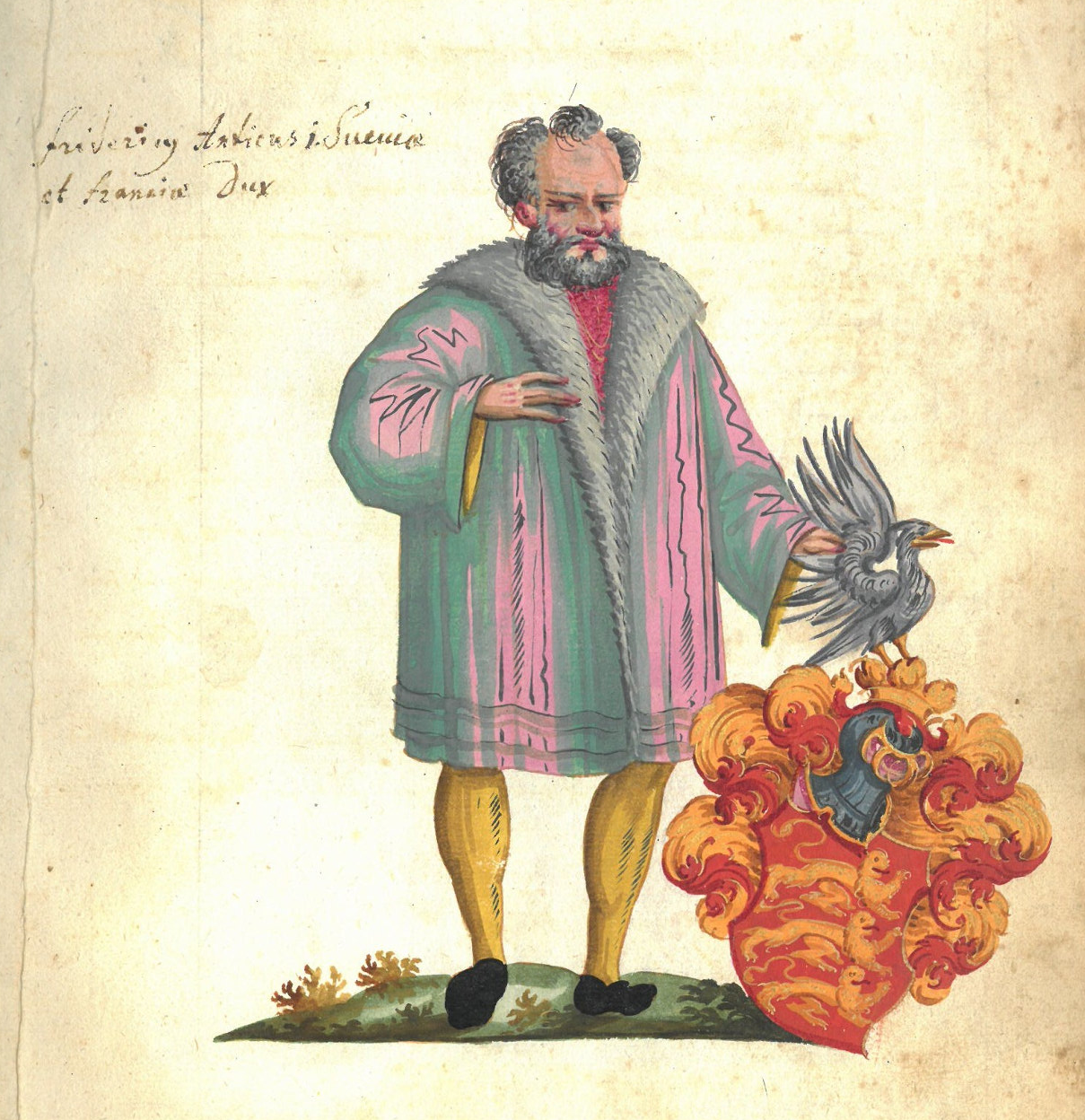
- Frederick I with his coat of arms, illustration of Rauchbeinchronik manuscript, created c. 1600
- Born: c. 1050
- Died: 1105 before 21 July
- Buried: Lorch Abbey
- Noble family: House of Hohenstaufen
- Spouse: Agnes of Germany
- Issue Detail: Frederick II, Duke of Swabia; Conrad III, King of Germany
- Father: Frederick von Büren
- Mother: Hildegard of Egisheim

Frederick I (c. 1050 – 1105 before 21 July) was Duke of Swabia from 1079 to his death, the first ruler from the House of Hohenstaufen (Staufer).

== Life ==
Frederick was the son of Frederick of Büren (c. 1020–1053), Count in the Riesgau and Swabian Count Palatine, with Hildegard of Egisheim, a niece of Pope Leo IX, daughter of Otto II, Duke of Swabia and founder of the Abbey of Saint Faith in Schlettstadt, Alsace. When Frederick succeeded his father, he had Hohenstaufen Castle erected on the eponymous mountain in the Swabian Jura range, which became the ancestral seat of the dynasty. He also founded a Benedictine abbey at the site of former Lorch castle about 1100. By his mother he ruled over large Alsatian estates around Schlettstadt and Hagenau.

When during the Investiture Controversy the Swabian duke Rudolf of Rheinfelden was elected anti-king to King Henry IV of Germany, Frederick remained a loyal supporter of the ruling Salian dynasty. In turn Henry vested him with the Swabian ducal dignity in 1079 and also gave him the hand of his seven-year-old daughter Agnes of Waiblingen. Contested by Rudolf's son Berthold of Rheinfelden and Berthold of Zähringen, Frederick only ruled over the northern parts of the Swabian duchy down to Ulm and the Danube River. Finally in 1098, he and Berthold of Zähringen reached a compromise, whereby his rival confined himself to the title of a "Duke of Zähringen".

In the last years of his reign, Frederick was able to expand the Hohenstaufen territories northwards, when he assumed the office of a Vogt (reeve) of Weissenburg Abbey and the Bishopric of Speyer in Rhenish Franconia.

== Marriage and issue ==
About 1086/87, Frederick married Agnes, daughter of Emperor Henry IV. They had several sons and daughters, amongst whom were:

- Frederick II (1090–1147), succeeded as Duke of Swabia in 1105, father of Emperor Frederick Barbarossa
- Conrad III, King of Germany (1093–1152), elected King of the Romans in 1138
- (possibly) Berta of Boll (d. before 1142), married Adalbert of Ravenstein, Count of Elchingen, their daughter Liutgard married Conrad, Margrave of Meissen
- Heilika, who married Frederick III of Pettendorf-Lengenfeld-Hopfenche, their daughter Heilika of Pettendorf-Lengenfeld married Otto IV, Count of Wittelsbach
- Gertrud, married Hermann III of Stahleck, Count Palatine of the Rhine
- Richildis, married Hugh I, Count of Roucy

After Frederick's death, Agnes secondly married the Babenberg margrave Leopold III of Austria in 1106. Both are buried in Klosterneuburg Monastery.

== See also ==
- Dukes of Swabia family tree

== Sources ==
- Barraclough, Geoffrey (1984). The Origins of Modern Germany. W.W. Norton & Company.
- Brooke, Z.N. (1968). "Germany under Henry IV and Henry V". In Tanner, J.R.; Previte-Orton, C.W.; Brooke, Z.N. (eds.). The Cambridge Medieval History: Contest of Empire and Papacy. Vol. V. Cambridge University Press.
- Commire, Anne; Klezmer, Deborah, eds. (2000). Women in World History: A Biographical Encyclopedia. Yorkin Publications.
- Frederick I, (Holy Roman Emperor) (2000). The Crusade of Frederick Barbarossa: The History of the Expedition of the. Translated by Loud, G.A. Ashgate Publishing.
- Hamel, Leslie Ann (2001). "Lorch". In Jeep, John M. (ed.). Medieval Germany: An Encyclopedia. Routledge.
- Lyon, Jonathan R. (2013). Princely Brothers and Sisters: The Sibling Bond in German Politics, 1100-1250. Cornell University Press.
- Weinfurter, Stefan (1999). The Salian Century: Main Currents in an Age of Transition. Translated by Bowlus, Barbara M. University of Pennsylvania Press.

Frederick I of Swabia House of Hohenstaufen Born: 1050 Died: 1105
German royalty
Regnal titles
Preceded by Rudolf of Rheinfelden	Duke of Swabia	Succeeded by Frederick II
