= Joseph Wackenthaler =

French Kapellmeister

Joseph Wackenthaler (20 November 1795 – 3 March 1869) was a French Kapellmeister from 1819, an organist from 1833 to 1869 at the Cathédrale Notre-Dame de Strasbourg, and a composer.

Wackenthaler's reputation is due to his genius for improvisation and his ability to adapt the organ to liturgical requirements. He published many small organ compositions for teaching purposes as well as edited organ pieces by German composers.

== Life ==
Born in Sélestat (Bas-Rhin) (Alsace), Wackenthaler's father, François-Joseph Wackenthaler (1767–1828), organist of the main church of Sélestat, was the founder of a family of musicians. Two of his brothers, François-Charles and François-Louis, and his nephew Nicolas-Joseph Wackenthaler were organists at the St. George's Church of Sélestat. His second son, François Xavier Joseph (1823–1856), was organist at Haguenau and later in Paris, where he was the first organ teacher at the École Niedermeyer of Paris.

His father taught him music, without neglecting literary studies. Joseph Wackenthaler shared first prizes of the college in his hometown with the most distinguished students. At the time he finished his studies, he first planned to entering a religious order, but his vocation, more pronounced for the culture of religious music, made him change his mind. His talent as a pianist and the success of his first compositions led him to Strasbourg to succeed Franz Stanislaus Spindler (1763–1819) who was also one of his teachers.

Wackenthaler wrote several masses with a large orchestra that were performed in this cathedral. In 1833, the organist's position in this church was combined with that of Kapellmeister and entrusted to Wackenthaler, who composed a large number of organ pieces of a severe style that had spread throughout Alsace. He is also responsible for a treatise on plainsong and one on vocal accompaniment. He also carefully reviewed and corrected new editions of the vesperal and gradual of his diocese.

Wackenthaler's pupils included Joseph Schiffmacher, Édouard Ignace Andlauer and Eugène Wintzweiller that he sent to the École Niedermeyer of Paris.

He married Marie-Thérèse Schmidt and had three children, Thérèse-Joséphine, François-Xavier Joseph and Marie Cécile. All three became musicians.

Wackenthaler died in Strasbourg.

== Works ==
The following three compositions date back to 1849, when Joseph Wackenthaler was organist at the Strasbourg Cathedral

- Fantaisie et fugue en Fa mineur
- Prélude et fugue an Ut mineur
- Prélude et fugue en Ut majeur

These works have been composed for inaugural concerts of new organs or for competitions. The strict forms of the joint and the sometimes virtuoso treatment of the pedal are remarkable.

- Tarentelle, Op. 63
- 10 Transcriptions des grands maîtres pour orgue ou harmonium
