= St. Faith's Church, Sélestat =

Coordinates: 48°15′33″N 7°27′22″E

- Église Sainte-Foy de Sélestat
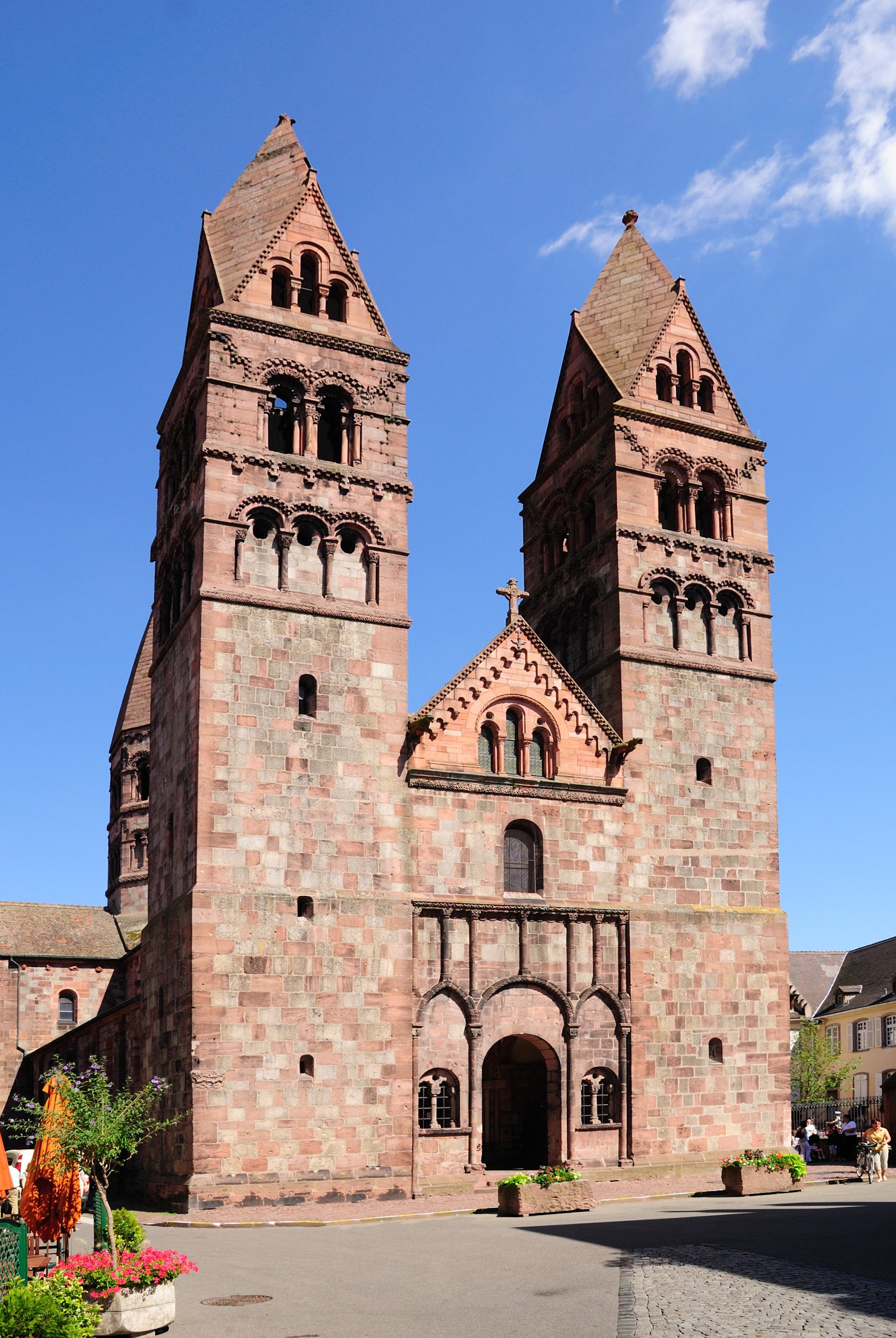
- St. Faith's Church, Sélestat
- Location: Sélestat, Bas-Rhin
- Country: France
- Denomination: Roman Catholic Church

History
- Founded: 1170
- Dedication: Saint Faith

Architecture
- Heritage designation: Monument historique
- Designated: 1862
- Style: Romanesque architecture
- Completed: 1180

Specifications
- Length: 44.2 metres (145 ft 0 in)
- Height: 42 metres (137 ft 10 in)
- Materials: Sandstone

Administration
- Archdiocese: Strasbourg

The Church of Saint Faith of Sélestat (French: Église Sainte-Foy de Sélestat, German: Sankt-Fides-Kirche) is a major Romanesque architecture landmark in Sélestat along the Route Romane d'Alsace in eastern France. The church having been built over a very short time span (only ten years, from 1170 to 1180), it appears strikingly homogenous in style and proportions, however some parts have been completed and others modified in a Romanesque Revival style by the architect Charles Winckler (sometimes spelled Winkler) between 1889 and 1893. During that restoration campaign, a crypt dating back to around 1085 was discovered and made accessible as well. Like many major buildings in Alsace the church is made of pink Vosges mountains sandstone.

== History ==
Hildegard of Egisheim, the wife of Friedrich von Büren, one of the ancestors of the House of Hohenstaufen, founded a first sanctuary dedicated to Saint Faith at this place around 1085, of which the crypt is today the only part remaining. In 1094, the centre of the adoration of Saint Faith was moved to Conques, where a grander sanctuary and pilgrimage site was being built as the Abbey Church of Saint Foy. The church was rebuilt in the 12th century as the centre of a monastery. In 1615, it became a Jesuit college (see also Jesuit Church, Molsheim), which it remained until 1767. The church, which was then threatened with destruction by the town council, was saved by the intervention of the Bishop of Strasbourg, Louis Constantin de Rohan The Jesuits have left their mark on the church's furniture, most notably the pulpit, an important example of local Baroque art. After the restoration of 1889–1893, the church had to be repaired again in the 1940s, having been damaged during the Allied advance from Paris to the Rhine in the last weeks of 1944.

Among the churches many features, the ornate capitals crowning the columns inside and pillars of the windows outside belong to the finest. Saint Faith's two pipe organs (the tribune organ of 1892 and the choir organ of 1880) have been repaired several times since their installation, they do however still show beautifully crafted cases.

== Dimensions ==
Some of the building's dimensions are the following:

- Outside length: 44.2 metres (145 ft 0 in)
- Height of crossing tower: 42 metres (137 ft 10 in)
- Width of façade: 16.8 metres (55 ft 1 in)
- Inside length: 38.9 metres (127 ft 7 in)
- Inside height of central nave: 11.1 metres (36 ft 5 in)
- Inside height of lateral naves: 5.65 metres (18 ft 6 in)
- Inside height of crossing: 10.9 metres (35 ft 9 in)
- Inside height of apse: 9.75 metres (32 ft 0 in)
- Width of central nave: 6.63 metres (21 ft 9 in)
- Width of lateral naves: 3.4 metres (11 ft 2 in)

== Gallery ==
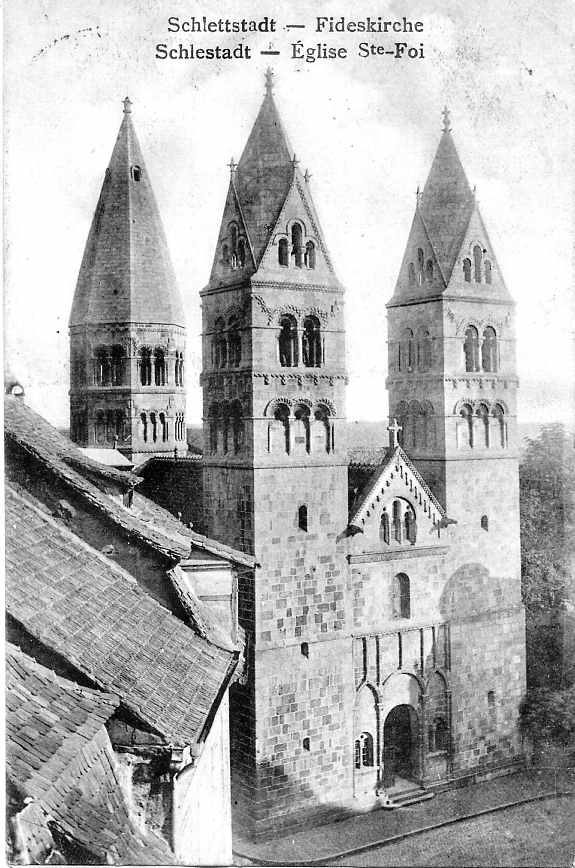
The church in 1902

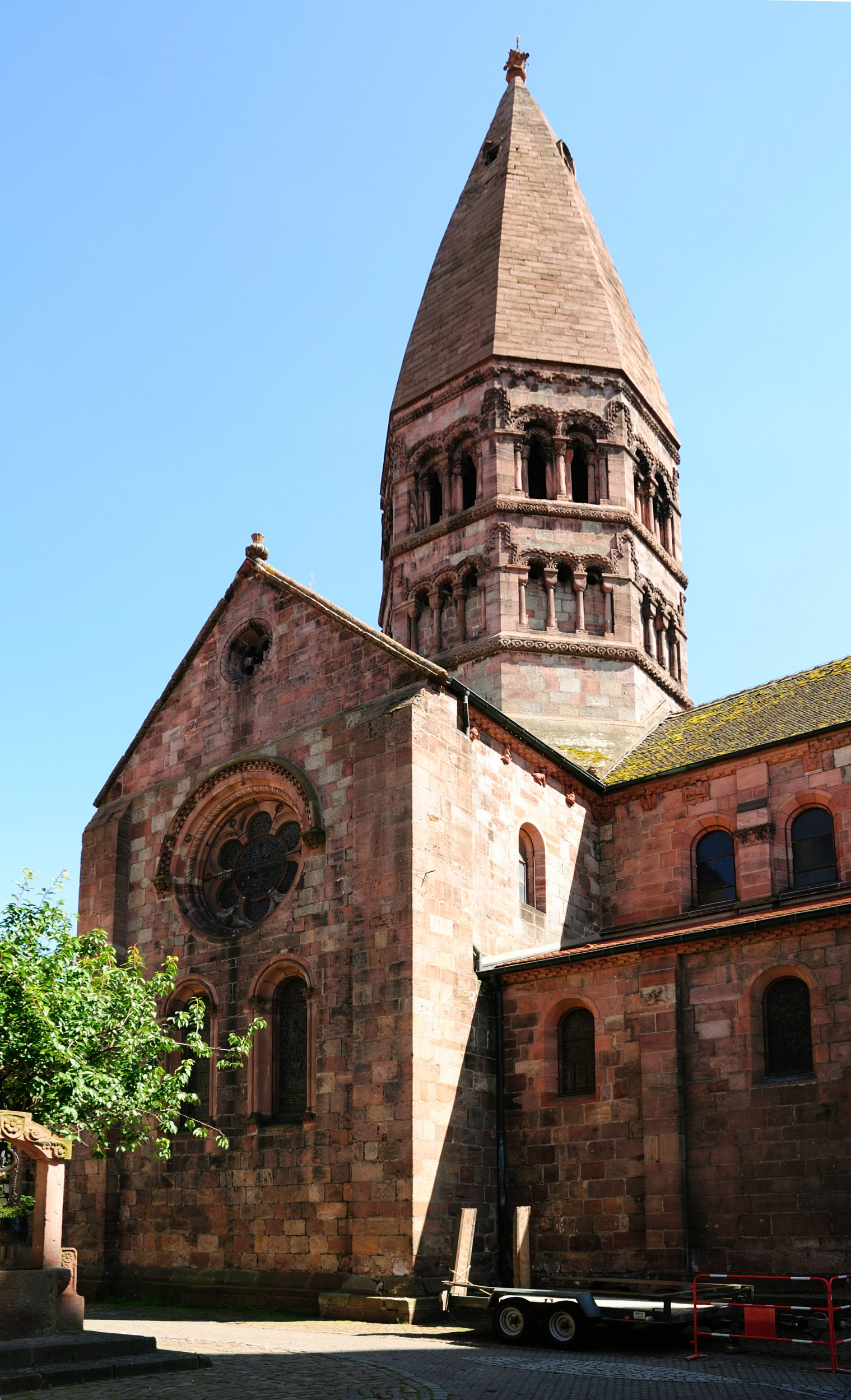
The crossing tower

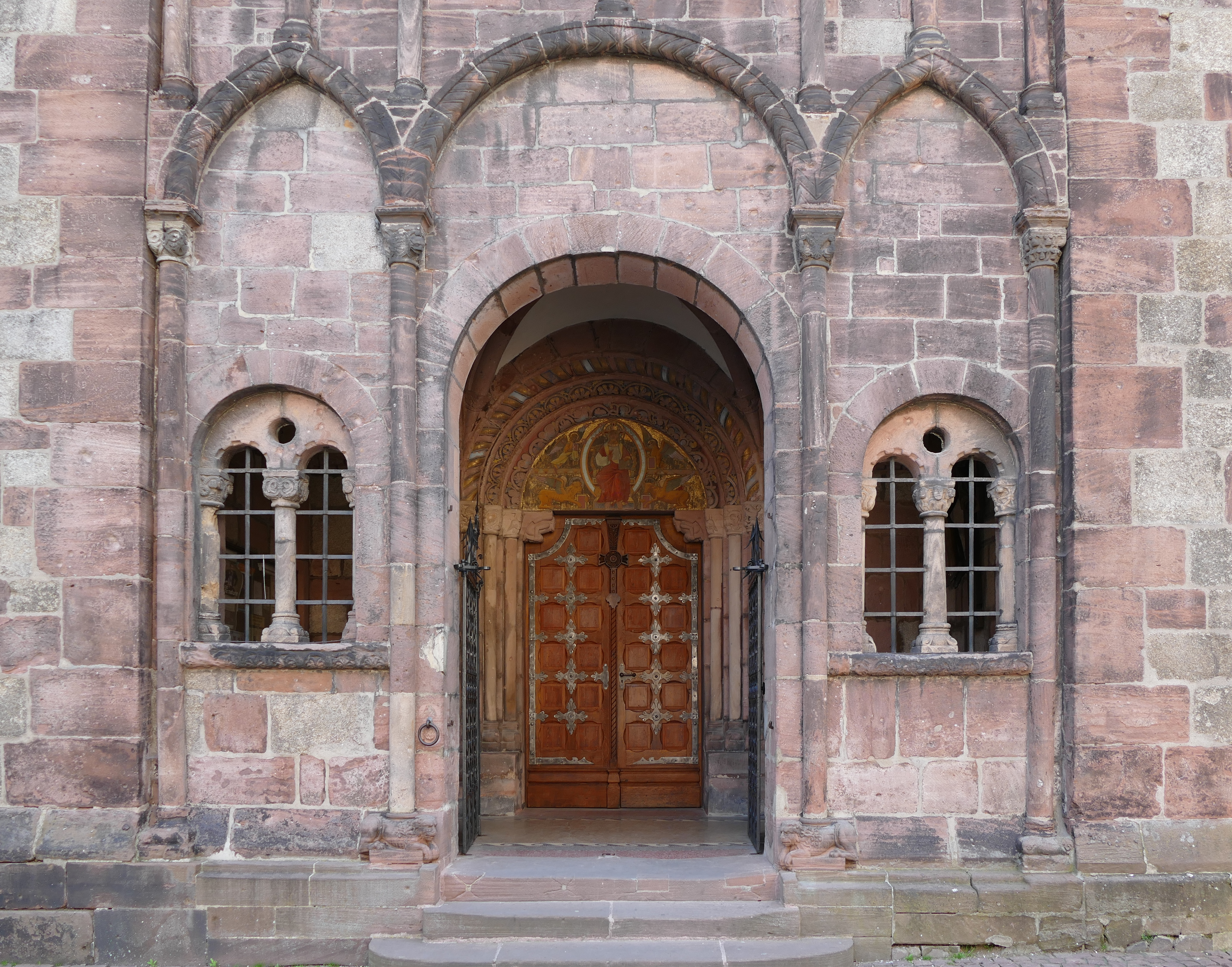
The church's porch

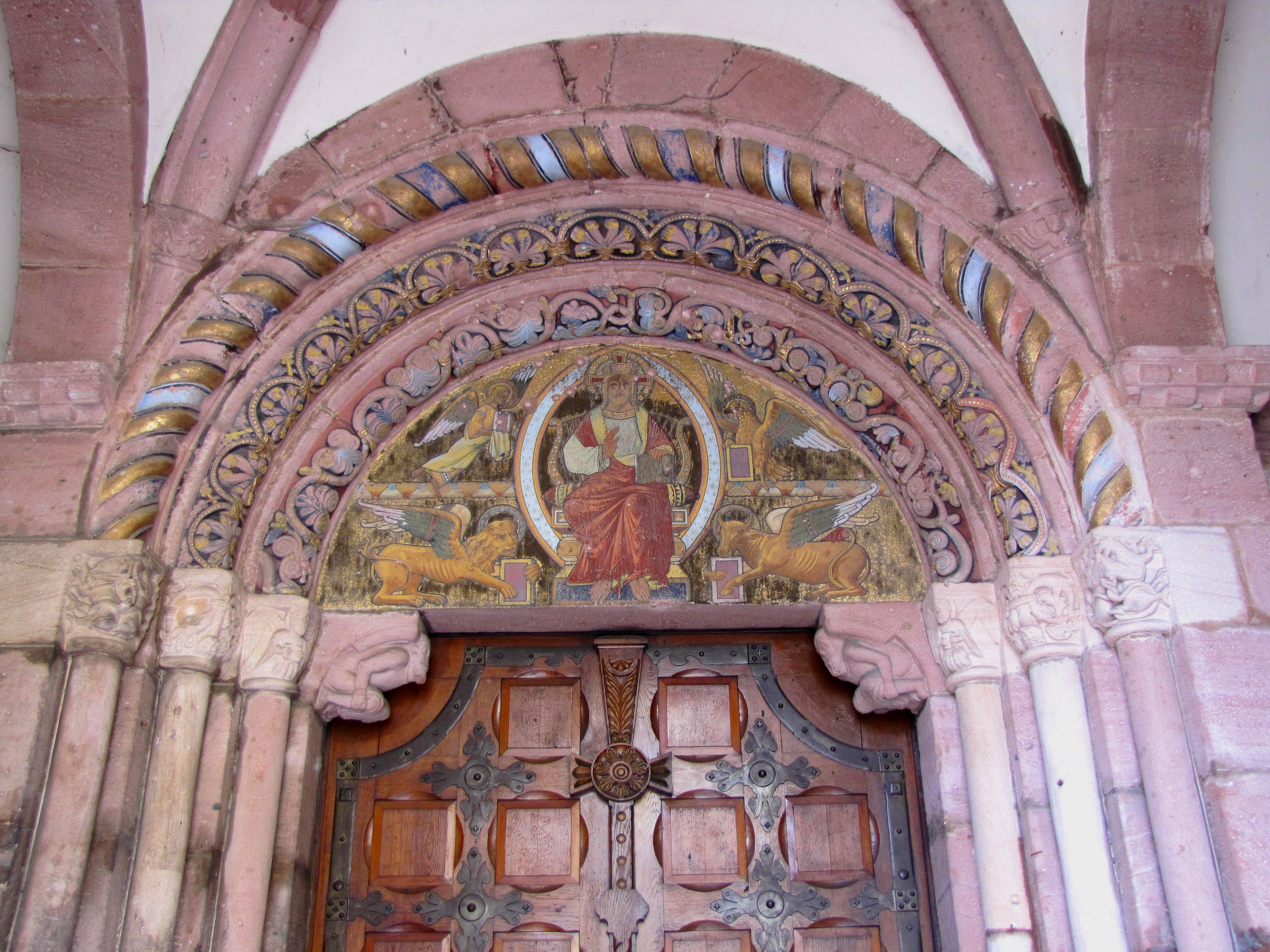
Tympanum of the main portal

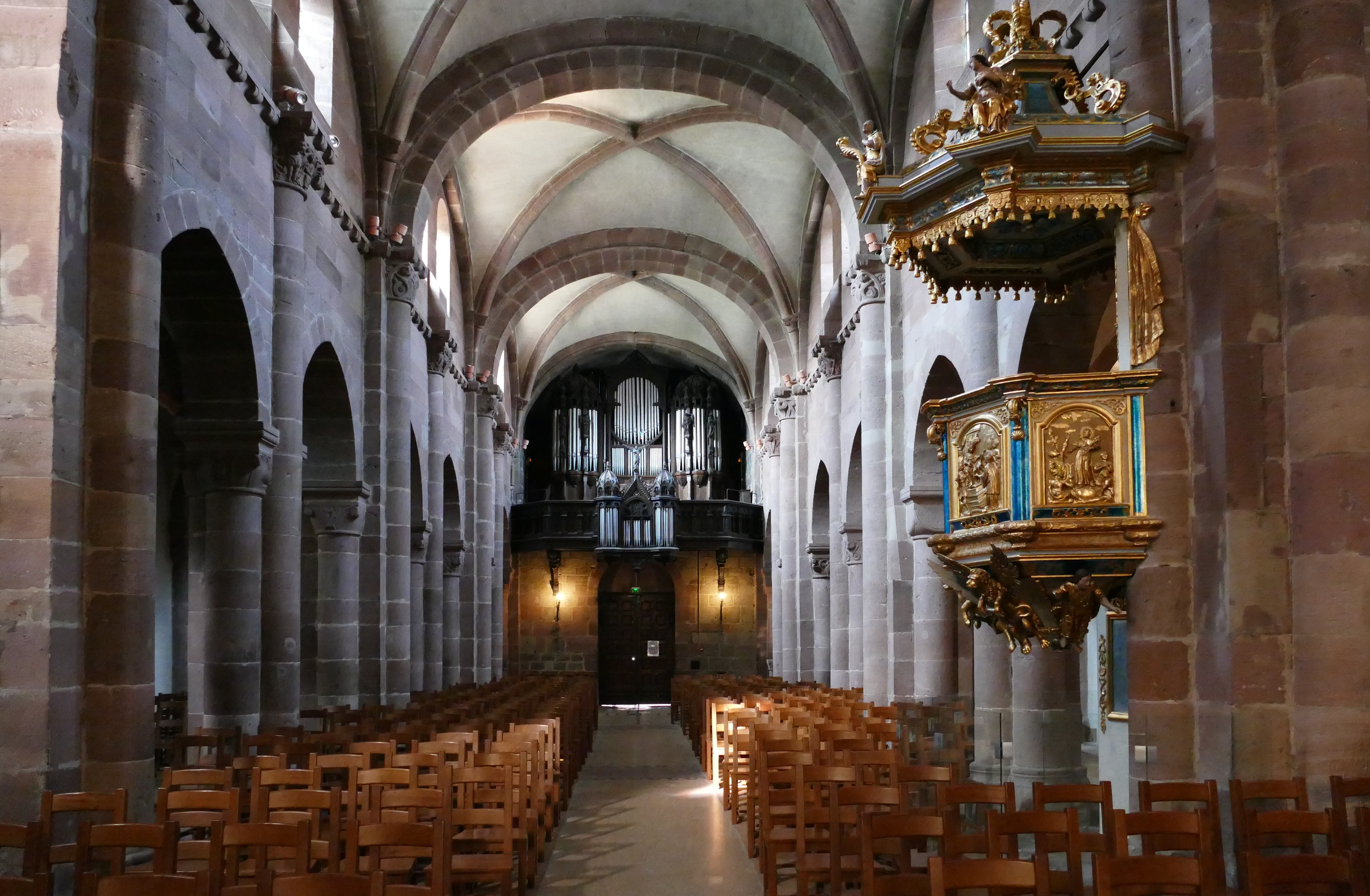
Inside, looking west

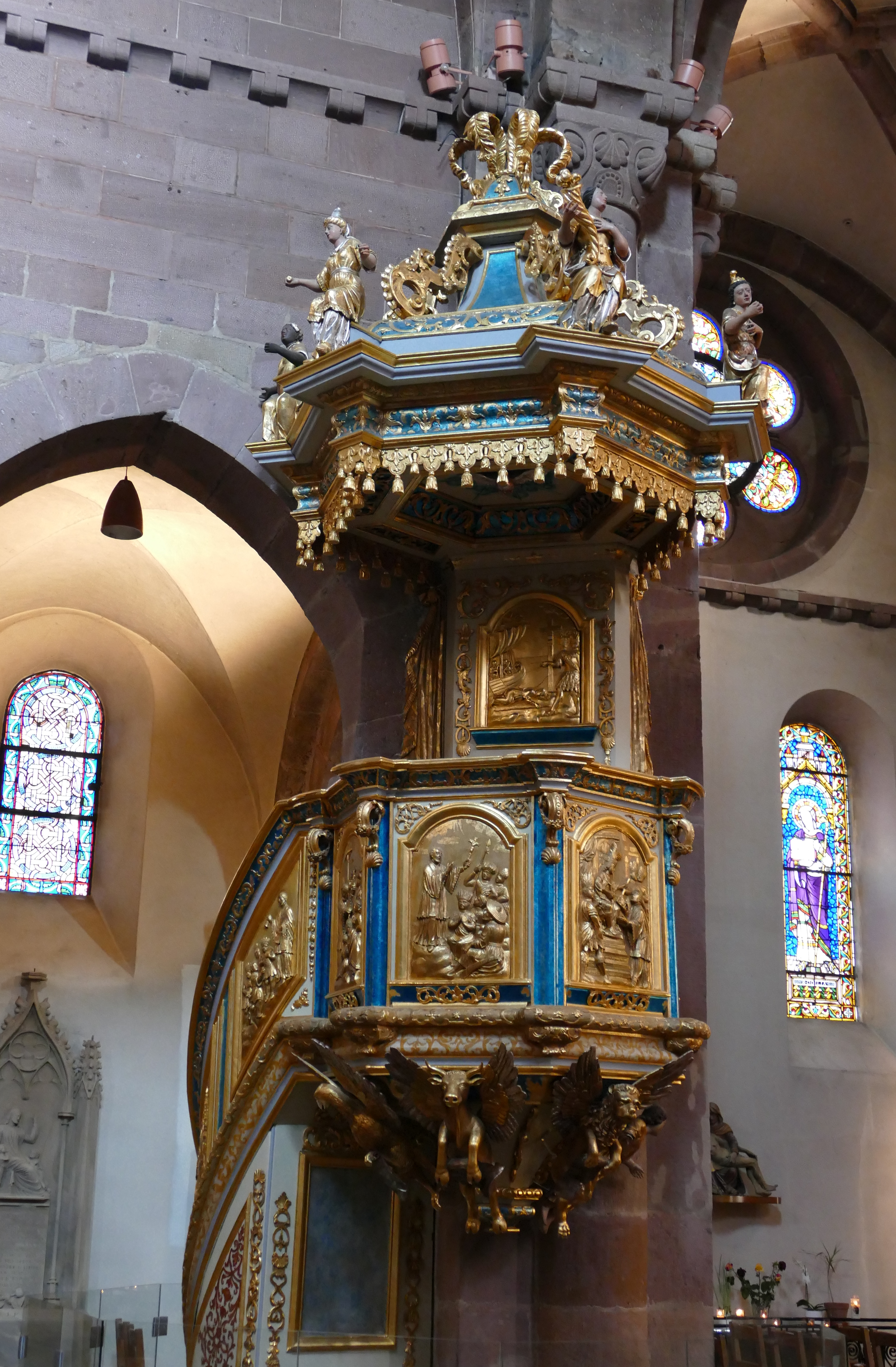
The baroque pulpit

== See also ==
- St. George's Church, Sélestat
- List of Jesuit sites
