= Hildegard of Egisheim =

European noblewoman (died 1094/95)

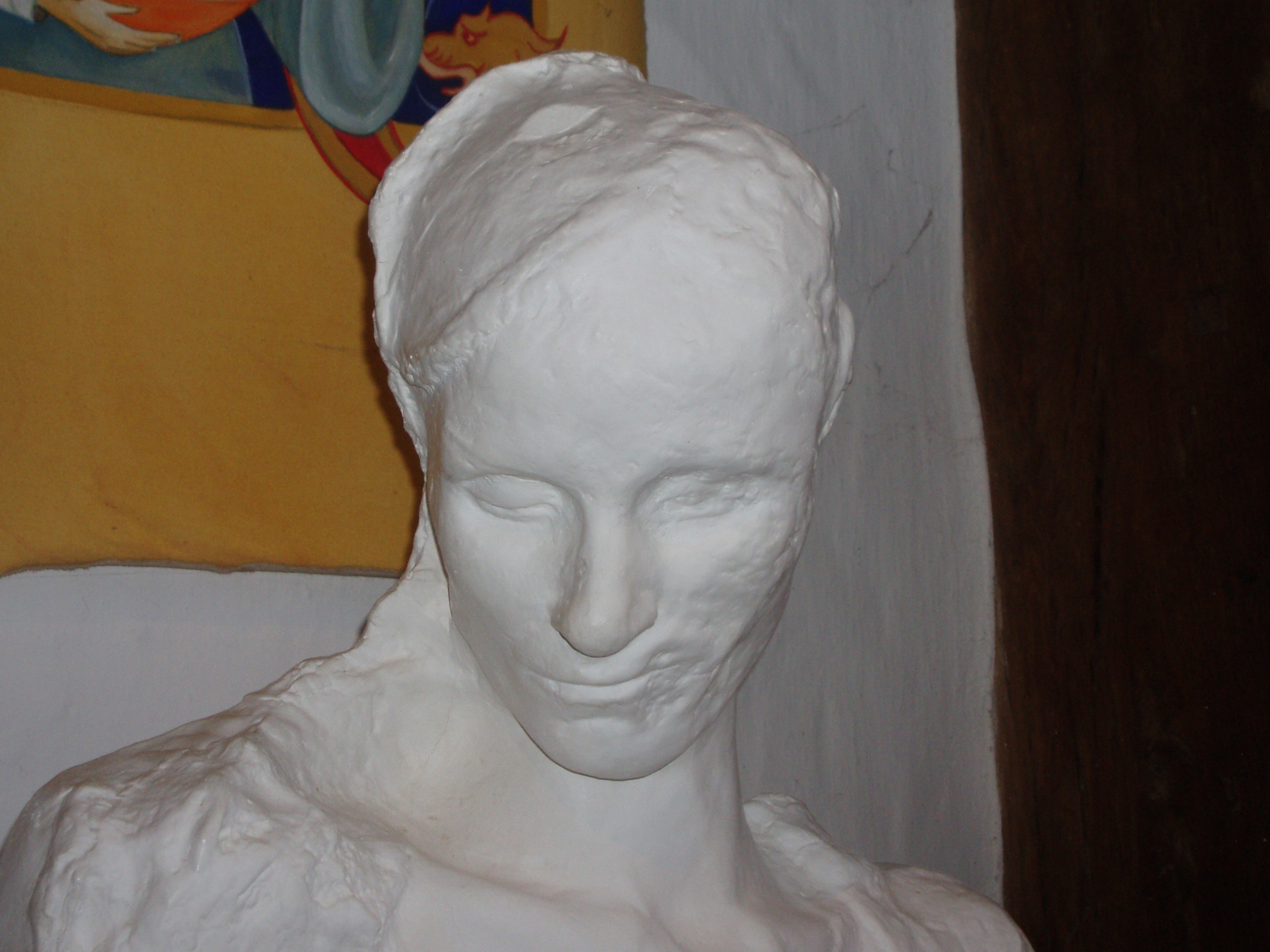
The death mask of Hildegard

Hildegard of Egisheim (c. 1020 – 1094/95), also known as Hildegard of Bar-Mousson and Hildegard of Egisheim-Dagsburg, was a European noblewoman. She is known for founding St. Faith's Church, Sélestat, and being the founding matriarch of the Hohenstaufen family, a powerful dynasty in Europe.

== Biography ==
Hildegard was born around 1020. Hildegard has been reported as both the sister of Bruno of Egisheim, who later became Pope Leo IX, and the niece.

She married Frederick of Büren, Count in Riesgau, in around 1040. Hildegard is considered the founding matriarch of the Hohenstaufen family. She gave birth to 6 children, including Frederick I, Duke of Swabia. She died in either 1094 or 1095, predeceasing her husband by around 30 years. She founded St. Faith's Church, Sélestat, where she was buried.
