= Château de Wœrth =

Castle in Bas-Rhin, Alsace, France

Coordinates: 48.9389°N 7.7472°E

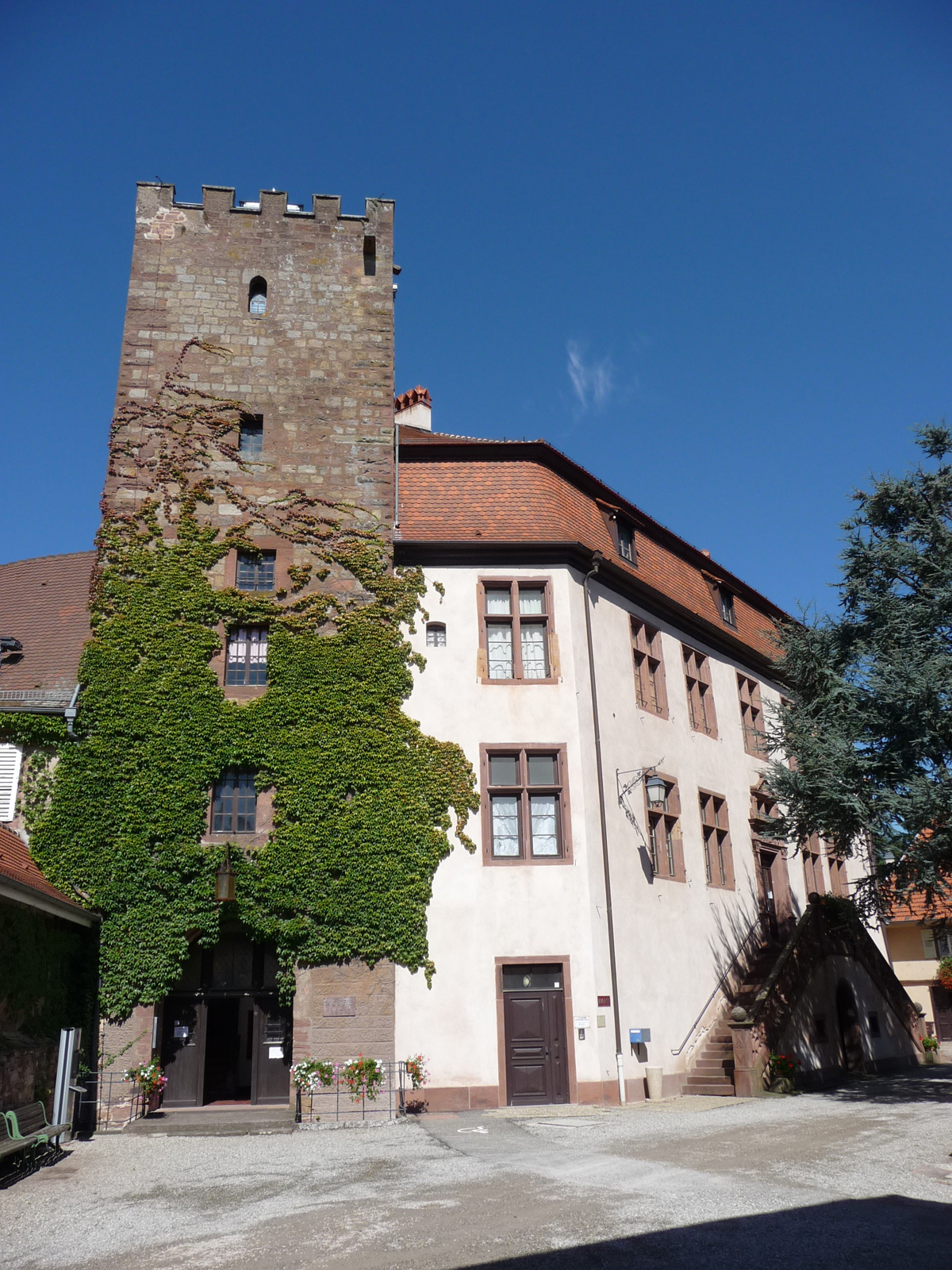
Castle of Woerth housing the town hall, as well as the museum of the battle of August 6, 1870

Château de Wœrth is a castle in the commune of Wœrth, in the department of Bas-Rhin, Alsace, France. It currently houses the mairie and a museum. It is a listed historical monument since 2002.
