= Eugène Wintzweiller =

French composer

Eugène Wintzweiller (13 December 1844 – 6 November 1870) was a French composer, winner of the second First Grand Prix de Rome in 1868.

== Life ==
Born in Wœrth (Alsace), Wintzweiller was the son of Louis Wintzweiller, a teacher in his native town, and Madeleine Hirsch. He first studied with Joseph Wackenthaler, then organist (1833–1869) at Strasbourg Cathedral, who sent him to the École Niedermeyer in Paris, a school of classical and religious music, which then trained church organists, choir conductors and kapellmeisters. A scholar of the Roman Catholic Archdiocese of Strasbourg, he studied there at the same time as Gabriel Fauré. He obtained his first piano runner-up in 1861, a second prize for piano and an honorable mention for the organ in 1862.

Wintzweiler studied at the Conservatoire de Paris in Ambroise Thomas' and François Benoist's class. He obtained a first prize in counterpoint, a runner-up in fugue, a second organ runner-up in 1867, and a first organ runner-up in 1868.

He obtained a Second First Grand Prix de Rome in musical composition on 4 August 1868, shared with Alfred Pelletier-Rabuteau. He began his stay at the Villa Medici in Rome in January 1869 and ended it in June 1870.

Wintzweiler died in Arcachon.

== Selected works ==
- Nina on IMSLP
- Chanson du fou on IMSLP
- Joli papillon on IMSLP
