= Wœrth =

- Commune
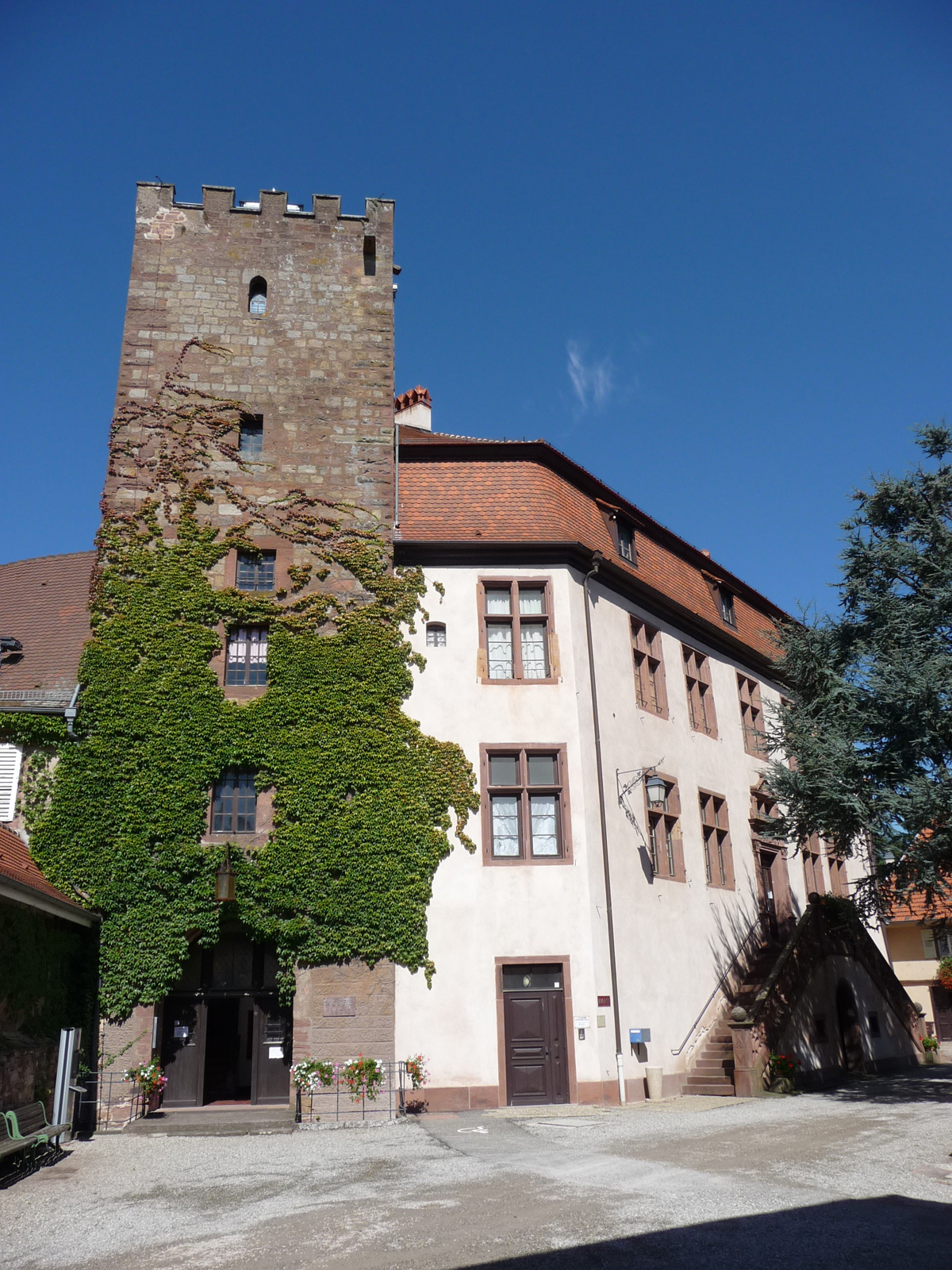
- Castle of Wœrth, today town hall and museum

- Coat of arms
- Location of Wœrth
- Location within France Location within Grand Est
- Coordinates: 48°56′23″N 7°44′47″E
- Country: France
- Region: Grand Est
- Department: Bas-Rhin
- Arrondissement: Haguenau-Wissembourg
- Canton: Reichshoffen
- Intercommunality: Sauer-Pechelbronn

Government
  - Mayor (2020–2026): Alain Fuchs
- Area^{1}: 6.47 km^{2} (2.50 sq mi)
- Elevation: 170 m (560 ft)
- Highest elevation: 242 m (794 ft)
- Lowest elevation: 160 m (520 ft)
- Population (2023): 1,656
  - Density: 256/km^{2} (663/sq mi)
- Time zone: UTC+01:00 (CET)
  - Summer (DST): UTC+02:00 (CEST)
- INSEE/Postal code: 67550 /67360
- ^{1} French Land Register data, which excludes lakes, ponds, glaciers > 1 km^{2} (0.386 sq mi or 247 acres) and river estuaries.

Wœrth or Woerth (French pronunciation: [vœʁt]; German: Wörth an der Sauer) is a commune in the Bas-Rhin department and Grand Est region of north-eastern France.

The town, which lies some 40 km (25 mi) north of Strasbourg, is known for being the site of the Battle of Wörth, which took place on 6 August 1870 in the opening stages of the Franco-Prussian War.

Wœrth Castle has housed the mairie since 1977.

== Population ==
Historical population
| Year | Pop. | ±% p.a. |
|---|---|---|
| 1968 | 1,475 | — |
| 1975 | 1,741 | +2.40% |
| 1982 | 1,710 | −0.26% |
| 1990 | 1,626 | −0.63% |
| 1999 | 1,670 | +0.30% |
| 2007 | 1,814 | +1.04% |
| 2012 | 1,769 | −0.50% |
| 2017 | 1,745 | −0.27% |
| 2023 | 1,656 | −0.87% |
Source: INSEE

== Notable people ==
- Wynkyn de Worde (??-1534)
- Eugène Wintzweiller (1844–1870)

== Gallery ==
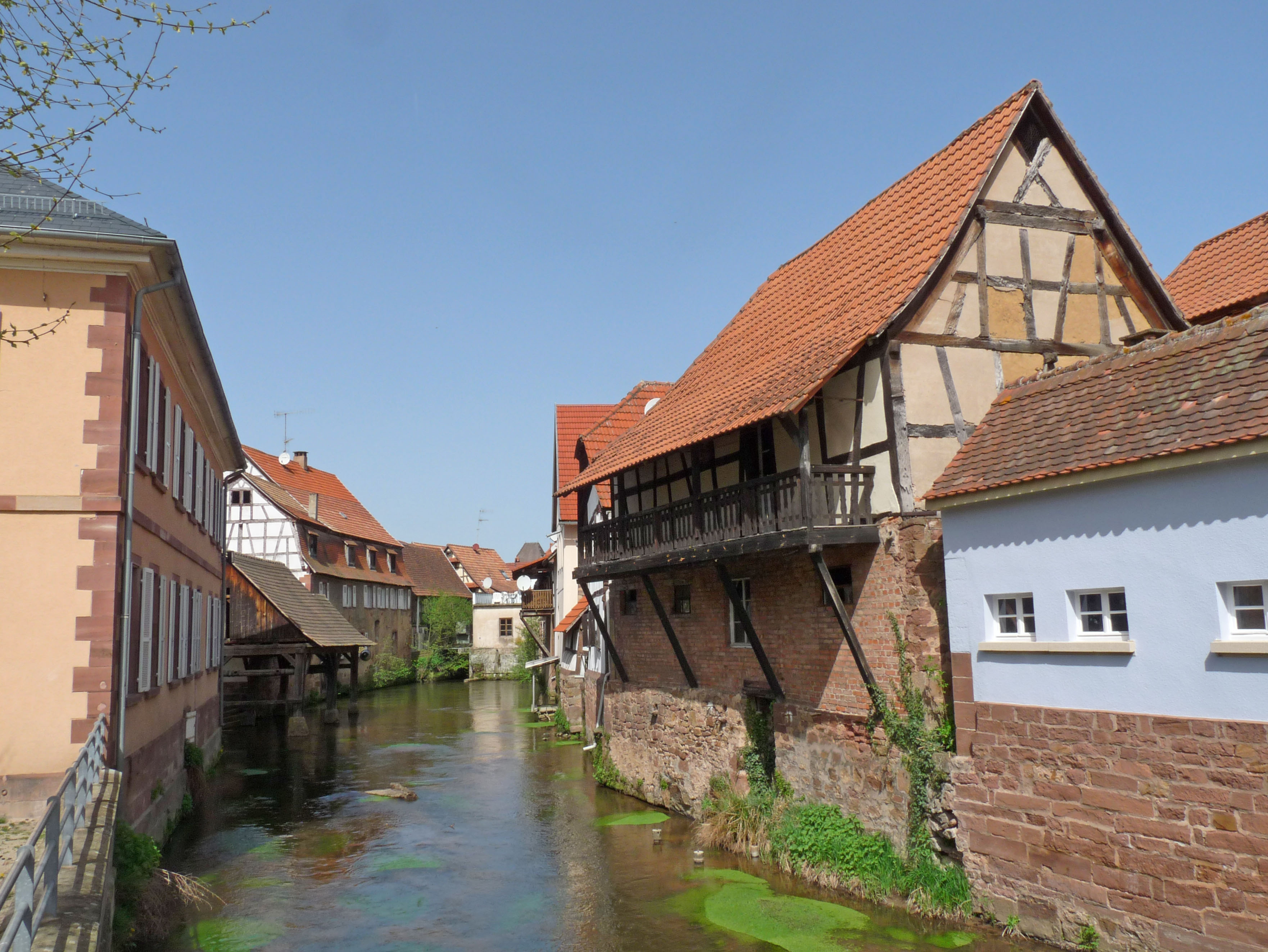
The River Sauer in Wœrth

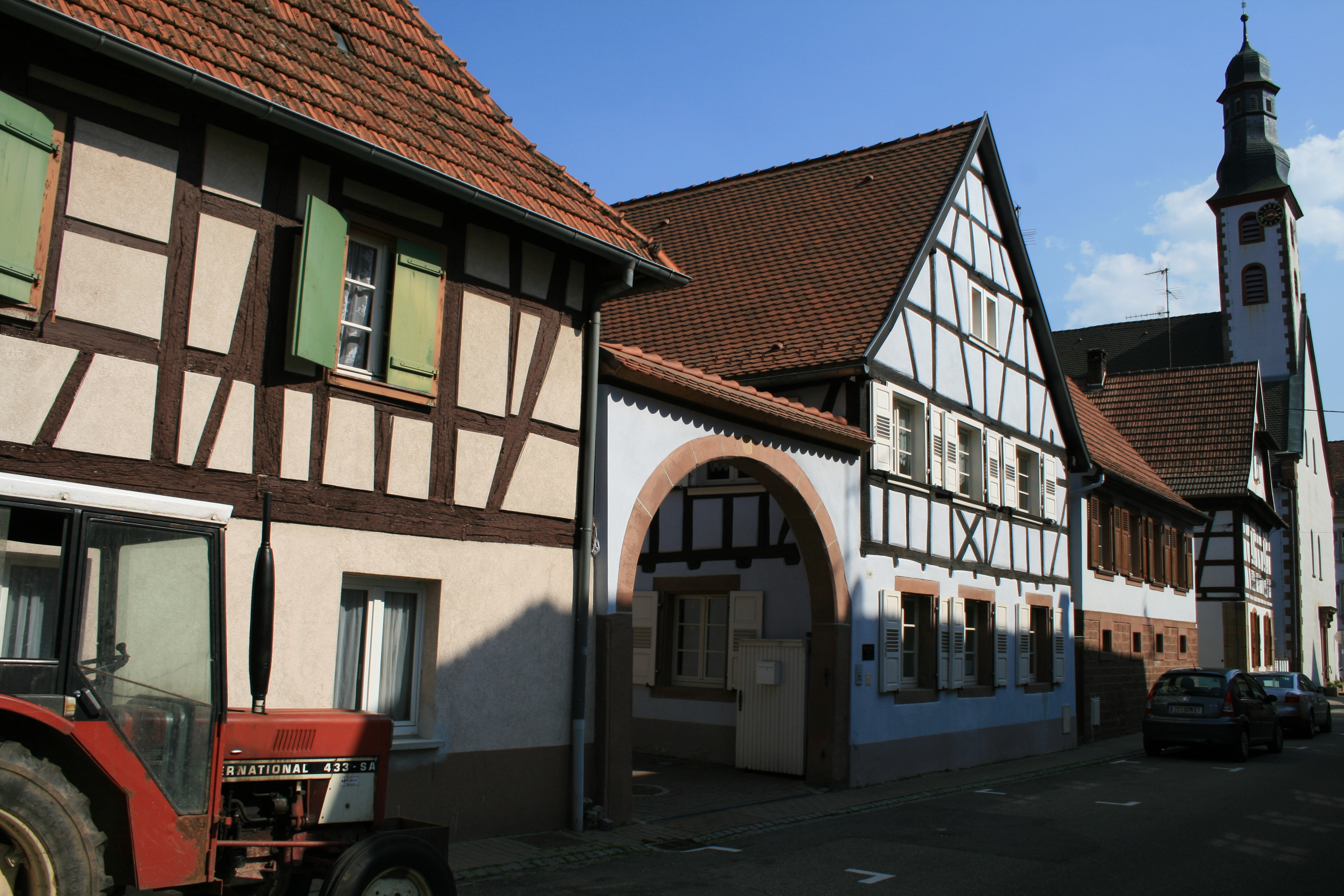
Buildings in the old part of the town

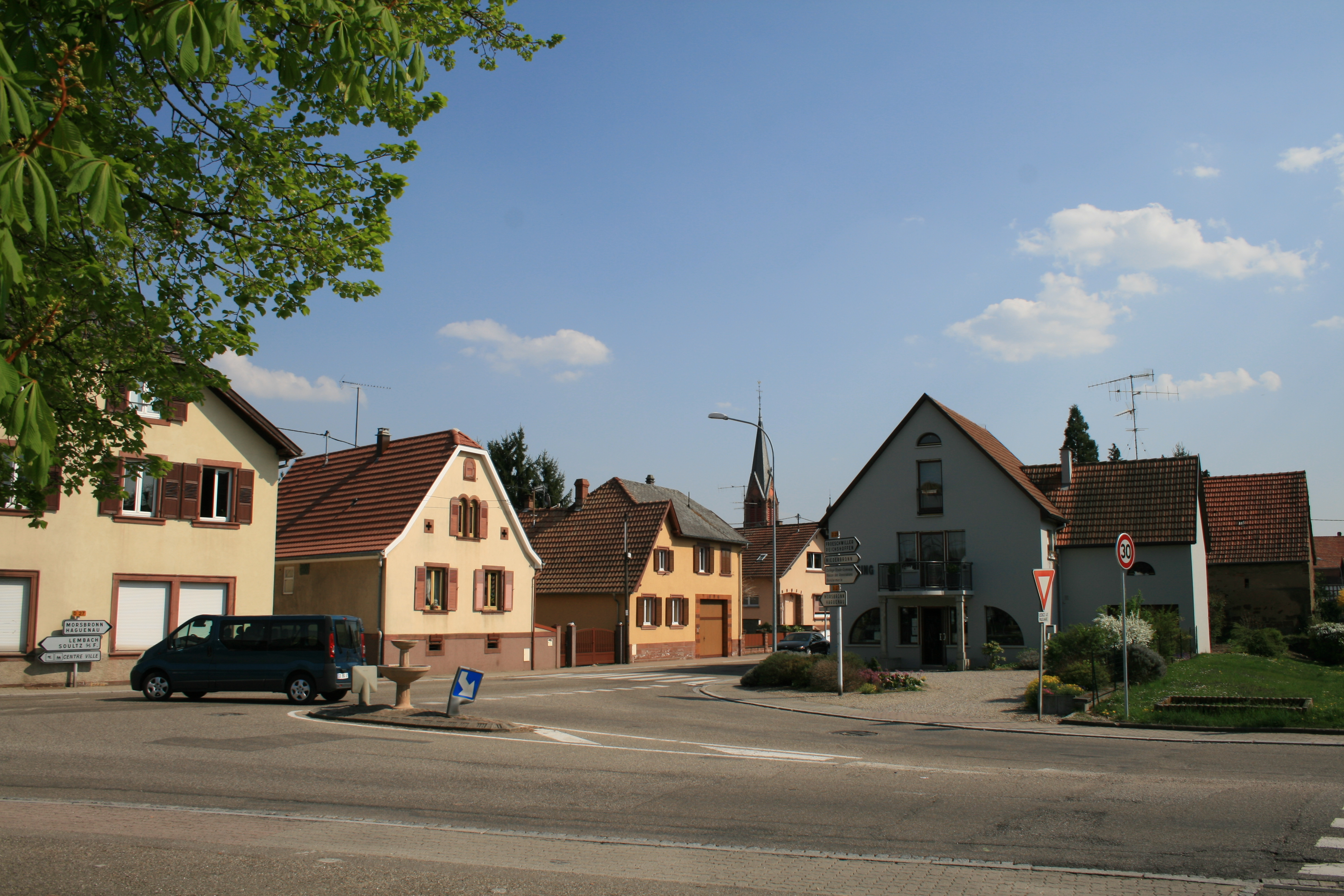
Houses on the west side of Wœrth

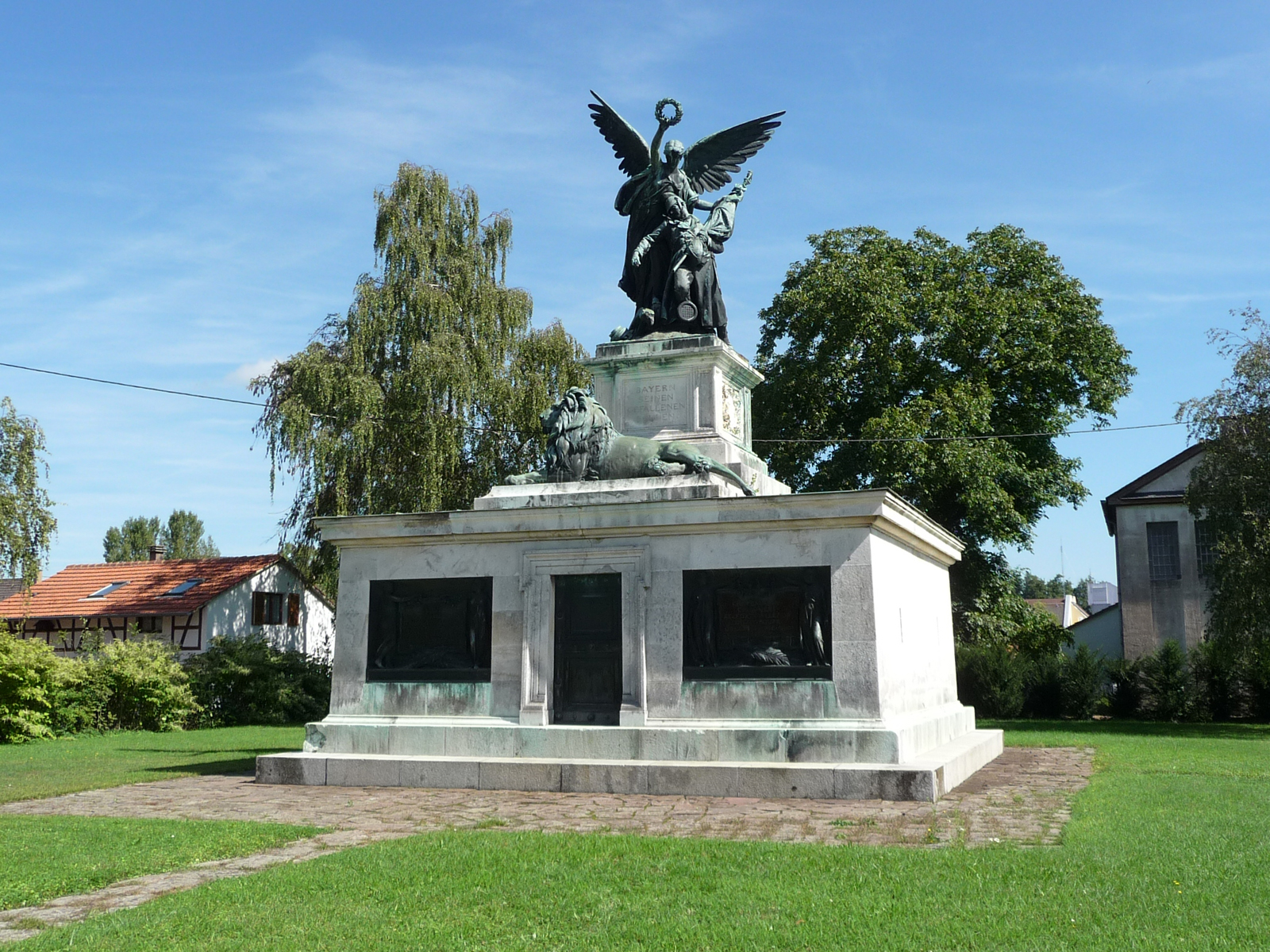
Bavarian battle memorial

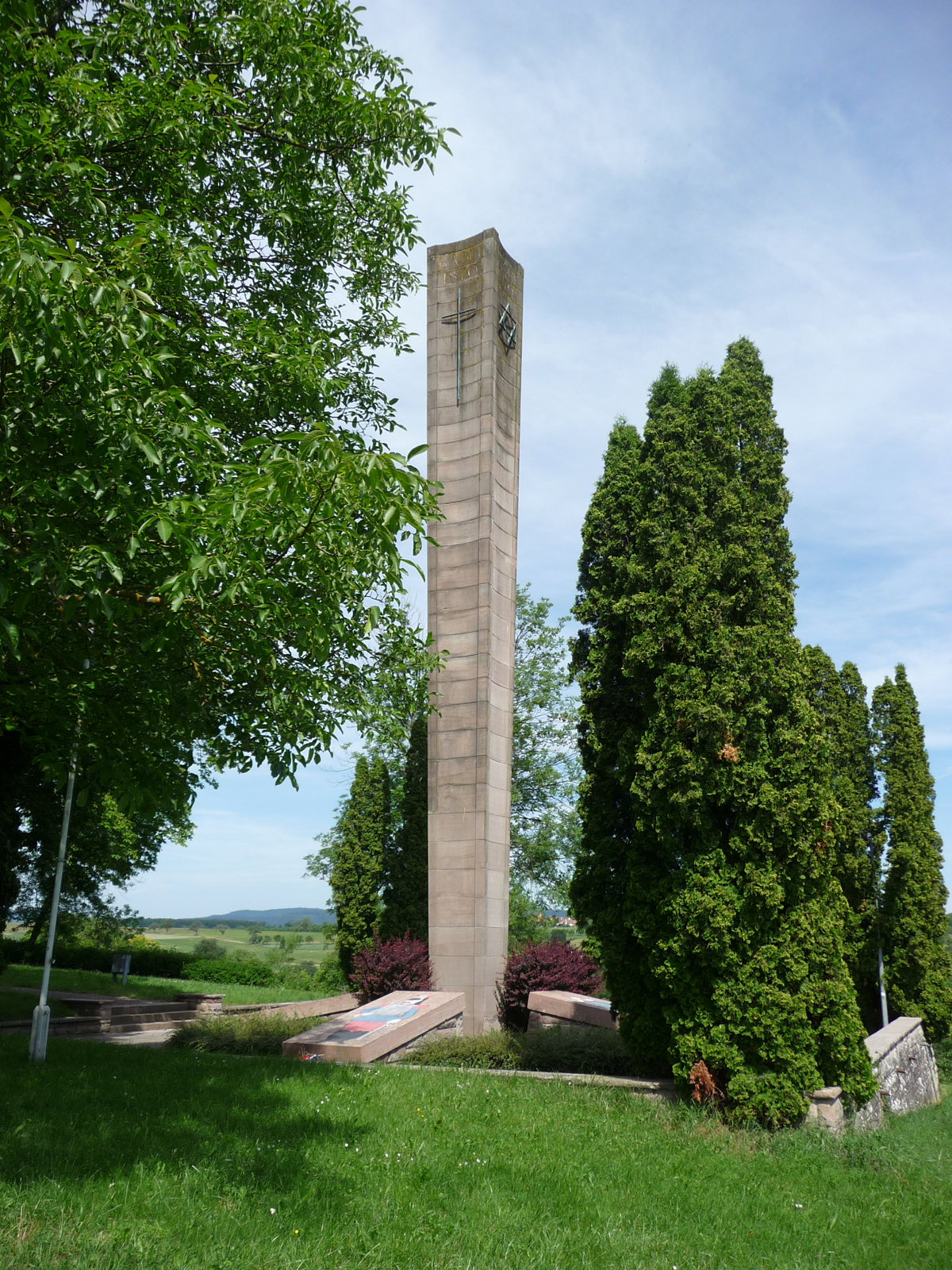
French battle memorial

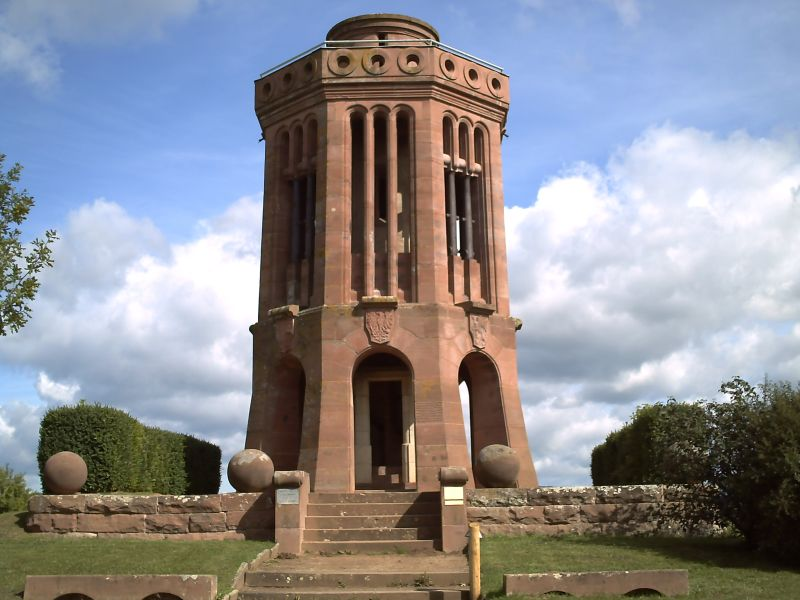
Hessian battlefield monument

== See also ==
- Communes of the Bas-Rhin department
