= Clément Lippacher =

French composer and organist (1850–1934)

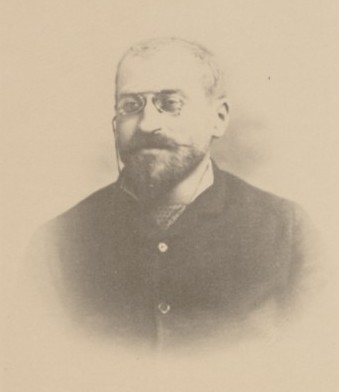
- Lippacher, in an undated photograph
- Born: 1850; Haguenau, Grand Est, France
- Died: 1934 (aged 83–84)
- Occupations: Composer; organist
- Style: Classical; plainsong

Clément Lippacher (1850–1934) was a French composer and organist.

== Life ==
Born in Haguenau, he was a student of Édouard Ignace Andlauer in Alsace, then at the École Niedermeyer de Paris. He won a second organ prize in 1868, a first runner-up prize in plainsong in 1869 and a second harmony prize in 1870.

He became an organist at the Saint-Eugène-Sainte-Cécile in Paris.

== Selected works ==
- 1882: Les Papillons, 2-act ballet by Holtzer, music by Raoul Pugno and Clément Lippacher
- 1883: la Vente de M. X...
- 1886: Viviane, ballet-féerie in five acts and six scenes, by Edmond Gondinet, music by Raoul Pugno and Clément Lippacher, premiered on 28 October 1886 at the Eden-Théâtre
- 1886: La Pension de Me Laicque, with Mengal
- 1886: Joséphine vendue par ses sœurs, 3-act opéra bouffe by Paul Ferrier and Fabrice Carré, music by Victor Roger (Note: According to Albert Carré, the music is entirely from Raoul Pugno's hand (source), according to Édouard Sitzmann, Lippacher is the composer (source). Philidor (Étienne Grosclaude) in Gil Blas writes that Victor Roger's name represents an important group of musicians, who have joined forces under this title to operate a three-act operetta. In the first line, Mr. Raoul Pugno and Mr. Lippacher are mentioned,source)) premiered in Paris, Théâtre des Bouffes-Parisiens, 20 March
- 1892: Le Christ, sacred drama, libretto by Charles Grandmougin, stage music by Lippacher
- 1892: Noël d'Alsace, libretto by Charles Grandmougin, stage music by Clément Lippacher

== Sources ==
- Jules Martin (1897). Nos auteurs et compositeurs dramatiques; Portraits et biographies (in French). Paris: Flammarion. p. 358.
