= Frederick of Büren =

11th-century count in northern Swabia

Frederick of Büren (fl. 1053) was a count in northern Swabia and an ancestor of the imperial Staufer dynasty.

The name Frederick of Büren is known only from the Tabula Consanguinitatis, a Staufer genealogy drawn up by the monk Wibald in the mid-12th century. Wibald writes that Frederick of Büren was the son of an unspecified Frederick and the father of Duke Frederick I of Swabia, "who built Stauf", the castle from which the family later took its name. Otto of Freising, in his Gesta of the Emperor Frederick Barbarossa, records that Duke Frederick I was descended "from the most noble counts of Swabia" without naming them.

Büren is usually identified with Wäschenbeuren and Frederick with the count of the same name who appears as a witness in a charter of 1053. Also appearing in that charter is the count palatine Frederick, who it is speculated may have been Frederick of Büren's father, since the title of count palatine in Swabia is later found with Frederick of Büren's second son, Louis. Wäschenbeuren lies not far from Stauf.

Frederick's stature in Swabia and neighbouring Alsace is proved by his advantageous marriage. He married Hildegard of Egisheim, a niece of Pope Leo IX. It is generally thought that the Staufer acquired Sélestat through this marriage. Besides the aforementioned sons, Frederick and Louis, Frederick and Hildegard had a son named Otto, who became bishop of Strasbourg, and a daughter named Adelaide, who was the mother of Bishop Otto of Bamberg.
