= Conrad Berg =

French composer, writer, and piano teacher

Conrad Mathias Berg (25 or 27 April 1785 – 13 or 14 December 1852) was a French composer, writer on music, and piano teacher from Alsace.

== Life ==
Berg was born in Colmar. After learning music and violin in his hometown, he spent the years 1804 and 1805 in Mannheim where he received lessons from Ferdinand Fränzl for this instrument. Although his father had intended him to be a violinist, Berg always preferred the piano. He went to Paris and entered the Conservatoire where he spent the years 1806–1807. According to other sources, Berg was admitted but did not enter. He moved to Strasbourg in 1808, where he taught music, and became known as a composer, writer and music critic. He concertised in Vienna (1817) and several times in Paris, the last time in 1851. In 1824, he travelled to Darmstadt to learn the teaching method of Christian Heinrich Rinck.

He has written works for piano (three concertos, sonatas, variations, ten piano trios, etc., four-handed pieces), four string quartets.

In 1832, Berg established the Société pour les artistes émérites et infirmes.

== Works ==
- "Trois grands trios pour le piano forte, violon et violoncelle : op. 20., n°8". 1819..
- Conrad Berg (1840). Aperçu historique sur l'état de la musique à Strasbourg pendant les cinquante dernières années. Strasbourg: Vve Levrault.
- Conrad Berg Hints upon a Rational Method of Instruction for Teachers of Music generally, with special Application to Piano Forte. (translated from German to English in 1843). Preface written by Gottfried Weber for the 3rd volume of The Musical Magazine.
