= Hohenstaufen =

Medieval German royal and imperial dynasty

Hohenstaufen Staufer
- Coat of arms (c. 1220) (Note: The earliest depictions of the Staufer arms show a single lion; for a short time augmented to two lions, and after 1196 three lions or leopards. The tincture or and sable is attested in 1220. The seal of Henry (VII) of Germany (1216) shows three leopards (passant guardant).)
- Country: Duchy of Swabia; Holy Roman Empire; Kingdom of Italy; Kingdom of Sicily; Kingdom of Jerusalem
- Founded: 1079; 947 years ago
- Founder: Frederick of Büren
- Final ruler: Conradin
- Titles: Duke of Swabia; King of Italy; Holy Roman Emperor; King of Sardinia; King of Sicily; King of Jerusalem; King of the Romans; King of Burgundy; Count of Burgundy; Judge of Logudoro
- Dissolution: 1318; 708 years ago
- Cadet branches: Bentivoglio family (claimed)

The Hohenstaufen dynasty (/ˈhoʊənʃtaʊfən/, US also /-staʊ-/, German: [ˌhoːənˈʃtaʊfn̩]), also known as the Staufer, was a noble family of German origin that rose to rule the Duchy of Swabia from 1079, and to royal rule in the Holy Roman Empire during the Middle Ages from 1138 until 1254. The dynasty's most prominent rulers – Frederick I (1155), Henry VI (1191) and Frederick II (1220) – ascended the imperial throne and also reigned over Italy and Burgundy. The non-contemporary name of "Hohenstaufen" is derived from the family's Hohenstaufen Castle on Hohenstaufen mountain at the northern fringes of the Swabian Jura, near the town of Göppingen. Under Hohenstaufen rule, the Holy Roman Empire reached its greatest territorial extent from 1155 to 1268.

== Name ==
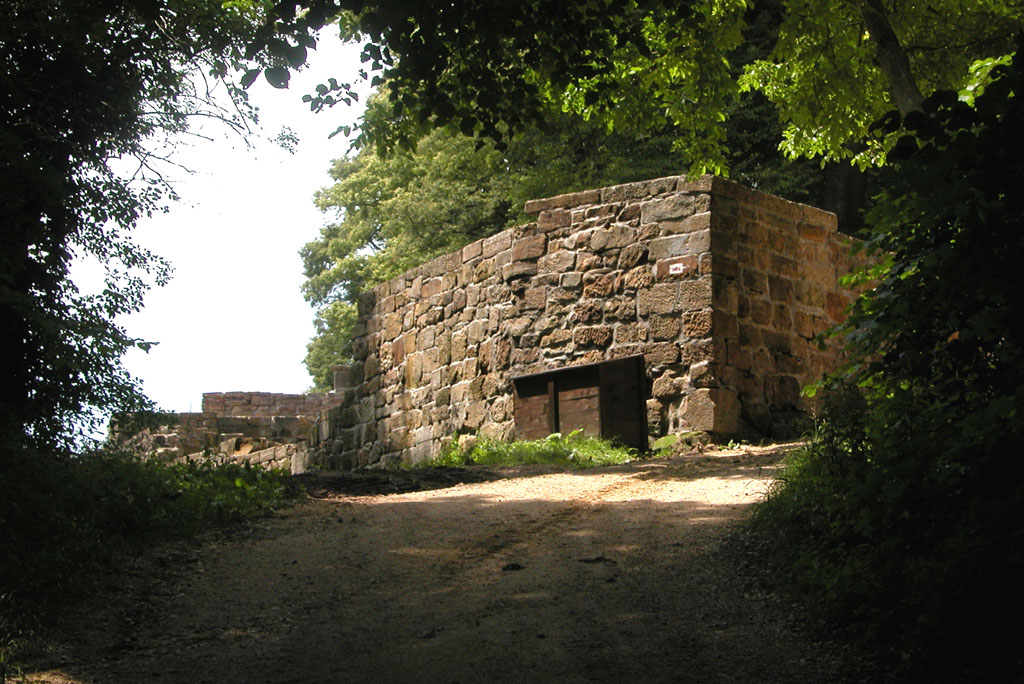
The Hohenstaufen Castle ruin

The name Hohenstaufen was first used in the 14th century to distinguish the "high" (hohen) conical hill named Staufen in the Swabian Jura (in the district of Göppingen) from the village of the same name in the valley below. The new name was applied to the hill castle of Staufen by historians only in the 19th century to distinguish it from other castles of the same name. The name of the dynasty followed suit, but in recent decades, the trend in German historiography has been to prefer the name "Staufer", which is closer to contemporary usage.

The name "Staufen" itself derives from Stauf (OHG stouf, akin to Early Modern English stoup), meaning "chalice". This term was commonly applied to conical hills in Swabia during the Middle Ages. It is a contemporary term for both the hill and the castle, although its spelling in the Latin documents of the time varies considerably: Sthouf, Stophe, Stophen, Stoyphe, Estufin, etc. The castle was built or at least acquired by Duke Frederick I of Swabia in the latter half of the 11th century.

Members of the family occasionally used the toponymic surname de Stauf or variants thereof. Only in the 13th century would the name come to be applied to the family as a whole. Around 1215, a chronicler referred to the "emperors of Stauf". In 1247, the Emperor Frederick II himself referred to his family as the domus Stoffensis (Staufer house), but this was an isolated instance. Otto of Freising (d. 1158) associated the Staufer with the town of Waiblingen, and around 1230, Burchard of Ursberg referred to the Staufer as of the "royal lineage of the Waiblingens" (regia stirps Waiblingensium). The exact connection between the family and Waiblingen is not clear, but as a name for the family, it became very popular. The pro-imperial Ghibelline faction of the Italian civic rivalries of the 13th and 14th centuries derived its name from Waiblingen.

In Italian historiography, the Staufer are known as the Svevi (Swabians).

== Origins ==
The origin remains unclear, however, Staufer counts are mentioned in a document of emperor Otto III in 987 as descendants of counts of the region of Riesgau near Nördlingen in the Duchy of Swabia, who were related to the Bavarian Sieghardinger family. A local count Frederick (d. about 1075) is mentioned as progenitor in a pedigree drawn up by Abbot Wibald of Stavelot at the behest of Emperor Frederick Barbarossa in 1153. He held the office of a Swabian count palatine; his son Frederick of Büren (c. 1020–1053) married Hildegard of Egisheim (d. 1094–1095), a niece of Pope Leo IX. Their son Frederick I was appointed Duke of Swabia at Hohenstaufen Castle by the Salian king Henry IV of Germany in 1079.

At the same time, Duke Frederick I was engaged to the king's approximately seventeen-year-old daughter, Agnes. Nothing is known about Frederick's life before this event, but he proved to be an imperial ally throughout Henry's struggles against other Swabian lords, namely Rudolf of Rheinfelden, Frederick's predecessor, and the Zähringen and Welf lords. Frederick's brother Otto was elevated to the Strasbourg bishopric in 1082.

Upon Frederick's death, he was succeeded by his son, Duke Frederick II, in 1105. Frederick II remained a close ally of the Salians; he and his younger brother Conrad were named the king's representatives in Germany when the king was in Italy. Around 1120, Frederick II married Judith of Bavaria from the rival House of Welf.

== Ruling in Germany ==
When the last male member of the Salian dynasty, Emperor Henry V, died without heirs in 1125, a controversy arose about the succession. Duke Frederick II and Conrad, the two current male Staufers, by their mother Agnes, were grandsons of late Emperor Henry IV and nephews of Henry V. Frederick attempted to succeed to the throne of the Holy Roman Emperor (formally known as the King of the Romans) through a customary election, but lost to the Saxon duke Lothair of Supplinburg. A civil war between Frederick's dynasty and Lothair's ended with Frederick's submission in 1134. After Lothair's death in 1137, Frederick's brother Conrad was elected King as Conrad III.

Because the Welf duke Henry the Proud, son-in-law and heir of Lothair and the most powerful prince in Germany, who had been passed over in the election, refused to acknowledge the new king, Conrad III deprived him of all his territories, giving the Duchy of Saxony to Albert the Bear and that of Bavaria to Leopold IV, Margrave of Austria. In 1147, Conrad heard Bernard of Clairvaux preach the Second Crusade at Speyer, and he agreed to join King Louis VII of France in a great expedition to the Holy Land which failed.

Conrad's brother Duke Frederick II died in 1147 and was succeeded in Swabia by his son, Duke Frederick III. When King Conrad III died without an adult heir in 1152, Frederick also succeeded him, taking both German royal and Imperial titles.

=== Frederick Barbarossa ===
Frederick I (Reign 2 January 1155 – 10 June 1190), known as Frederick Barbarossa because of his red beard, struggled throughout his reign to restore the power and prestige of the German monarchy against the dukes, whose power had grown both before and after the Investiture Controversy under his Salian predecessors. As royal access to the resources of the church in Germany was much reduced, Frederick was forced to go to Italy to find the finances needed to restore the king's power in Germany. He was soon crowned emperor in Italy, but decades of warfare on the peninsula yielded scant results. The Papacy and the prosperous city-states of the Lombard League in northern Italy were traditional enemies, but the fear of Imperial domination caused them to join ranks to fight Frederick. Under the skilled leadership of Pope Alexander III, the alliance suffered many defeats but ultimately was able to deny the emperor a complete victory in Italy. Frederick returned to Germany. He had vanquished one notable opponent, his Welf cousin, Duke Henry the Lion of Saxony and Bavaria in 1180, but his hopes of restoring the power and prestige of the monarchy seemed unlikely to be met by the end of his life.

During Frederick's long stays in Italy, the German princes became stronger and began a successful colonization of Slavic lands. Offers of reduced taxes and manorial duties enticed many Germans to settle in the east in the course of the Ostsiedlung. In 1163, Frederick waged a successful campaign against the Kingdom of Poland in order to re-install the Silesian dukes of the Piast dynasty. With the German colonization, the Empire increased in size and came to include the Duchy of Pomerania. A quickening economic life in Germany increased the number of towns and Imperial cities, and gave them greater importance. It was also during this period that castles and courts replaced monasteries as centers of culture. Growing out of this courtly culture, Middle High German literature reached its peak in lyrical love poetry, the Minnesang, and in narrative epic poems such as Tristan, Parzival, and the Nibelungenlied.

=== Henry VI ===
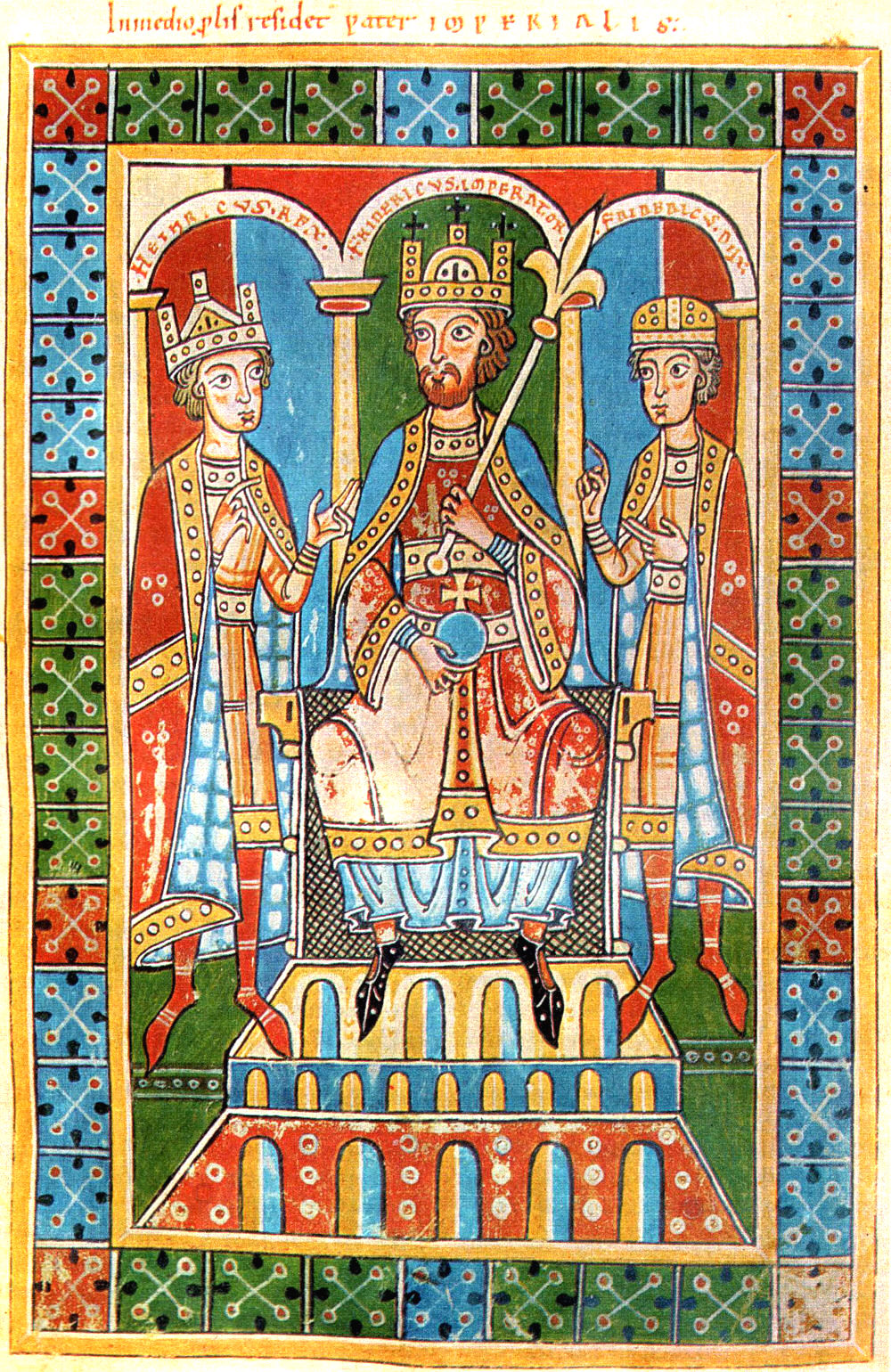
Emperor Frederick Barbarossa and his sons King Henry VI and Duke Frederick V of Swabia, Historia Welforum, 1167/79, Weingarten Abbey

Frederick died in 1190 while on the Third Crusade and was succeeded by his son, Henry VI. Elected king even before his father's death, Henry went to Rome to be crowned emperor. He married Princess Constance of Sicily, and deaths in his wife's family gave him claim of succession and possession of the Kingdom of Sicily in 1189 and 1194, respectively, a source of vast wealth. Henry failed to make royal and Imperial succession hereditary, but in 1196, he succeeded in gaining a pledge that his infant son Frederick would receive the German crown. Faced with difficulties in Italy and confident that he would realize his wishes in Germany at a later date, Henry returned to the south, where it appeared he might unify the peninsula under the Hohenstaufen name. After a series of military victories, however, he fell ill and died of natural causes in Sicily in 1197. His underage son Frederick could only succeed him in Sicily and Malta, while in the Empire, the struggle between the House of Staufen and the House of Welf erupted once again.

=== Philip of Swabia ===
Because the election of a three-year-old boy to be German king appeared likely to make orderly rule difficult, the boy's uncle, Duke Philip of Swabia, brother of the late Henry VI, was designated to serve in his place. Other factions however, favoured a Welf candidate. In 1198, two rival kings were chosen: the Hohenstaufen Philip of Swabia and the son of the deprived Duke Henry the Lion, the Welf Otto IV. A long civil war began; Philip was about to win when he was murdered by the Bavarian count palatine Otto VIII of Wittelsbach in 1208. Pope Innocent III initially had supported the Welfs, but when Otto, now sole elected monarch, moved to appropriate Sicily, Innocent changed sides and accepted young Frederick II and his ally, King Philip II of France, who defeated Otto at the 1214 Battle of Bouvines. Frederick had returned to Germany in 1212 from Sicily, where he had grown up, and was elected king in 1215. When Otto died in 1218, Frederick became the undisputed ruler and in 1220 was crowned Holy Roman Emperor.

Philip changed the coat of arms from a black lion on a gold shield to three leopards, probably derived from the arms of his Welf rival Otto IV.

== Ruling in Italy ==
The conflict between the Staufer dynasty and the Welf had irrevocably weakened the Imperial authority and the Norman kingdom of Sicily became the base for Staufer rule.

=== Frederick II ===
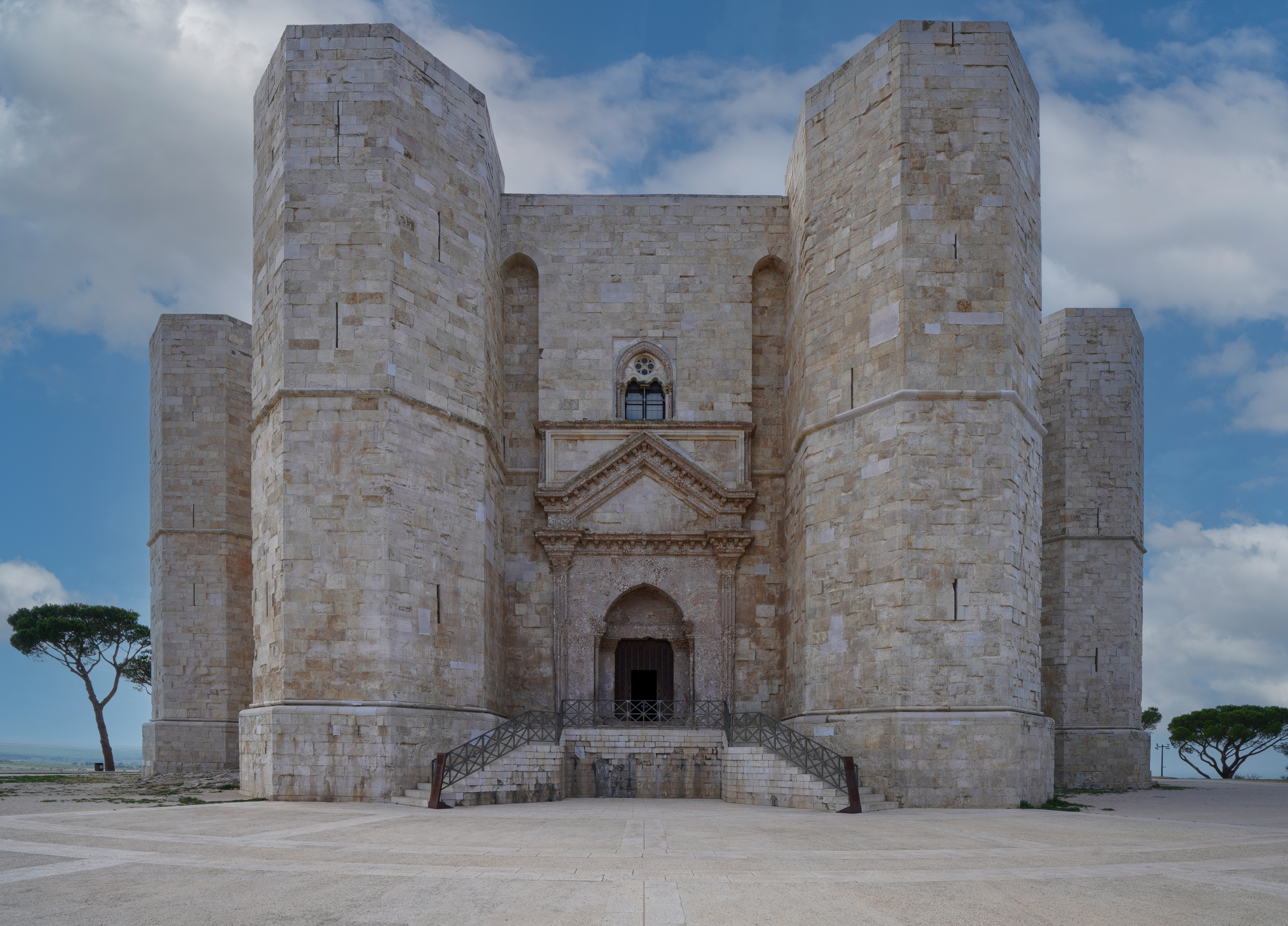
Frederick's Castel del Monte, in Andria, Apulia, Italy

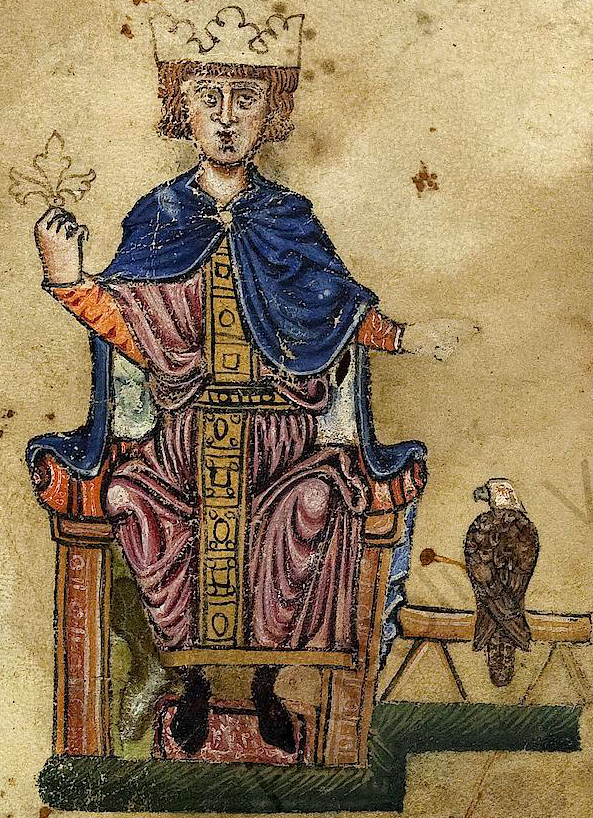
Frederick II with his falcon, from De arte venandi cum avibus, c. 1240, Vatican Library

The Holy Roman Empire at its greatest extent under Emperor Frederick II

Emperor Frederick II was the most brilliant and extraordinary of the Hohenstaufen but he spent little time in Germany. His main concerns lay in Italy and the Kingdom of Sicily, where he tried to rule as an absolute monarch supported by a sophisticated administrative apparatus. The institutions of Sicily and Italy seemed to be better political laboratories, more conducive to Frederick's remarkable brand of innovation and absolutist tendencies. He founded the University of Naples in 1224 to train future state officials and reigned over Germany primarily through the allocation of royal prerogatives, leaving the sovereign authority and imperial estates to the ecclesiastical and secular princes. In 1232, Henry (VII), King of Germany and Frederick's eldest son, was forced by the German princes to promulgate the Statutum in favorem principum ("statute in favor of princes"). Frederick II, embittered but aiming to promote cohesion in Germany in preparation for his campaigns in northern Italy, pragmatically agreed to Henry's confirmation of the charter. It was a charter of liberties for the leading German princes at the expense of the lesser nobility and the entirety of the commoners. The princes gained the whole power of jurisdiction and the power to strike their own coins. The emperor lost his right to establish new cities, castles and mints over their territories. The Statutum was more a confirmation of political realities which had existed for generations in Germany than a wholesale denuding of royal power and it did not prevent imperial officials from enforcing Frederick's prerogatives. The Statutum affirmed a division of labor between the emperor and the princes and laid much groundwork for the development of particularism and, perhaps even federalism in Germany. Even so, from 1232 the vassals of the emperor had a veto over imperial legislative decisions and any new law established by the emperor had to be approved by the princes. These provisions not withstanding, royal power in Germany remained strong under Frederick.

By the 1240s, the crown was almost as rich in fiscal resources, towns, castles, enfeoffed retinues, monasteries, ecclesiastical advocacies, manors, tolls, and all other rights, revenues, and jurisdictions as it had ever been at any time since the death of Henry VI. It is unlikely that a particularly "strong ruler" such as Frederick II would have even pragmatically agreed to legislation that was concessionary rather than cooperative, neither would the princes have insisted on such. Frederick II used the political loyalty and practical jurisdictions of the German aristocracy to support his kingly duty of imposing peace, order, and justice upon the German realm. This is shown clearly in the imperial Landfried issued at Mainz in 1235, which explicitly enjoined the princes as loyal vassals to exercise their own jurisdictions in their own localities. The jurisdictional autarky of the German princes was favoured by the crown itself in the twelfth and thirteenth centuries in the interests of order and local peace. The inevitable result was the territorial particularism of churchmen, lay princes, and interstitial cities. However, Frederick II was a ruler of vast territories and "could not be everywhere at once". The transference of jurisdiction was a practical solution to secure the further support of the German princes.

By the 1226 Golden Bull of Rimini, Frederick had assigned the military order of the Teutonic Knights to complete the conquest and conversion of the Prussian lands. A reconciliation with the Welfs took place in 1235, whereby Otto the Child, grandson of the late Saxon duke Henry the Lion, was named Duke of Brunswick and Lüneburg. The power struggle with the popes continued and resulted in Frederick's excommunication in 1227. In 1239, Pope Gregory IX excommunicated Frederick again, and in 1245, he was condemned as a heretic by a church council. Although Frederick II was perhaps one of the most energetic, imaginative, and capable rulers of the entire Middle Ages, he seemed to be less concerned with drawing the disparate forces in Germany together. Frederick was pragmatic enough to realize that for all his ability and power, his time and focus could only be fully concentrated either north or south of the Alps, where the bulk of his resources lay.

Frederick II's most profound legal legacy remains the Constitutions of Melfi promulgated in 1231 in the Kingdom of Sicily. The sophistication of the Constitutions or the Liber Augustalis set Frederick as perhaps the supreme lawgiver of the Middle Ages. The Constitutions drew upon decades of Siculo-Norman governmental tradition stretching back to his maternal grandfather, Roger II of Sicily. Almost every aspect in Frederick's tightly-governed kingdom was regulated, from a rigorously centralized judiciary and bureaucracy, to commerce, coinage, financial policy, weights and measures, legal equality for all citizens, protections for women, and even provisions for the environment and public health. Per the Constitutions, Frederick II was lex animata and ruled as an absolute monarch. The Constitutions have been regarded as perhaps the "birth certificate" of the modern continental European state.

From 1240, Frederick II was determined to push through far-reaching reforms to establish the Sicilian kingdom and Imperial Italy as a unified state bound by a centralized administration. The new unified administration was taken over directly by the emperor and his highly trained Sicilian officials whose jurisdiction now ranged across all of Italy. For the rest of Frederick’s reign, there was a continuous movement toward the extension and perfection of this new unified administrative system, with the emperor himself as the driving force. Despite his mighty efforts, however, Frederick's unified Italian state proved ephemeral after his death. The vicars and captains-general provided the prototype for the great signori who dominated Italy in later generations, each a petty sovereign in Frederick's image — some even continued to claim the title of imperial vicar.

By the time of Frederick's death in 1250, the crown in Germany was still formidable and Conrad IV, Frederick's eldest surviving legitimate son and heir, enjoyed a strong position. However, after Conrad's death in 1254, the Great Interregnum followed which saw several rival claimants elected as King of the Romans in Germany. None of these claimants was able to achieve any position of authority, much less the power and imperial grandeur of the Hohenstaufen. The German princes vied for individual advantage and managed to strip many powers away from the diminished monarchy. Rather than establish sovereign states, however, many nobles tended to look after their families. Their many male heirs created more and smaller estates, and from a largely free class of officials previously formed, many of these assumed or acquired hereditary rights to administrative and legal offices. These trends compounded political fragmentation within Germany. The period was ended in 1273 with the election of Rudolph of Habsburg, a godson of Frederick.

=== End of the Staufer dynasty ===
Conrad IV was succeeded as duke of Swabia by his only son, two-year-old Conradin. By this time, the office of duke of Swabia had been fully subsumed into the office of the king, and without royal authority had become meaningless. In 1261, attempts to elect young Conradin king were unsuccessful. He also had to defend Sicily against an invasion, sponsored by Pope Urban IV (Jacques Pantaléon) and Pope Clement IV (Guy Folques), by Charles of Anjou, a brother of the French king. Charles had been promised by the popes the Kingdom of Sicily, where he would replace the relatives of Frederick II. Charles had defeated Conradin's uncle Manfred, King of Sicily, in the Battle of Benevento on 26 February 1266. The king himself, refusing to flee, rushed into the midst of his enemies and was killed. Conradin's campaign to retake control ended with his defeat in 1268 at the Battle of Tagliacozzo, after which he was handed over to Charles, who had him publicly executed at Naples. With Conradin, the direct line of the Dukes of Swabia finally ceased to exist, though most of the later emperors were descended from the Staufer dynasty indirectly.

The last member of the dynasty was Manfred's son, Henry [Enrico], who died in captivity at Castel dell'Ovo on 31 October 1318. (Note: Manfred of Sicily was himself a son of Frederick II born out of wedlock, who had been legitimised by the posterior marriage of his parents on his mother's deathbed. Therefore, his son, Henry [Enrico] (May 1262 – 31 October 1318), was the last Hohenstaufen who could have claimed full dynastic rights, albeit not being the last agnatic descendant of the family. In fact, the last patrilineal descendant was Henry's first cousin once removed, Giovanna di Stevia (1280–1352), a daughter of Conrad, and grand-daughter of Frederick of Antioch, also an illegitimate son of Frederick II.)

During the political decentralization of the late Staufer period, the population had grown from an estimated 8 million in 1200 to about 14 million in 1300, and the number of towns increased tenfold. The most heavily urbanized areas of Germany were in the south and the west. Towns often developed a degree of independence, but many were subordinate to local rulers if not immediate to the emperor. Colonisation of the east also continued in the thirteenth century, most notably through the efforts of the Teutonic Knights. German merchants also began trading extensively on the Baltic.

== Legacy ==
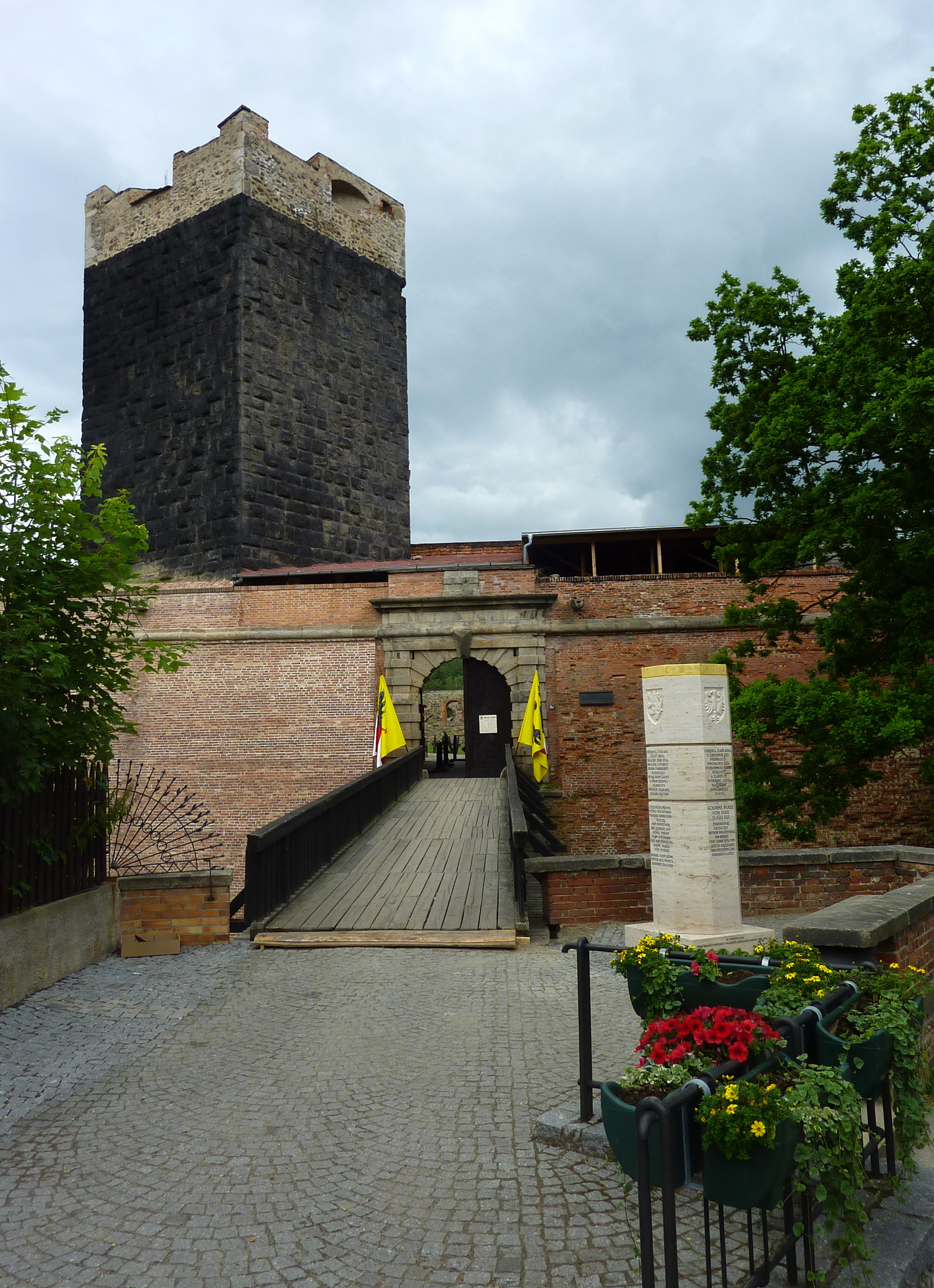
A Staufer stele in Cheb, Czech Republic (2013)

The Kyffhäuser Monument was erected to commemorate Frederick I and was inaugurated in 1896. The Hohenstaufen arms were adopted by the German state of Baden-Württemberg in 1954. On 29 October 1968, the 700th anniversary of the death of Konradin, a society known as "Society for Staufer History" (de) was founded in Göppingen.

The Castel del Monte, Apulia, which was built during the 1240s by the Emperor Frederick II, was designated as a World Heritage Site in 1996.

The German artist, Hans Kloss, painted his Staufer-Rundbild depicting, in great detail, the history of the House of Hohenstaufen, in Lorch Monastery.

From 2000 to 2018, the Committee of Staufer Friends (de) has built thirty-eight Staufer steles (de) in Germany, France, Italy, Austria, Czech Republic and the Netherlands.

== Members of the Hohenstaufen family ==
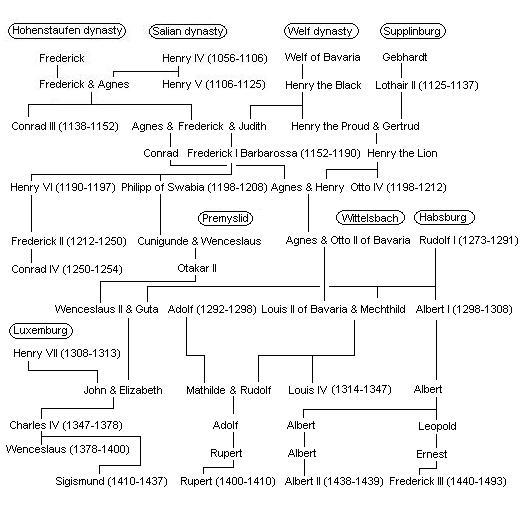
Family tree of the Hohenstaufen emperors including their relation to succeeding dynasties

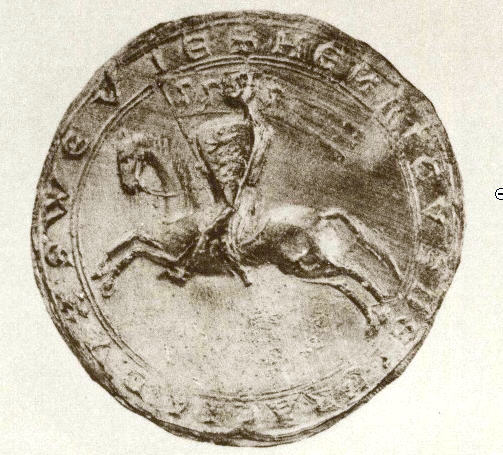
Seal of Henry II of Swabia (dated 1216) shows him as a mounted knight with a shield and banner displaying three leopards (three lions passant guardant)as the Hohenstaufen coat of arms; the three lions (later shown just passant) would later become known as the Swabian coat of arms.

=== Holy Roman Emperors and Kings of the Romans ===
- Conrad III, king 1138–1152
- Frederick Barbarossa, king 1152–1190, emperor after 1155
- Henry VI, king 1190–1197, emperor after 1191
- Philip of Swabia, king 1198–1208
- Frederick II, king 1208–1250, emperor after 1220
- Henry (VII), king 1220–1235 (under his father Emperor Frederick II)
- Conrad IV, king 1237–1254 (until 1250 under his father Emperor Frederick II)

The first ruling Hohenstaufen, Conrad III, like the last one, Conrad IV, was never crowned emperor. After a 20-year period (Great interregnum 1254–1273), the first Habsburg was elected king.

=== Kings of Italy ===
Note: The following kings are already listed above as German Kings:

- Conrad III 1128–1135
- Frederick I 1154–1190
- Henry VI 1191–1197

=== Kings of Sicily ===
Arms of the Hohenstaufen Sicily

Note: Some of the following kings are already listed above as German Kings:

- Henry VI 1194–1197
- Frederick 1198–1250
  - Henry (VII) 1212–1217 (nominal king under his father)
- Conrad 1250–1254
- Conradin 1254–1258/1268
- Manfred 1258–1266
- Constance II (Queen) 1282–1285

=== Dukes of Swabia ===
Note: Some of the following dukes are already listed above as German Kings:

- Frederick I, Duke of Swabia (Friedrich) (r. 1079–1105)
- Frederick II, Duke of Swabia (r. 1105–1147)
- Frederick I, Holy Roman Emperor (Frederick III of Swabia)(r. 1147–1152) King in 1152 and Holy Roman Emperor in 1155
- Frederick IV, Duke of Swabia (r. 1152–1167)
- Frederick V, Duke of Swabia (r. 1167–1170)
- Frederick VI, Duke of Swabia (r. 1170–1191)
- Conrad II, Duke of Swabia (r. 1191–1196)
- Philip of Swabia (r. 1196–1208) King in 1198
- Frederick II, Holy Roman Emperor (r. 1212–1216) King in 1212 and Holy Roman Emperor in 1220
- Henry (VII) of Germany (r. 1216–1235), King 1220–1235
- Conrad IV (r. 1235–1254) King in 1237
- Conrad V (Conradin) (r. 1254–1268)

== Family tree of the House of Hohenstaufen ==
Simplified Hohenstaufen Dynasty family tree

Frederick of Büren
Frederick I duke of Swabia | Agnes of Waiblingen; SALIAN
Frederick II duke of Swabia | 1.Judith of Bavaria; 2.Agnes of Saarbrücken | Conrad III king of Germany | 1.Gertrude of Comburg; 2.Gertrude of Sulzbach
1.Adelaide of Vohburg; 2.Beatrice I, Countess of Burgundy | Frederick I Barbarossa king of Germany, III as duke of Swabia | Conrad count palatine of the Rhine | 1.(daughter of Gottfried I of Sponheim); 2.Irmengard of Henneberg | Henry Berengar co-king of Germany | Frederick IV duke of Swabia ⚭ Gertrude of Bavaria
Frederick V duke of Swabia | Henry VI king of Germany ⚭ Constance, Queen of Sicily | Frederick VI duke of Swabia | Otto I count of Burgundy ⚭ Margaret, Countess of Blois | Conrad II duke of Swabia ⚭ Berengaria of Castile | Philip king of Germany, duke of Swabia ⚭ Irene Angelina
Frederick II king of Germany, I as king of Sicily, VII as duke of Swabia | 1.Constance of Aragon; 2.Isabella II of Jerusalem; 3.Isabella of England; 4.Bianca Lancia
Henry king of Germany, II duke of Swabia, III King of Sicily, Italy, ⚭ Margaret of Austria | Conrad IV king of Germany, I as king of Sicily, III as duke of Swabia ⚭ Elisabeth of Bavaria | (Constance) Anna ⚭ John III Doukas Vatatzes; Roman Emperor | Manfred king of Sicily | 1.Beatrice of Savoy; 2.Helena; Angelina Doukaina of Epirus
Conradin; II as king of Sicily, IV as duke of Swabia | Constance ⚭ Peter III of Aragon

Detailed Hohenstaufen Dynasty family tree

The colors denote the monarchs from the Houses of:

- Hohenstaufen (1138–1208; 1215–1254)

- Süpplinburg (1125–1137)

- Welf (1208–1215)

Lothair II; King of Germany; 1075–1137 r.1125–1137 HRE r.1133–1137 | Richenza of Northeim c.1087/1089– 1141 | Henry IX; Duke of Bavaria; 1075–1126 r.1120–1126 | Frederick I Duke of Swabia; 1050–1105 r.1079–1105 | Agnes of Germany; 1072–1143 | Leopold III; Mgve of Austria; 1073–1136 r.1095–1136
Gertrude; 1115–1143 | Henry X the Proud; Duke of Bavaria c.1108–1139 | Judith of Bavaria; 1103–1131 | Frederick II; Duke of Swabia; 1090–1147 r.1105–1147 | Agnes of Saarbrücken d. c.1147 | Gertrude of Comburg d.1130/1131 | Conrad III; King of Germany; 1093–1152 r.1138–1152 | Gertrude of Sulzbach c.1110–1146
Henry the Lion; Duke of Bavaria; 1129–1195 | Matilda of England; 1156–1189 | Matthias I Duke of Lorraine; 1119–1176 r.1138–1176 | Bertha; 1123–1195 | Adelaide of Vohburg; 1135–1190 | Frederick I Barbarossa; King of Germany; 1122–1190 r.1152–1190 HRE r.1155–1190 | Beatrice I Css. of Burgundy; 1143–1184 r.1148–1184 | Conrad; Count Palatine of the Rhine; 1135–1195 r.1156–1195 | Judith of Hohenstaufen ≈1133–1191 | Henry; Berengar; King of Germany; 1136–1150 r.1147–1150> | Frederick IV; Duke of Swabia; 1145–1167 r.1152–1167
Irene; Angelina c.1181–1208 | Philip of Swabia; King of Germany; 1177–1208 r.1198–1208 | Beatrice; 1162–1174 | William II the Good; King of Sicily; 1155–1189 r.1166–1189 | Frederick V Duke of Swabia; 1164–1170 r.1167–1170 | Frederick VI; Duke of Swabia; 1167–1191 r.1170–1191 | Joan I Css. of Burgundy; 1191–1205 r.1200–1205 | Otto I Ct of Burgundy btw.1167/1171 –1200 r.1190–1200 | Beatrice II; Css. of Burgundy; 1193–1231 r.1205–1231 | Conrad II; Duke of Swabia; 1173–1196 r.1191–1196
Otto IV; King of Germany; 1175–1218 r.1198–1209 HRE r.1209–1215 | Beatrice of Swabia; 1198–1212 | Kunigunde of Swabia; 1202–1248 | Wenceslaus; I King of Bohemia ≈1205–1253; 1230–1253 | Renaud; 1173 | Henry VI; King of Germany; 1165–1197 r.1169–1197 HRE r.1191–1197 | Constance; Queen of Sicily; 1154–1198 r.1194–1198 | William; 1176 | Agnes; 1181–1184 | Gisela; 1168–1184
Henry II; Duke of Brabant; 1207–1248 r.1235–1248 | Maria of Swabia; 1201–1235 | Elisabeth of Swabia; 1205–1235 | Ferdinand III; King of Castile; 1199/1201–1252 | Constance of Aragon; 1179–1222 | Frederick II; King of Germany; 1194–1250 r.1212–1250 HRE r.1220–1250 | Isabella II; Queen of Jerusalem; 1212–1228 | Isabella of England; 1214–1241
Margaret of Austria c.1204–1266 | Henry (VII); King of Germany; 1211–1242 r.1220–1235 | Elisabeth of Bavaria c.1227–1273 | Conrad IV (of Sicily); King of Germany; 1228–1254 r.1237–1254 | Margareta; 1226–1227 | Henry; Otto; 1238–1253 | Margaret of Sicily; 1241–1270 | Albert II; Mgve. of Meissen; 1240–1314 r.1288–1314
Conradin; K. of Jerusalem; 1252–1268 r.1254–1268 | Frederick I Mgve of Meissen; 1257–1323 r.1292–1323

Notes:
For further detailed dynastic relationships, see also Family tree of the German monarchs.

== See also ==
- Dukes of Swabia family tree
- Guelphs and Ghibellines
