= St. George's Church, Sélestat =

Coordinates: 48.26°N 7.4567°E

- Église Saint-Georges de Sélestat
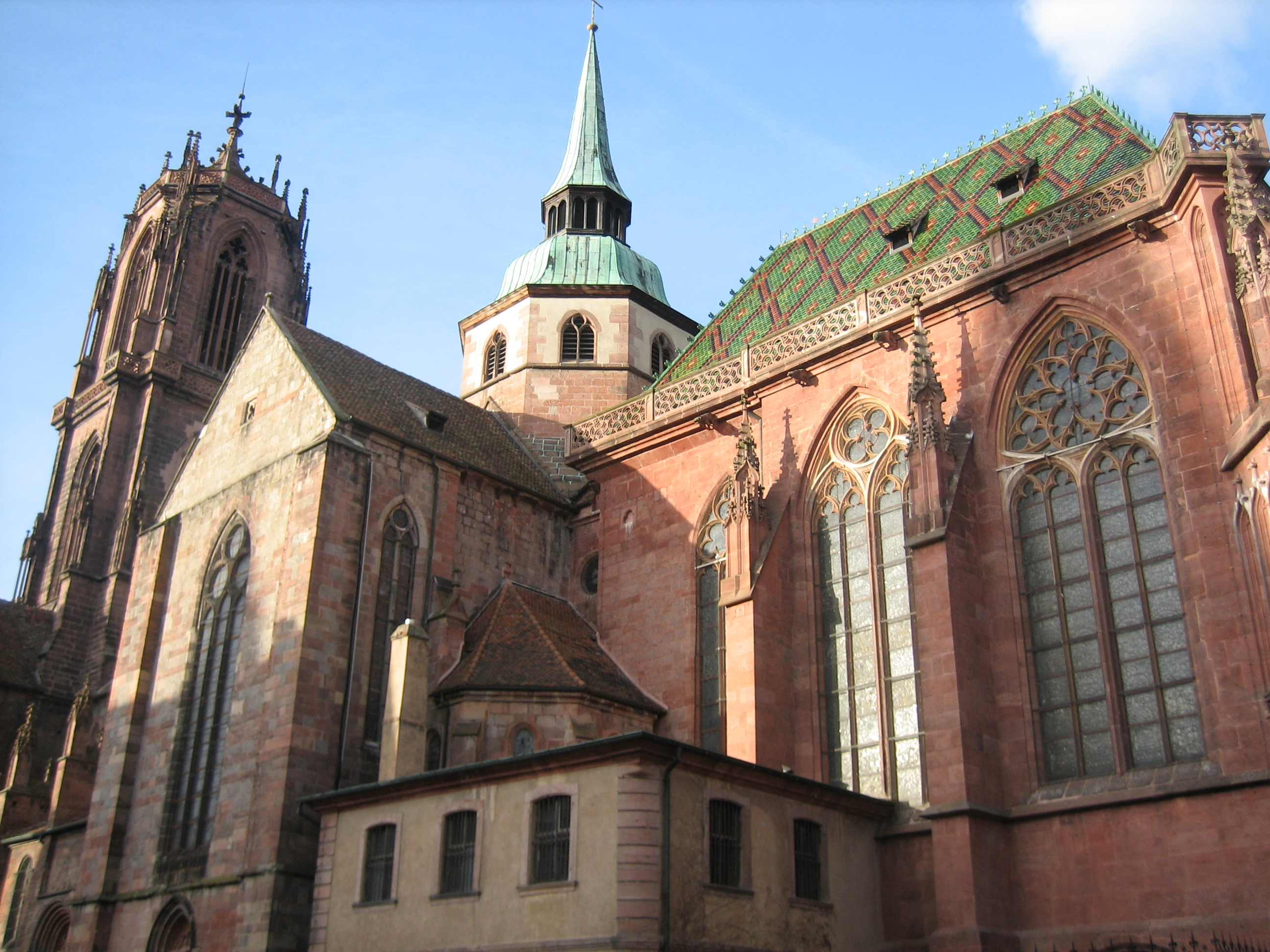
- St. George's Church, Sélestat
- Location: Sélestat
- Country: France
- Denomination: Roman Catholic

History
- Founded: 1230

Architecture
- Heritage designation: Monument historique
- Designated: 1848
- Style: Gothic
- Completed: 1490

Specifications
- Length: 64.85 m (212.8 ft)
- Width: 18.70 m (61.4 ft) (inside)
- Height: 60 m (200 ft)

Administration
- Archdiocese: Strasbourg

St. George's Church, Sélestat, is a Gothic church in Sélestat (formerly Schlettstadt), Bas-Rhin, Alsace, France. The church, of exceptional size and quality, is near the Humanist Library, which was founded in 1452 by Jean de Westhuss, priest at the church of St. George's. Originally dedicated to the Blessed Virgin Mary, the church has been named after Saint George since 1500 and is famous for its Christmas trees hung since 1521

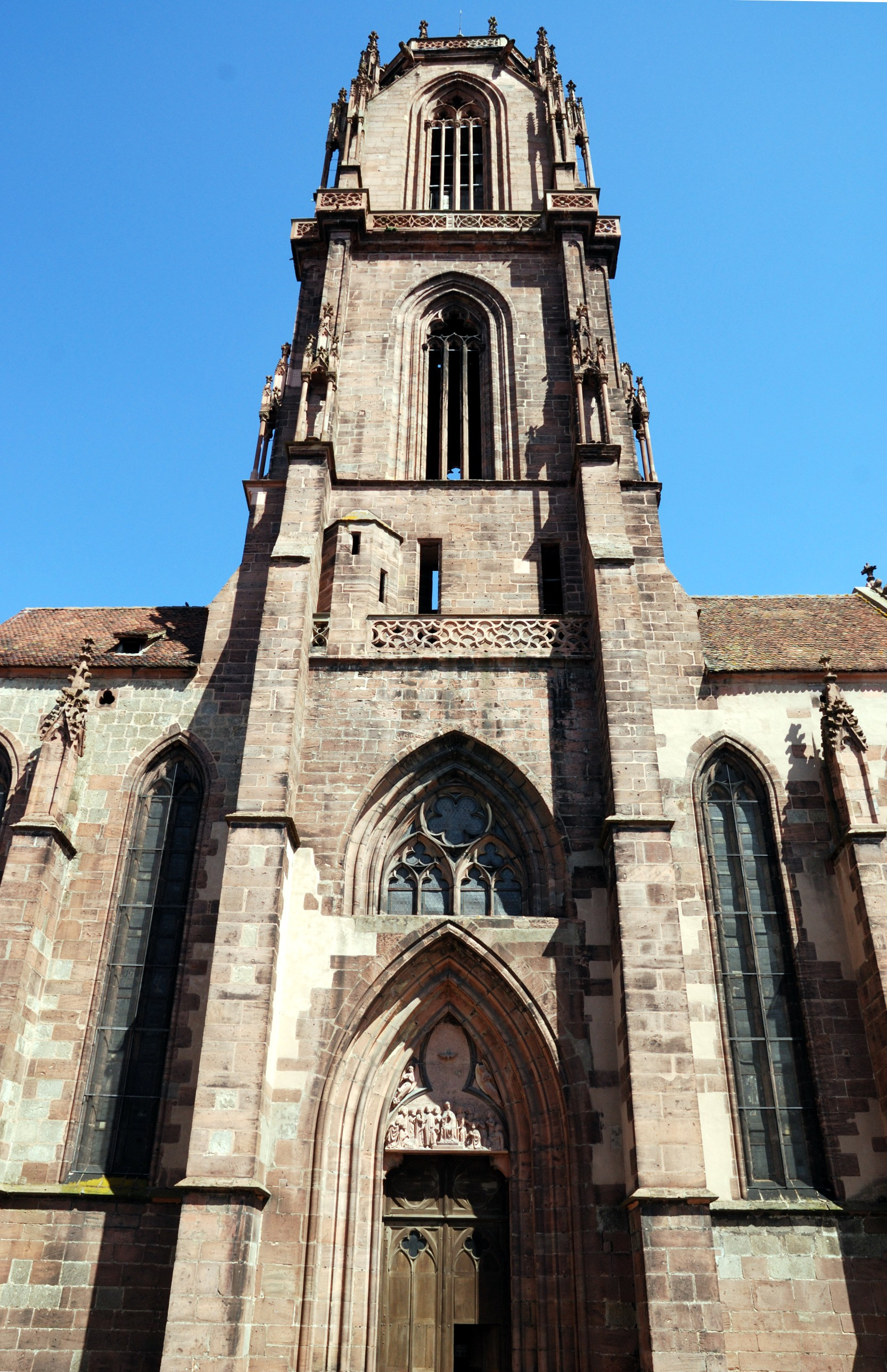
The Gothic façade

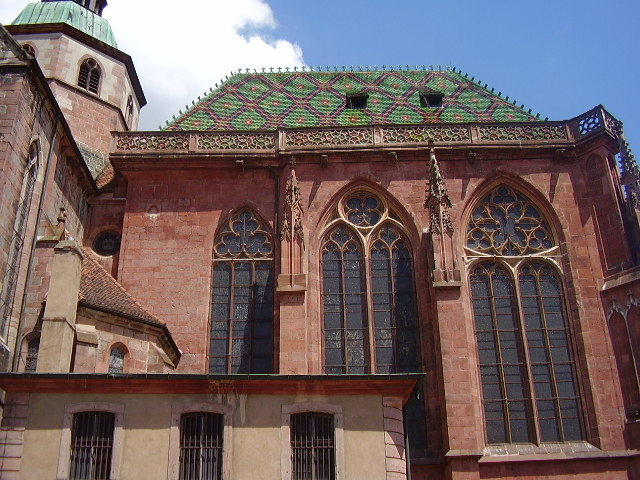
Lateral view of the choir

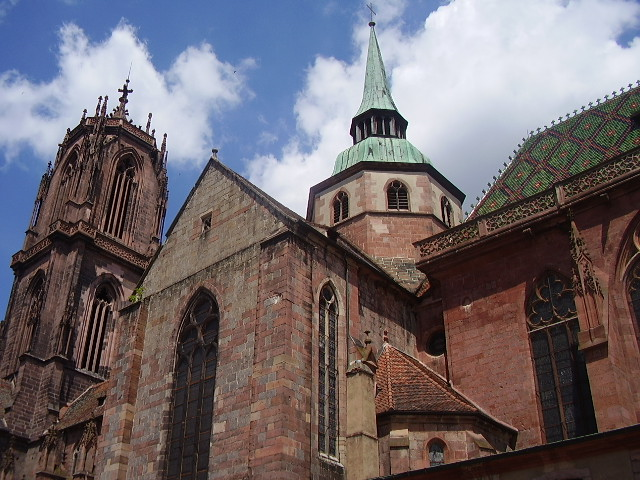
Lateral view of St. George's Church looking to the steeple

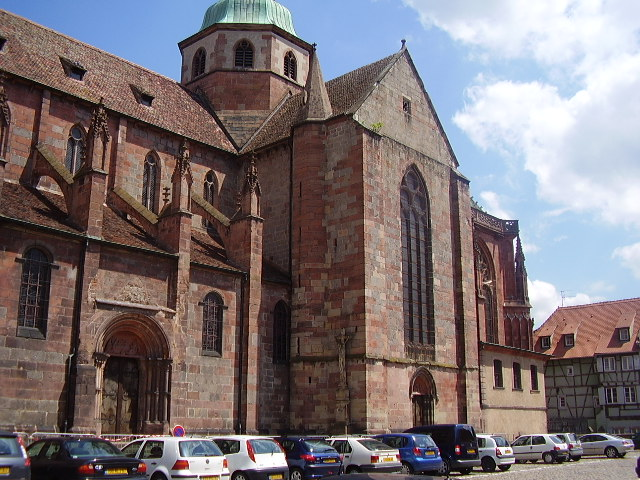
The transept of St. George's Church

== Construction (8th–15th century) ==
The building was first mentioned in records from the eighth century and was originally a baptismal chapel in the imperial palace built by Charlemagne, which the emperor is believed to have visited at Christmas in the year 775. The church stands on the remains of a large rotunda, partially cleared during excavations in the crypt in 1876 and 1902. Most of the Gothic basilica was built by Sélestat traders, a few metres from the Romanesque church of the priory of Sainte-Foy, the earlier church of the town, and its construction may be held to mark the growing wealth and independence of the merchant classes. Building of the new church — on a Latin cross groundplan with three aisles and a transept — started around 1220 and continued without interruption until the early fifteenth century. The side aisles were built during the first year, and the nave itself was raised in 1235.

The west end was constructed in the early fourteenth century. Similarly, the west tower, topped with an octagon with pinnacles, is dated to the fourteenth century, although the work was interrupted during this century. The construction of three large choir spans began at the end of the fourteenth century.

Three architects were involved in this work. The first was John Obrecht, Mayor of Schlettstatt in 1401 and the second was Matthis, between 1400 and 1410. But the most famous was the third, Erhart Kindelin, who probably built the three bays of the apse between 1415 and 1422. The construction of the tower continued during the fifteenth century and a rood screen was built in 1489 and 1490 by Conrad Sifer, but was destroyed during the French Revolution.

A door on the north wall of the transept was formed in the fifteenth century. A relief carved on the reverse is the veil of Saint Veronica, showing nails and the Holy Face. This relief could also be the work of Conrad Sifer. A staircase mounting the height of the nave bears the date 1615, the name of "Stéphane Exstel" and a stonecutter's mark. Many other stonecutters' marks are also found throughout the building.

The church was declared an historical monument by decree of 16 March 1848.

== Portals ==
A first gate, dating from the second half of the thirteenth century, has its mediaeval strap hinges still visible. The arched tympanum was carved in 1844 by Emile Sichler, a local sculptor. The Adoration of the Magi is represented on the tympanum, and oak leaves and vines are carved on the capitals of the columns. A second portal is dated to the construction of the nave, around 1220–1230; the doors and hinges are mediaeval, and vine leaves and grapes adorn the door. A third portal, which is Romanesque, probably comes from the nave and transept, built in the thirteenth century. It was probably moved to this location at a later date unknown. Mediaeval door hinges are visible, as well as stonecutters' marks. The tympanum, with round arches, is adorned with a carved decoration in bas-relief featuring oak leaves and vines.

A fourth portal was built around 1320. Its tympanum is broken, and the splayed arch is decorated with sculptures, replacing those destroyed during the Revolution, by Sichler in 1847. A first draft for the tympanum depicted Christ on the Mount of Olives, but was replaced by the Ascension. The panels were replaced in 1847, after a drawing by Antoine Ringeisen, architect of the city. A fifth portal, located to the west, was also built around 1320.

The main door of the church, with a carved tympanum, dates from the late fifteenth century. It could be the work of Conrad Sifer or his workshop, who was the designer of the rood screen of 1490. Indeed, the ornamental style is very reminiscent of the rood screen. The other side of the tympanum is carved with a Holy Face.

=== Keystones ===
The keystones in the church, carved from sandstone and painted in full colour, date from the thirteenth to the fifteenth century. Those of the transept and the nave are of the thirteenth and fourteenth centuries, those of the crypt and the choir of the fifteenth century. Their paintwork was restored in 1859 by Antoine François Denecken to their original state, i.e. in red and blue with gold detail. The individual keystones are decorated with various Christian symbols: the tetramorph, Christ, the Lamb, foliage, oak leaves and vines, Saint John the Baptist, Saint Agnes, a peasant, the Coronation of the Virgin, the Risen Christ and a king and a sword.

=== Capitals ===
The capitals of the nave date to the thirteenth and fourteenth centuries, those of the transept to the thirteenth century and those of the choir to the fifteenth century. Some are highly decorated.

=== Interior features ===
The church contains a number of statues dated from the seventeenth century to the nineteenth century. There is a statue of the Virgin and Child, made in 1730 by the Jesuits; a group of statues representing the education of the Blessed Virgin; statues of Saint George, Saint Nicholas, Saint Paul, Saint Peter, Saint Agnes and Saint Catherine; an eighteenth-century Lady of Mercy; a nineteenth-century statue of Christ; two further statues of the apostles Peter and Paul (this last has probably been modified, judging from the treatment of the robes); statues representing the Sacred Heart and another of the Blessed Virgin; and three statues of the Fathers of the Church. That of Saint Jerome has disappeared.

The grey sandstone altar has statues representing King David playing his harp and the sacrifice of Isaac. A second altar, from which the altarpiece has been removed, is situated in the southern apsidiole.

There are two pulpits. The first is Baroque, of grey stone painted in full colour. It was completed in 1619 by Jerome (Hieronimus) Kruch. The second is of carved wood painted in full colour and dates from 1733. Both were classified as historical artifacts on 18 April 1974.

The original organ by Johann Andreas Silbermann was moved to the Dominican church in Colmar in 1896. It was replaced that year by an instrument by Rinckenbach Martin (1834–1917). This was damaged by shelling in 1944, restored and then restored again in 1975. The railings show the arms of the town of Sélestat.

The church has various paintings, some dating back to the second half of the fifteenth century. There are two murals, fourteenth-century by their style. The painting in the north niche was classified as a historical artifact on 18 April 1974.

=== Windows ===
A bay by the choir has seven stained glass windows that still contain sections dated to between 1430 and 1460. The eleven glass aisles are the work of François Chapuis and date from 1986.

One window, dating from the third quarter of the fifteenth century, depicts the hagiography of Saint Agnes. It was added to in 1968 by Max Ingrand, but seven scenes out of fifteen are original.

=== Pews ===
The oak stalls are sixteen in number, eight on each wall, with a central passage. Although they date from the fifteenth century, they are substantially the work of Théophile Klem, who had them restored in 1862 at a cost of 3,000 francs. They conceal murals from the fifteenth century that were photographed during the restoration.

=== Monuments ===
A sandstone sarcophagus dating to the sixteenth or seventeenth century is preserved in the church. There is also the tomb of Professor H. Berchu, dedicated to his memory by his students. Both are in poor condition.

Beatus Rhenanus, German humanist scholar and one of the principal contributors to the Humanist Library, is buried here.

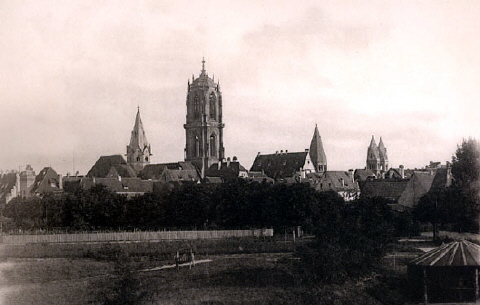
The church of St. George around 1900

=== Metalwork ===
An engraved silver ciborium dating to the fourth quarter of the eighteenth century is preserved in the church. It would have been manufactured between 1795 and 1798. There are also a silver monstrance, a reliquary, a cross, a chalice, and other treasures.

=== Liturgical vestments ===
The parish has a set of silk vestments dating from the eighteenth century or the first quarter of the nineteenth century.

== Exterior ==
=== Clock ===
The clock, by Jean-Baptiste Schwilgué, was motorised in 1955, then replaced due to malfunction in 1962. It was classified as a historical object on 5 August 1994, restored in 1996 (though not to its original condition), and is currently displayed in the Sélestat tourist office. The mechanism and pendulum date to its restoration and are not original.

== References and notes ==
Translator's note: These are in French.

== Bibliography ==
- Annuaires des Amis de la Bibliothèque Humaniste de Sélestat, 1996 to 2003.
