= Hohenstaufen (disambiguation) =

Hohenstaufen most commonly refers to the House of Hohenstaufen, a dynasty of the Holy Roman Empire.

Hohenstaufen may also refer to:

- Hohenstaufen Castle, the castle that served as the seat of the dynasty
- Hohenstaufen (mountain), the mountain upon which the castle is built
- Hohenstaufen (Göppingen), former imperial village, today a suburb of Göppingen
- 9. SS Panzer-Division Hohenstaufen, a German Waffen-SS Armoured division during World War II
