= Drei Kaiserberge =

Mountains in Baden-Württemberg, Germany

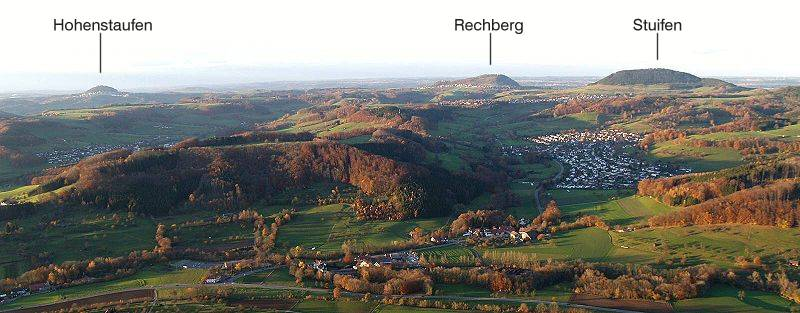

Geography
- Location: Baden-Württemberg, Germany

The Drei Kaiserberge (lit. three emperor-mountains) Hohenstaufen (684 meters), Rechberg (707 meters) and Stuifen (757 meters) are inlier mountains of the Swabian Alb in Baden-Württemberg, Germany. They form a distinctive group between Göppingen and Schwäbisch Gmünd and are a widely visible and prominent feature of the region. Since 4 October 1971, they have been protected together with Aasrücken and Rehgebirge as a Landschaftsschutzgebiet (landscape conservation area).

The name Kaiserberge references Hohenstaufen Castle, the family seat of the royal and imperial family Staufer. Its remains can be seen today at the top of Hohenstaufen.

The Kaiserberge are depicted in the city logos of Göppingen and Waldstetten.

Logo of Göppingen

Logo of Waldstetten

The route of the yearly marathon Albmarathon runs over all three mountains.

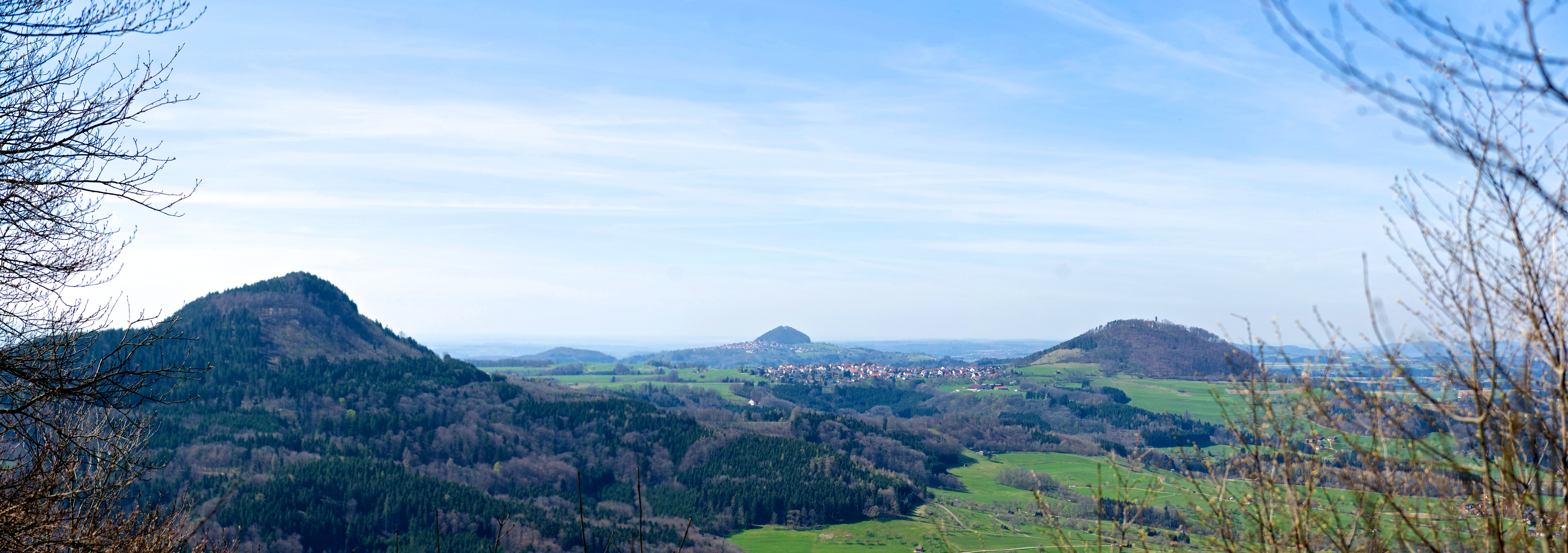
View from Hornberg towards Stuifen, Hohenstaufe and Rechberg
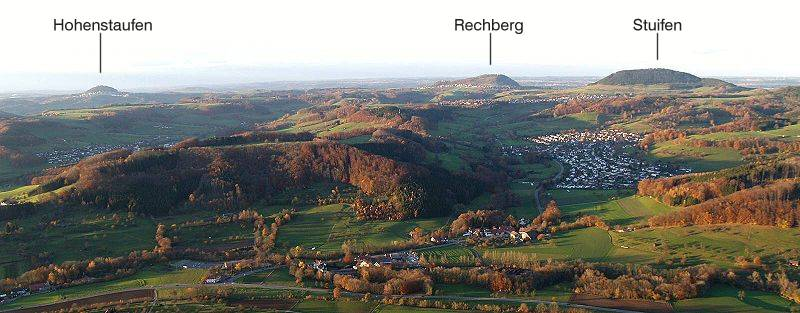
View of Hohenstaufen, Rechberg und Stuifen from Messelberg
