= Rechberg (mountain) =

Mountain in Germany

Coordinates: 48°45′24″N 9°47′24″E

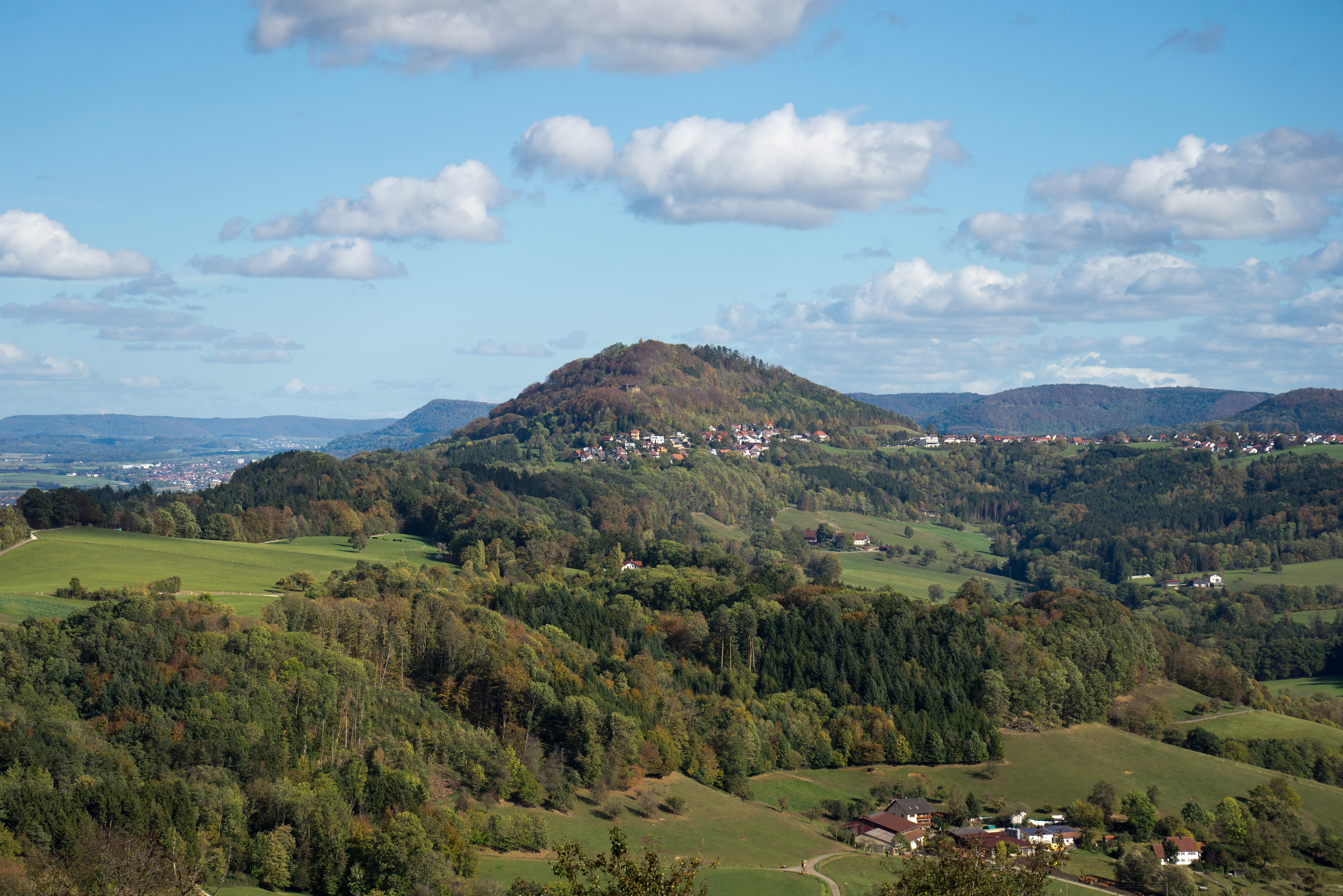
The Rechberg mountain as seen from the eastern slope of Hohenstaufen mountain

The Rechberg (el. 707.9 m.) is one of the three Imperial mountains near Göppingen in Baden-Württemberg in southern Germany. Together with the Hohenstaufen and Stuifen, it forms the so-called "Three Kaiser mountains" (Drei Kaiserberge).

It lies south of Schwäbisch Gmünd on the northern end of the Schwäbische Alb. The other two Imperial mountains are the Stuifen to the southeast and the Hohenstaufen to the west. In 1979, the Rechberg was made a state recreation area.

== Geography ==
The Rechberg rises about 5 km south of the city centre of Schwäbisch Gmünd on the boundary of the district Rechberg, which lies with two separate settlement parts at the western and south-eastern foot of the mountain. It has a roughly isosceles ground plan with the base in the east, where the higher Kirchberg with an open plateau of 1.5-2 hectares rises up to 708.1 m above sea level, while the lower spur Schlossberg at the pointed corner in the west after a not very deep saddle reaches only a height of 644.2 m. The larger part of the slopes is forested.

Coming from the west, the watershed between the river systems of Rems in the north and Fils in the south runs over the spur to the high plateau and bends here southwards. In the south the Krumm drains to the Fils, in the east the Rechbach and in the northeast the Tobelbach over the Waldstetter Bach to the Rems and in the remaining north the Tiefenbach with its source arms Felbenbach and Gießbach further west and down into it.

Coming from Straßdorf in the north, the L 1159 climbs the lower northern slope of the mountain in a large Hairpin turn and then runs on its middle eastern slope to the larger settlement part of Rechberg at its southeastern foot. From there a road on the southern slope opens up the smaller part of the village in the west and then descends into the valley of the river Krumm.

== History ==
Since the 15th century the Rechberg was the destination of pilgrimages. Today, the baroque Pilgrimage Church of St. Maria, built in 1686/88 by Count Bernhard Bero von Rechberg, stands in the middle of the open summit plateau.

On the western spur of the mountain, the ruins of Hohenrechberg tower above the smaller village of Rechberg. This ancestral castle of the later Counts of Rechberg, built at the time of the Staufers and first mentioned in 1179, was the centre of their dominion.

== Geology ==
205 million years ago, during the Jurassic, a sea stretched over large parts of what is now southern Germany. During the following 60 million years, about 600 m high Jurassic sediments were deposited in it, which are divided into Lower Jurassic, Middle Jurassic and Upper Jurassic layers. Later the terrain was raised above the sea.

In the course of time distortions occurred, causing some clods of the harder Upper Jurassic package to sink into the softer layers below. While erosion initially eroded the Upper Jurassic in the immediate vicinity, its sunken parts remained protected. When erosion subsequently also eroded the softer layer, the sunken layers were able to withstand it for a longer period of time. Therefore, today they stand prominently above their immediate surroundings resulting in an inverted relief in the form of the three Upper Jurassic mountains Hohenrechberg, Stuifen and Hohenstaufen.
