= Church of St. Maria (Hohenrechberg) =

Church in Baden-Württemberg, Germany

Coordinates: 48°45′25″N 9°47′25″E

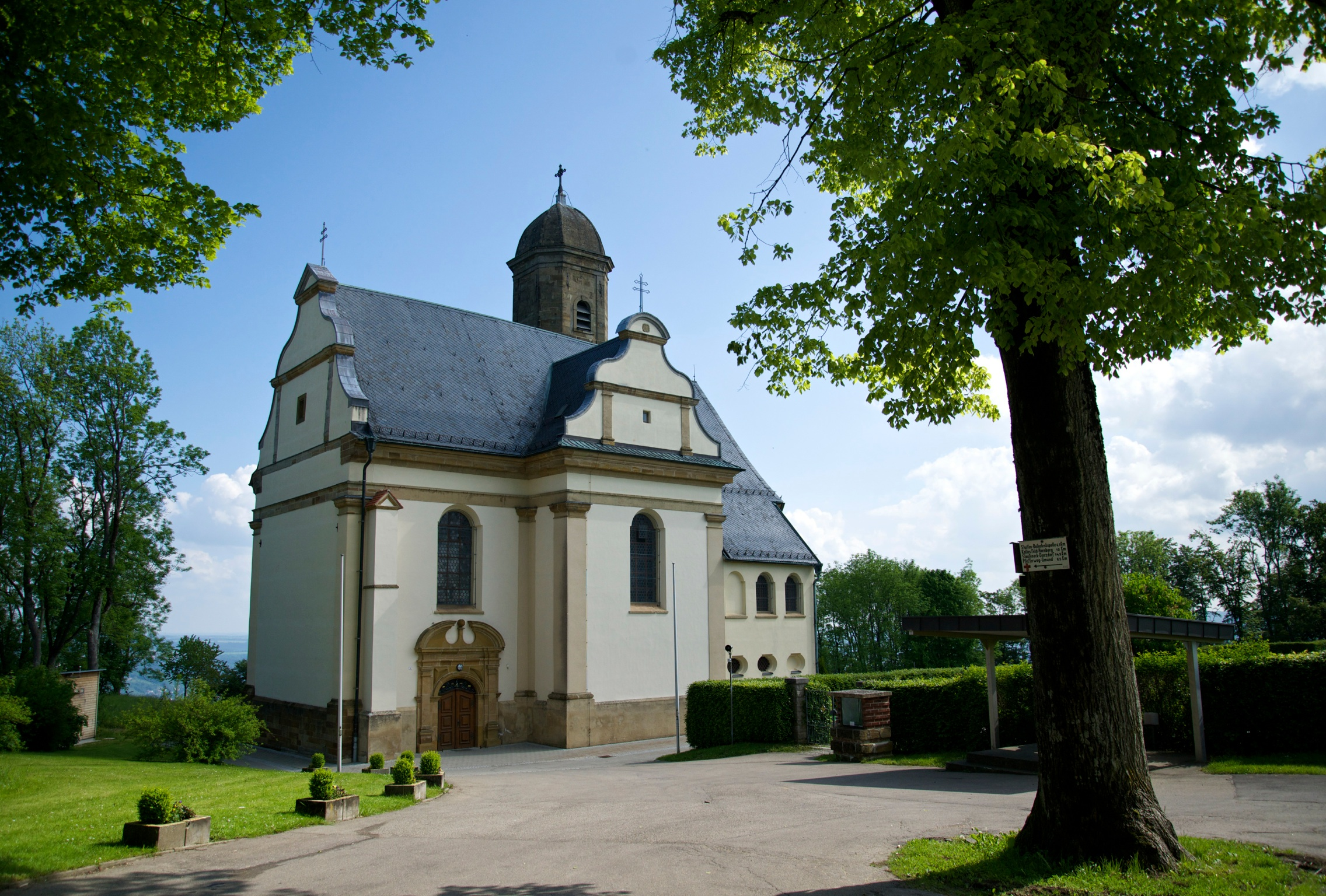
St. Maria Hohenrechberg in 2013

The Church of St. Maria on the Hohenrechberg is a Catholic pilgrimage church on the Rechberg near Schwäbisch Gmünd, Germany.

It is a popular destination for Catholic pilgrims. The church was originally built by the Counts of Rechberg and Rothenlöwen. Legend states that pilgrimages started when a hermit brought a beautiful carved wooden image of the Virgin Mary to the mountain and built a wooden chapel as a shrine. Around 1488. Count Ulrich II of Rechnberg had a stone church built on the site. Count Bernhard Bero of Rechberg commissioned a Baroque church to accommodate the number of pilgrims.

The church is under the authority of the Roman Catholic Diocese of Rottenburg-Stuttgart.
