= Messelberg =

Mountain in Baden-Württemberg, Germany

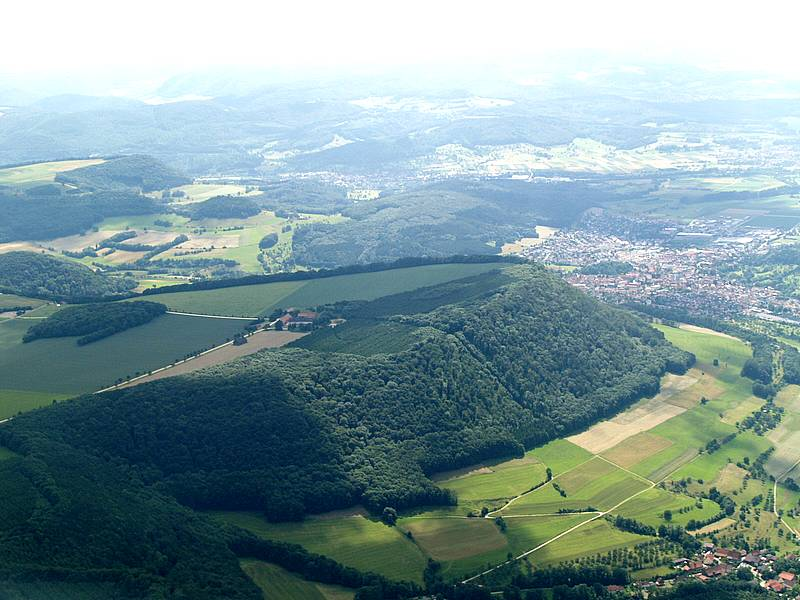
- Messelberg from south east with the town of Donzdorf behind it.

Highest point
- Elevation: 749 m (2,457 ft)

Geography
- Country: Germany
- State: Baden-Württemberg
- Parent range: Swabian Jura

Messelberg is a mountain of Baden-Württemberg, Germany. It reaches a height of 749 m above sea level. At the peak of the Messelberg, there is an easily accessible cliff called Messelstein. In good weather conditions the 130 km far away Black Forest can be seen.

== Gallery ==
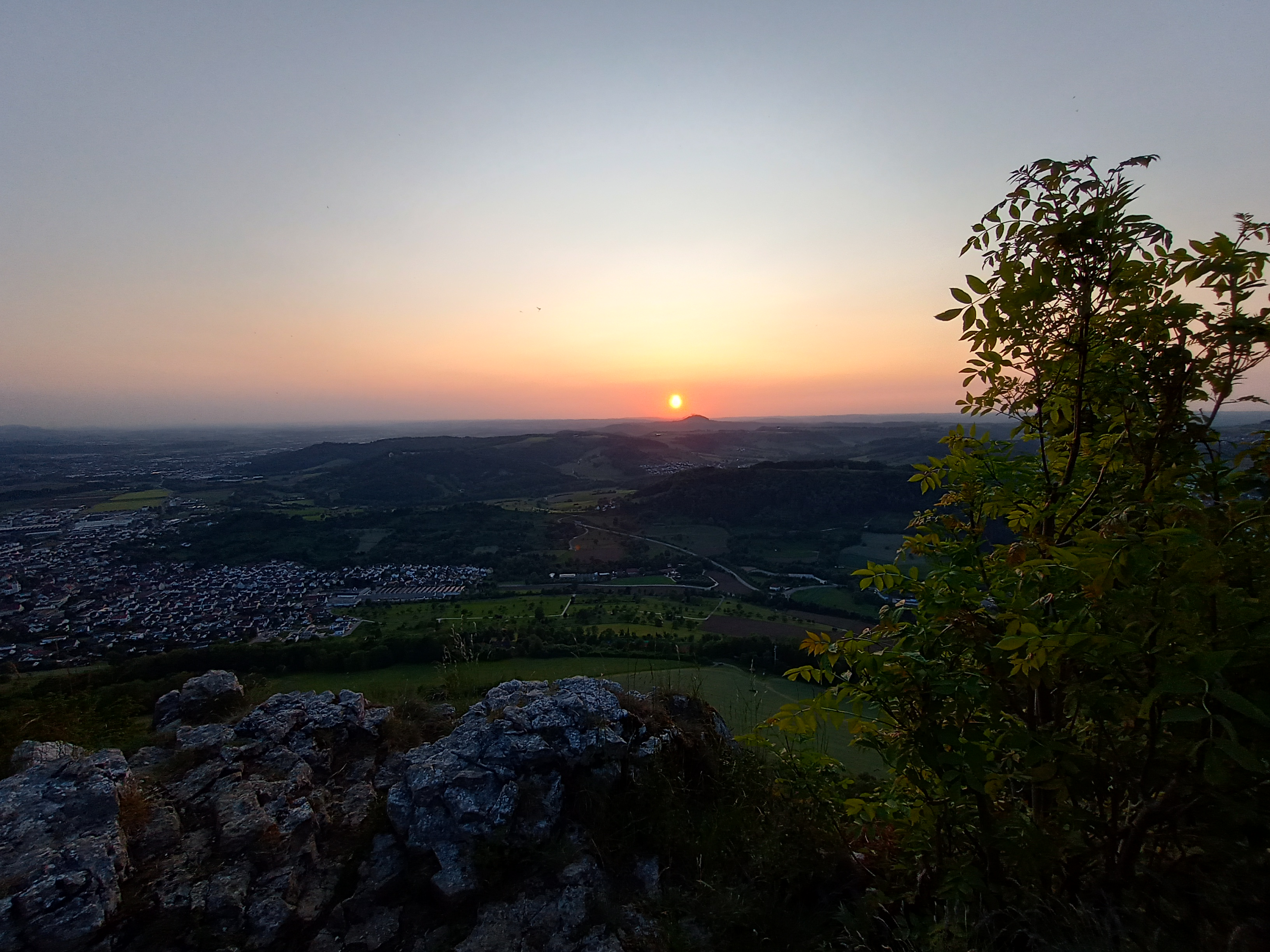
View from the Messelstein at sunset.

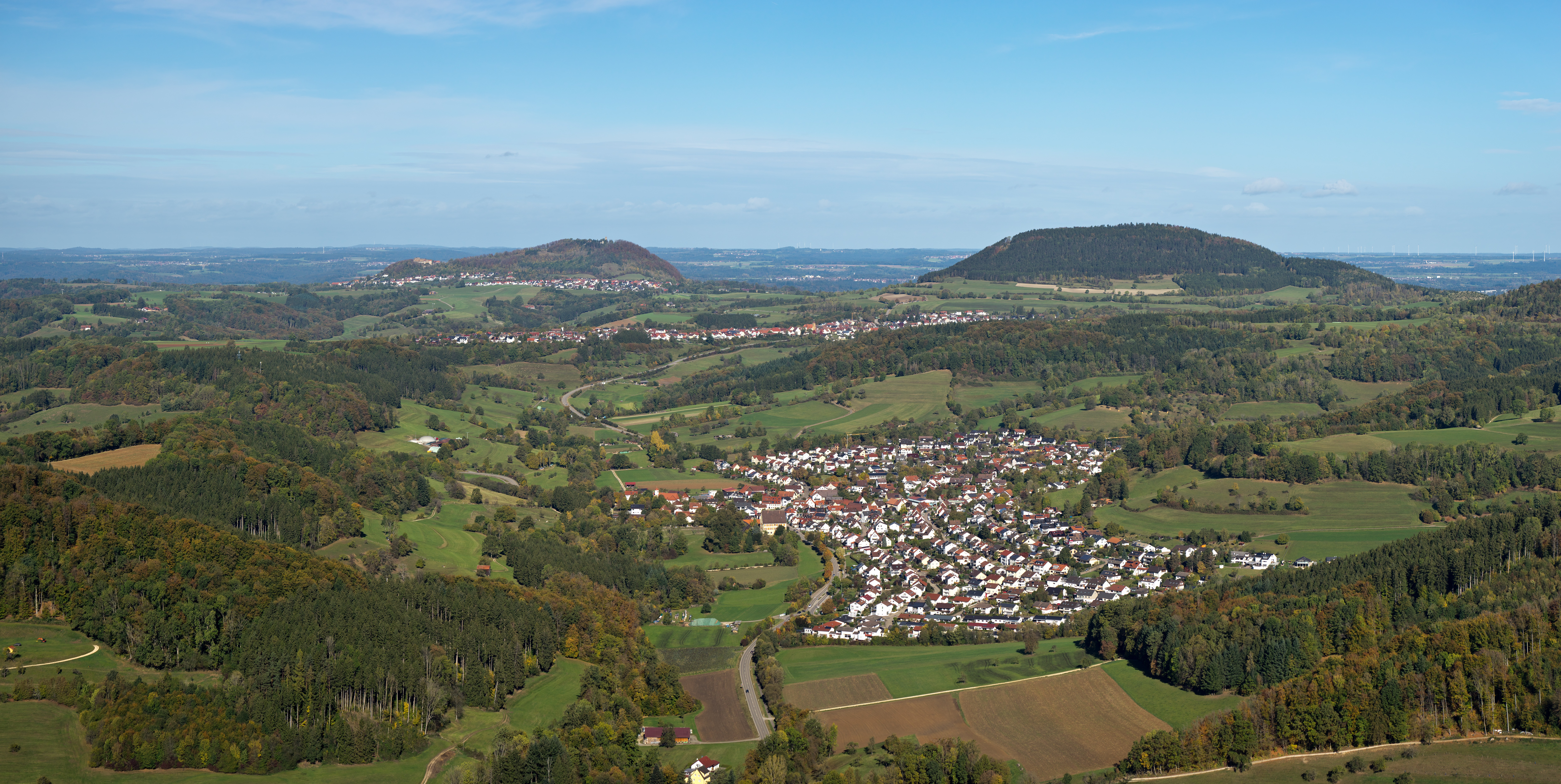
