= Hohenstaufen (mountain) =

Mountain in Göppingen District, Baden-Württemberg, Germany

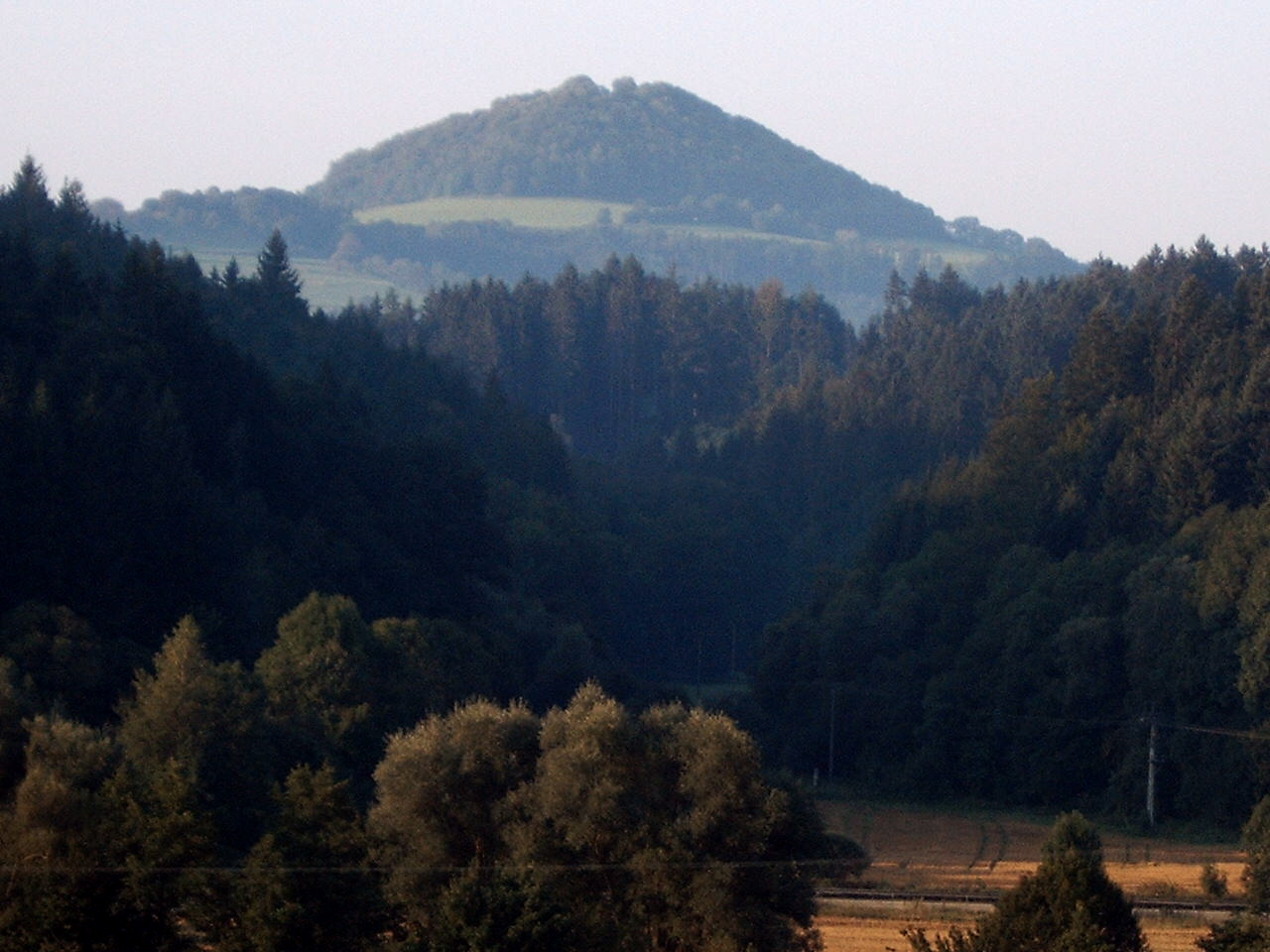

Highest point
- Elevation: 684 m (2,244 ft)
- Coordinates: 48°44′35″N 9°42′59″E

Geography
- Location within Baden-Württemberg
- Location: Baden-Württemberg, Germany
- Parent range: Swabian Alb

Hohenstaufen is a mountain in the Swabian Jura with an elevation of 684 metres (2,244 ft). It and two nearby mountains known as Rechberg and Stuifen together constitute the so-called "Three Kaiser mountains" (Drei Kaiserberge). The Hohenstaufen is easily visible from the little town of Lorch. The mountain towers over the forests that have overgrown the ruins of the Hohenstaufen Castle, the seat of the former House of Hohenstaufen.

There are many footpaths on the mountain that are easily accessible from three entrances. The summit is surrounded by beech trees which tower above the footpaths. At the peak of the mountain is a bar which serves German beer and other snacks, however, the bar is being reconstructed into a glass-like conservatory.

The name is derived from the shape of the mountain, which forms the shape of a chalice ("Stauf").

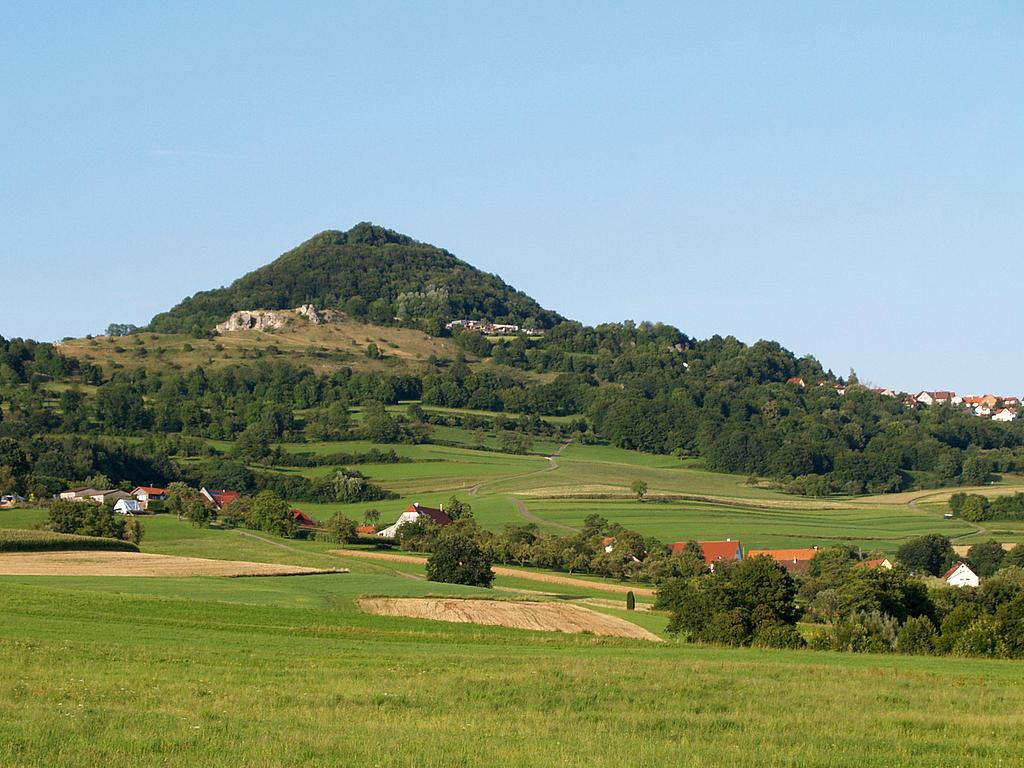
View from South
