= Hohenstaufen Castle =

Castle ruin in Germany

- Hohenstaufen, Göppingen, Germany
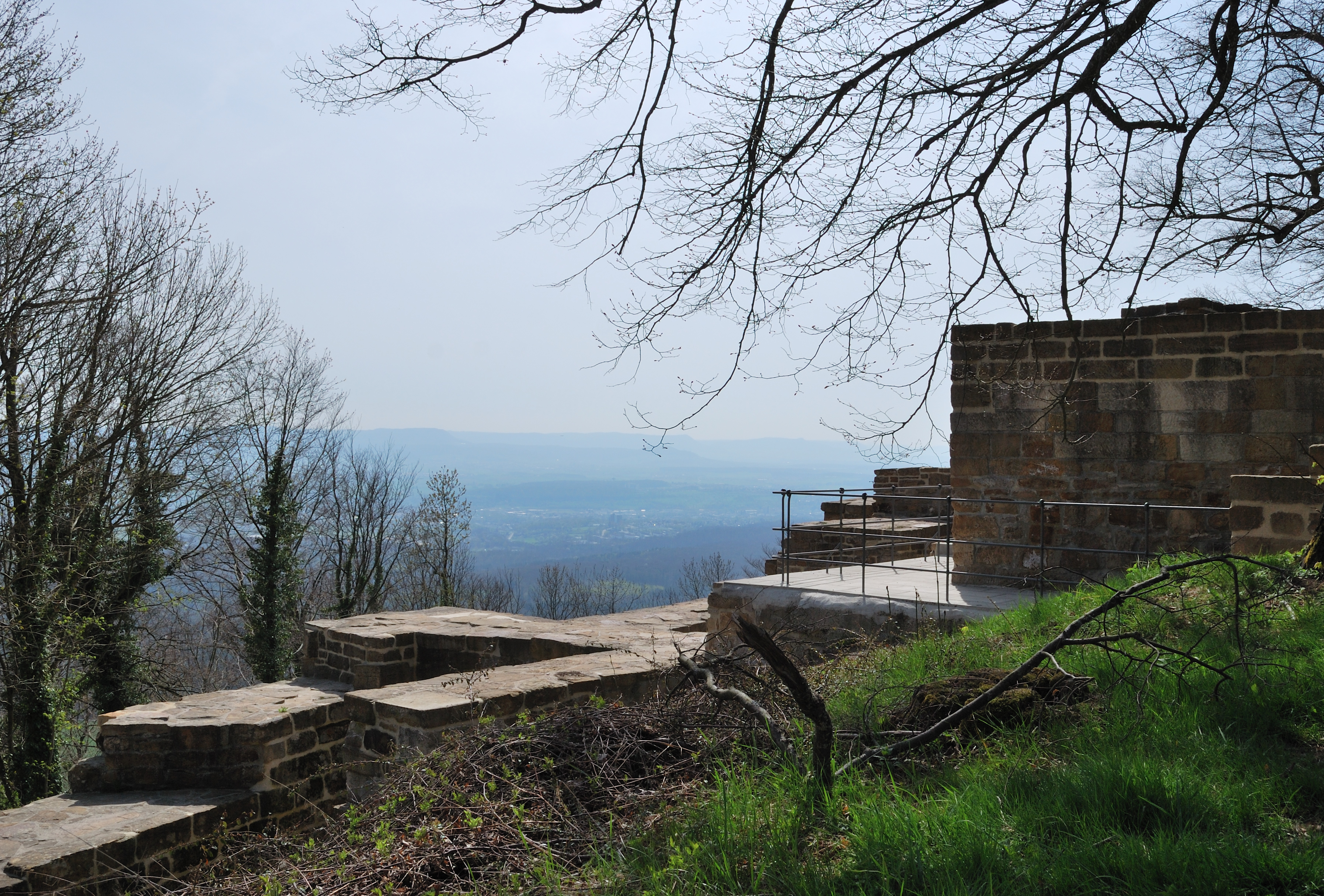
- View from the castle ruins

Site information
- Type: Castle
- Open to the public: Yes
- Condition: Ruin

Location
- The location within Baden-Württemberg Germany Hohenstaufen (Germany)
- Coordinates: 48.743°N 9.716°E

Site history
- Built: 1050–1079
- In use: 1079–1525
- Materials: Stone
- Demolished: 1525
- Battles/wars: Peasants War

Hohenstaufen Castle (German: Burg Hohenstaufen) is a ruined castle in Göppingen in Baden-Württemberg, Germany. The hill castle was built in the 11th century, on a conical hill between the Rems and Fils rivers (both tributaries of the Neckar) in what was then the Duchy of Swabia. It was the seat of the Staufer (Hohenstaufen) dynasty, the Dukes of Swabia for the period of 1079–1268, with three Holy Roman Emperors during 1155–1250. The castle was destroyed in the German Peasants' War of 1525.

Hohenstaufen Castle can be found on Hohenstaufen Mountain, 684 m (2,244 ft) above sea level. The word Stauf means "drinking vessel" (beaker or cup) and refers to the conical shape of the mountain.

== Middle Ages ==
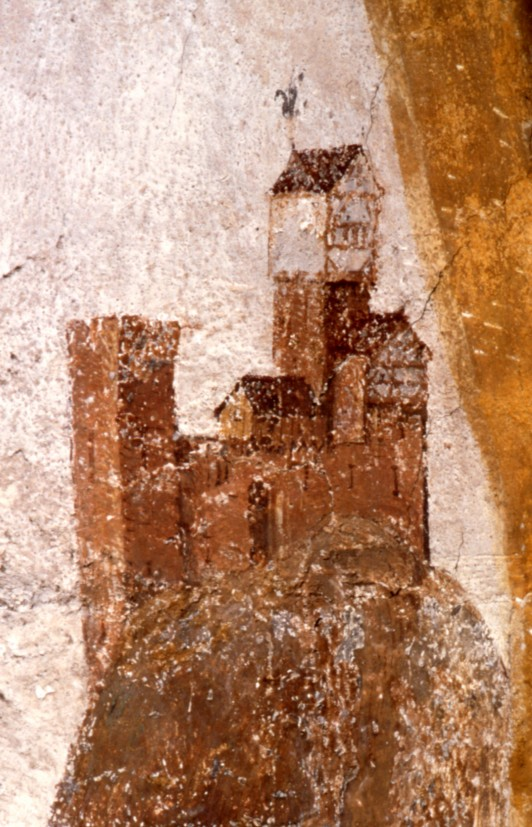
Fresco in Oberhofen Church, Göppingen, c. 1470

Hohenstaufen castle was built about 1070 by Frederick I of Hohenstaufen—even before he became Duke of Swabia—as a fortress to protect family interests in the vicinity. Until the 13th century, the castle was a possession of the imperial and royal family, the Hohenstaufen dynasty. In 1181, Emperor Frederick Barbarossa stayed there; in 1208, Irene Angelina, the widow of Barbarossa's son, the recently murdered Philip of Swabia, died at Hohenstaufen Castle.

After the fall of the Hohenstaufen in 1268, the castle was declared an imperial possession by the Habsburg king Rudolf I of Germany. The strategically and symbolically important location was a constant bone of contention between the Counts of Württemberg and the Holy Roman Emperor.

In 1372, Hohenstaufen Castle finally was in the hands of the Württemberg rulers. After the expulsion of Duke Ulrich of Württemberg by the members of the Swabian League in 1519, one Georg Staufer of Bloßenstaufen successfully claimed the castle, as a descendant of the old Hohenstaufen dynasty. Therefore, only a small force defended the castle in 1525, when it was taken and destroyed by the peasants during the German Peasants' War. Stones from the castle were later used in the construction of the Renaissance Göppingen Castle.

== Modern times ==
Since the German unification of 1871, Hohenstaufen Castle has been regarded as a national monument. The archaeologist Walther Veeck undertook excavations on it between 1936 and 1938, and further excavations were made between 1967 and 1971, uncovering and securing the castle foundations. A Hohenstaufen memorial stele (Stauferstele) was inaugurated in 2002. In 2009 additional work was done to preserve the site. It is also worth mentioning that in the beginning of 1943, the 9th Armored SS division received its title "Hohenstaufen" – because most Waffen-SS divisions' and regiments' official titles were based on renowned people, places or media with roots in Germanic history.

The Staufer Museum, located at the intersection of Pfarrgasse and Kaiserbergsteige in Hohenstaufen, contains artifacts from and historical information about the site. The trail that leads to the castle site starts between the two churches that are adjacent to the Staufer Museum.

== Gallery ==
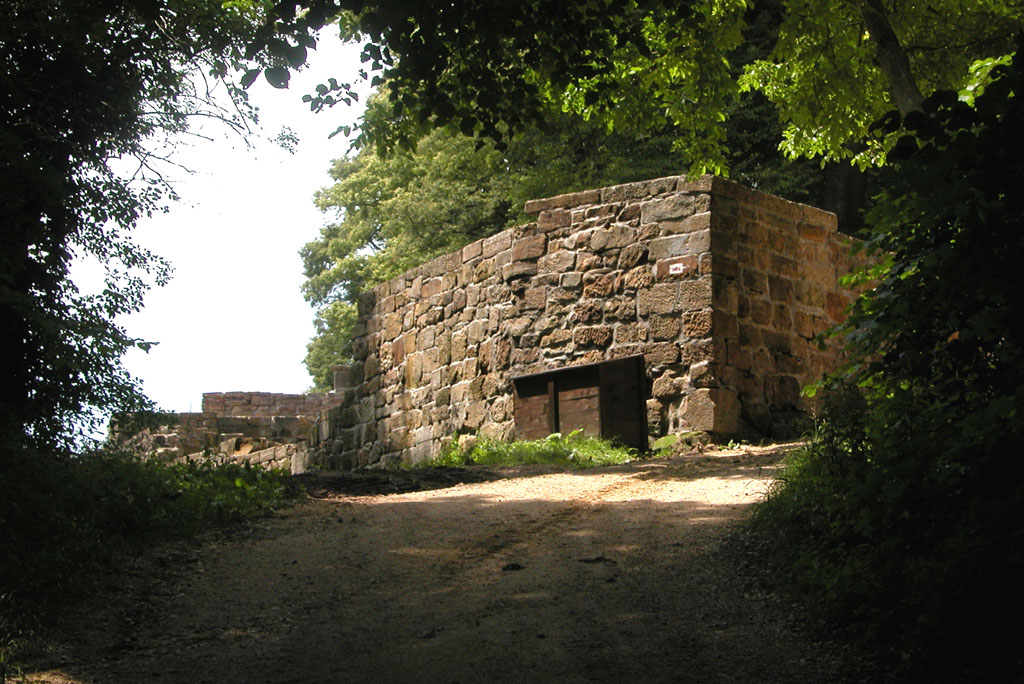
Hohenstaufen Castle Ruins

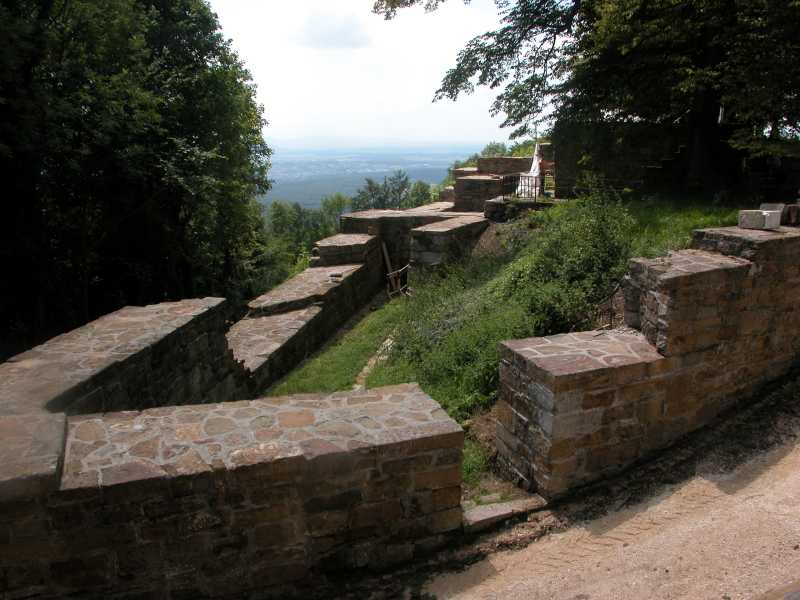
Hohenstaufen Castle Ruins

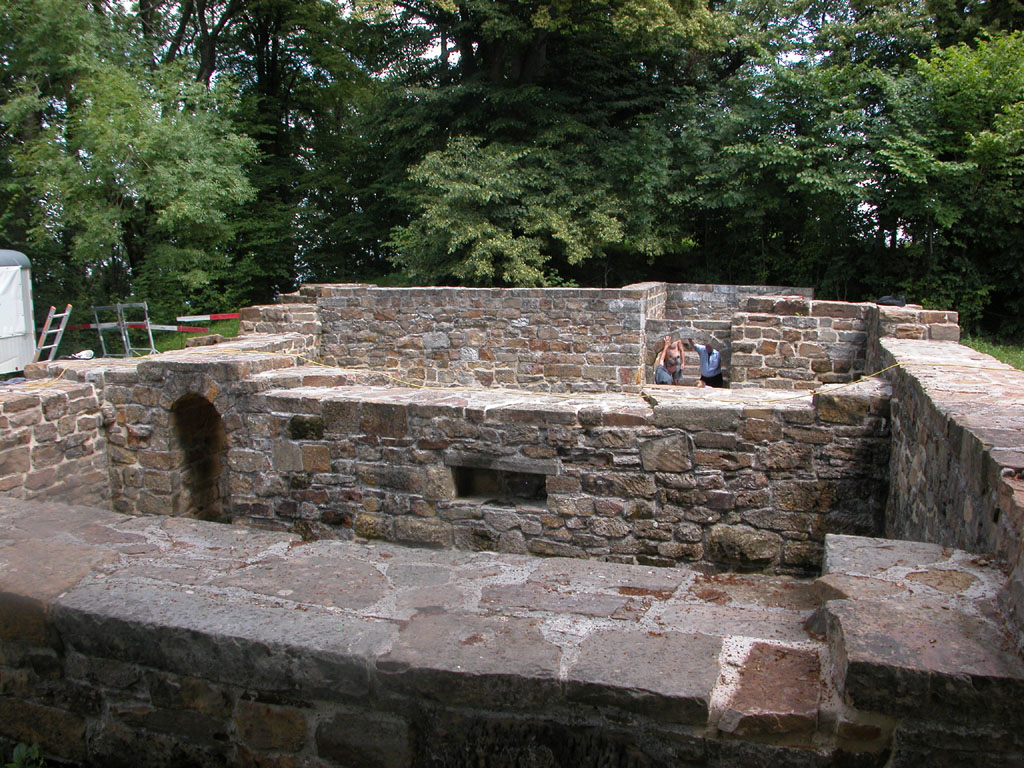
Hohenstaufen Castle Ruins

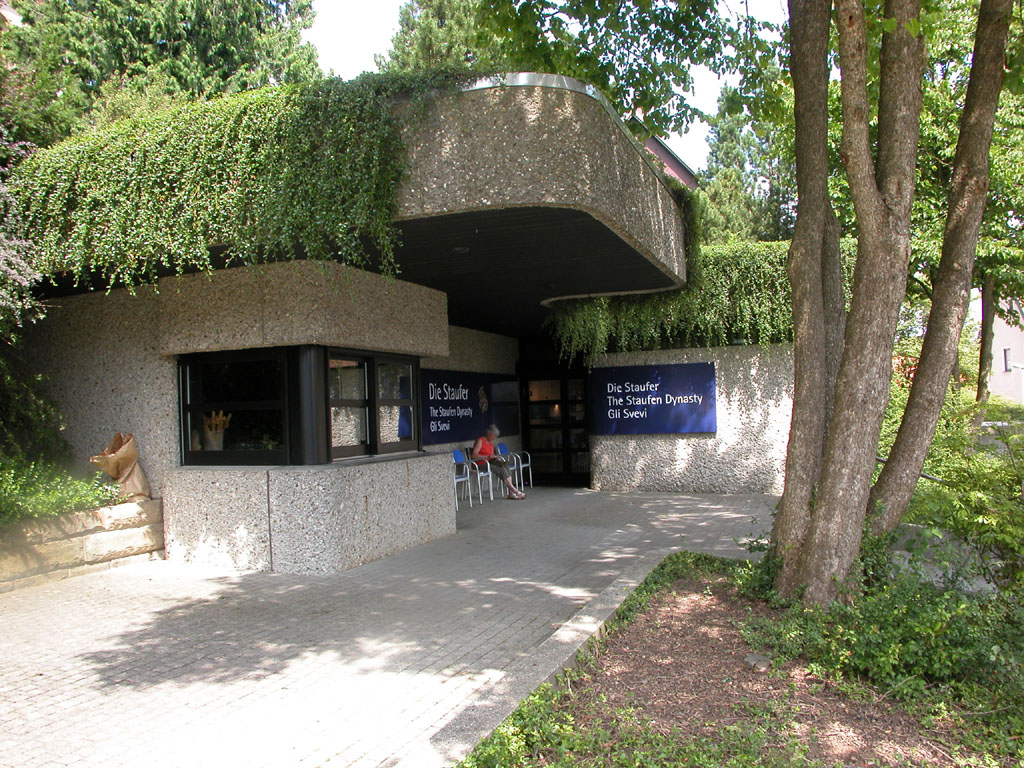
Staufer Museum in Hohenstaufen
