= Ludwig Dringenberg =

Ludwig Dringenberg (born between 1410 and 1415 at Dringenberg in the Prince-Bishopric of Paderborn; died in 1477 at Sélestat in Alsace), was a German monk, educator and humanist.

Born in Dringenberg in Westphalia, Ludwig probably attended the school of the Brethren of the Common Life, known as the Hieronymusschule in the monastery at Böddeken. He began his studies at Heidelberg in 1430 and in 1441, he was appointed director of the Latin school at Sélestat. At Sélestat he founded the famous Humanist Library in 1442. He had the humanist Jakob Wimpfeling as a pupil.
