= Jakob Wimpfeling =

Renaissance humanist and theologian (1450-1528)

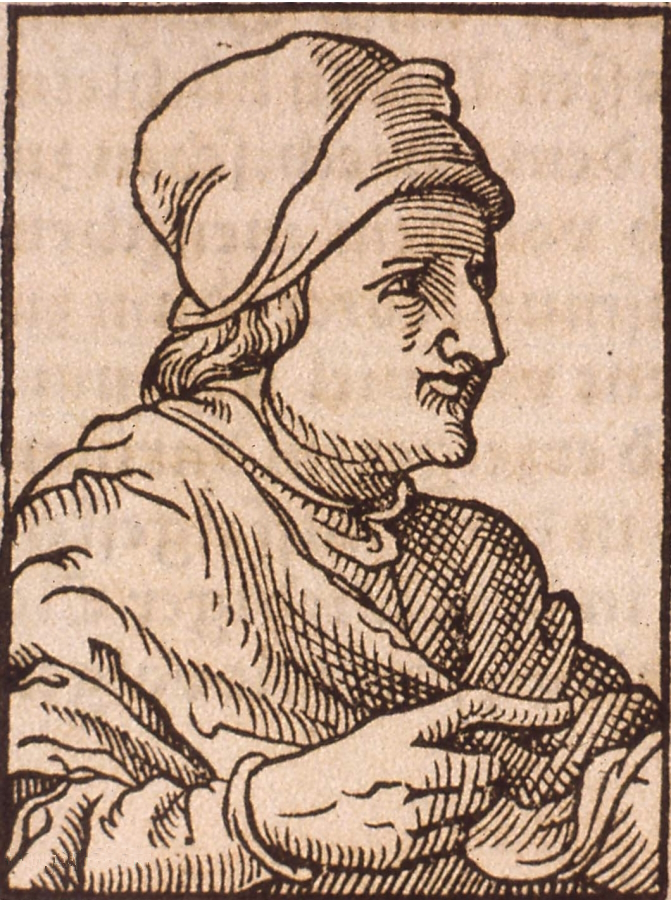
Portrait of Wimpfeling

Jakob Wimpfeling (25 July 1450 – 17 November 1528) was an Alsatian Renaissance humanist and theologian.

== Biography ==
Wimpfeling was born in Schlettstadt (now Sélestat), Alsace. He went to the school at Schlettstadt, which was run by Ludwig Dringenberg, the founder of the Humanist Library of Sélestat. In 1464 he became a student at the University of Freiburg, where he received his baccalaureus in 1466; later he went to the University of Erfurt and the University of Heidelberg, where he received his magister in 1471. He then studied Canon law for three years, and finally theology.

In 1483, he was cathedral preacher at Speyer. In 1498, Philip, Elector Palatine, called him to Heidelberg as professor of rhetoric and poetry. From 1500, he lived in Strasbourg, with its bishop Albert of Palatinate-Mosbach as his patron. There he devoted himself to writing, before returning to his birthplace in 1513. At Schlettstadt a circle of pupils and admirers gathered around him. Differences of opinion on Lutheranism broke up this literary society.

After Martin Luther's excommunication he took part in the attempt to prevail upon the Curia to withdraw the ban. This caused him to be suspected of having written a lampoon on the Curia, Litancia pro Germania, which was probably actually written by Hermann von dem Busche.

In 1521, Wimpfeling submitted to the Roman Church, of which he was ever afterwards a loyal son. In 1524 he added to Jerome Emser's dialogue against Huldrych Zwingli's Canonis missae defensio in an open letter to Luther and Zwingli, in which he exhorted them to examine the scriptures carefully in order to discover for themselves that the Canon of the Mass contains nothing contrary to the doctrines and customs of the early Church. Wimpfeling then retired from the struggle, and was ridiculed by Lutherans as a renegade and a persecutor of heretics.

He died in 1528 in Schlettstadt.

== Works ==
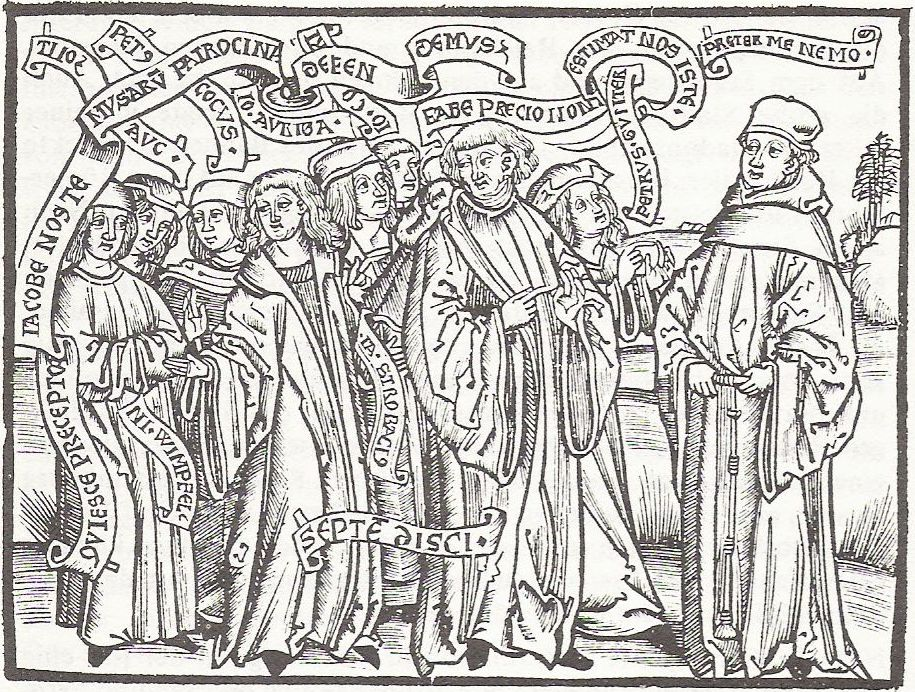
Jakob Wimpfeling and his students debating with Thomas Murner, Defensio Germaniae Jacobi Wympfelingii, 1502

Wimpfeling's literary career began with a few publications in which he urged the more frequent holding of synods, the veneration of the Blessed Virgin, and an improvement of the discipline of the clergy.

The Elegantiarum medulla (1493) is an extract from Lorenzo Valla's books on the elegance of the Latin language. In the Isidoneus germanicus (1496) he presented his pedagogical ideals, and opposed scholasticism. The teaching of grammar should lead to the reading of heathen writers who were not immoral and especially of the Christian writers. He also laid emphasis on learning the practical sciences. His most important work, Adolescentia (1500), was intended to supplement Isidoneus. Here he set forth the ethical side of his pedagogical scheme. The troubles of the Church spring from the bad training of the young; consequently, young people must be trained so as to be well-established in morals. He then discusses the details of twenty laws for young men.

He showed himself a fiery patriot in the Germanic (1501), which involved him in a feud with Murner. His Epitome rerum germanicarum (1505) is a short history of the Germans, drawn in some particulars from other historians. In several writings he opposed abuses in the Church.

Wimpfeling bequeathed several of his books and manuscripts to the Humanist Library of Sélestat, where they are still kept today.
