= Gellone Sacramentary =

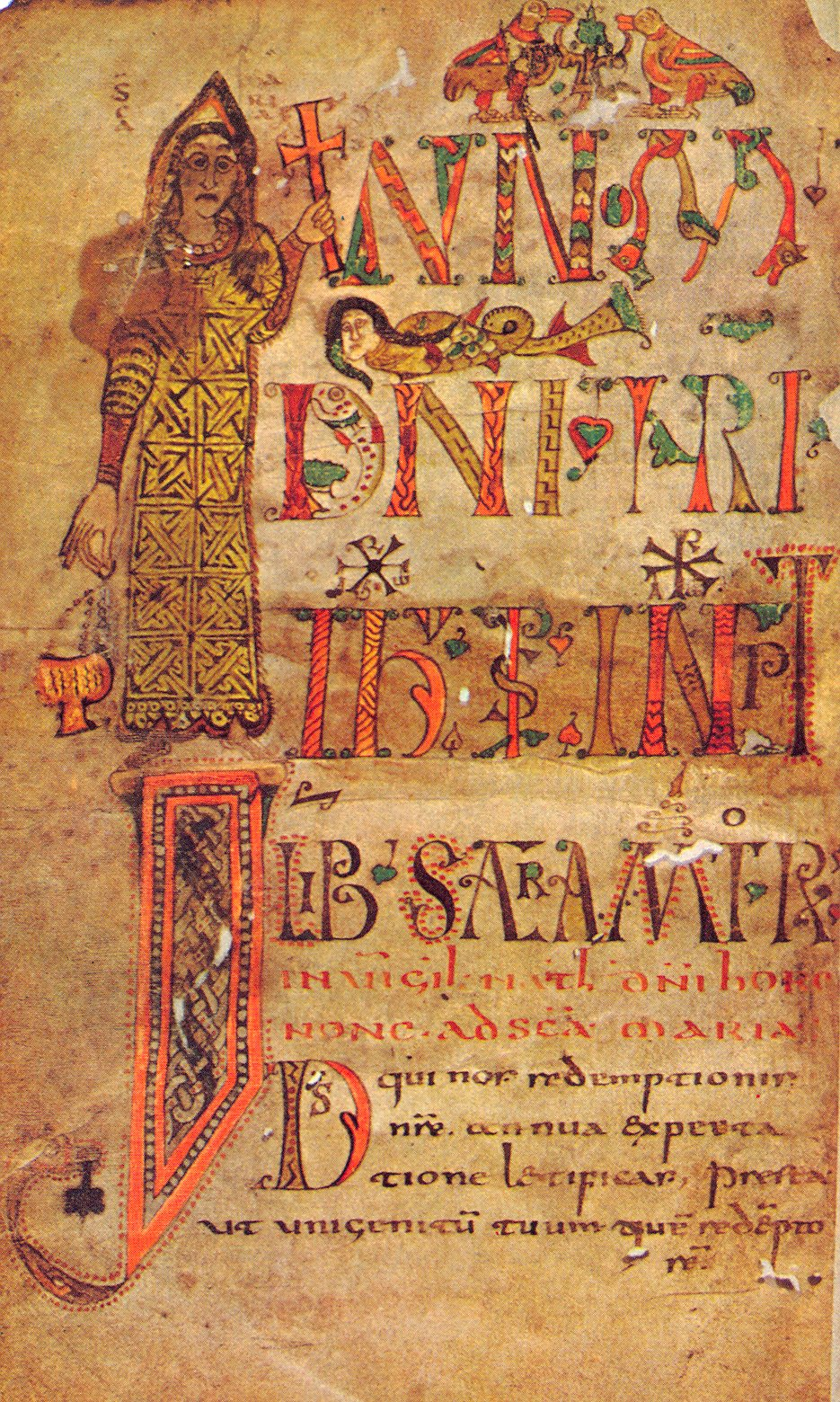
A page of the manuscript

Gellone Sacramentary is a late 8th century illuminated manuscript. It is now in the manuscripts department of the Bibliotheque Nationale de France, shelfmark Latin 12048. It is recorded in Saint-Guilhem-le-Désert Abbey at the start of the 9th century. Its style is directly influenced by Merovingian illumination.

== History ==
Its origins are controversial, with some indications that it was copied in a double monastery of monks and nuns in the Diocese of Meaux for Old Cambrai Cathedral. Another manuscript in the same handwriting was also produced for that cathedral. It was definitely there during the episcopate of Hildoard (c. 790-800). It was then owned by William of Gellone, maybe given to him by his cousin Charlemagne. He gave it to Saint-Guilhem-le-Désert Abbey, which he had founded with Benedict of Aniane. it stayed there until entering the library of the Abbey of Saint-Germain-des-Prés in Paris in 1638. That abbey's library was merged into the French national library in 1796.

== Description ==
It contains liturgical texts according to the rite of pope Gelasius I, merging the Frankish and Roman rite with the new Gregorian tradition. Its texts sort into two parts:

- Folios 1-262
  - Sacramentary (1-328)
  - Episcopal blessings (329-330)
  - Various prayers (331-343)
  - Baptismal liturgy (344)
  - Pontifical liturgy (345-512)
- Folios 263 - 276
  - Two martyrologies

It was copied by two, three or four scribes working in the same scriptorium. Seven different hands added to the text at the end of the 9th century. The verso of folio 1 shows the Virgin Mary holding a cross and a censor and that of folio 143 shows a crucifixion, perhaps the oldest image of the crucifixion in a Frankish manuscript.

== Bibliography ==
- Carl R. Baldwin, "The Scribes in the Sacramentary of Gellone", Scriptorium, no 27, 1973, p. 16-20
- (in French) A. Dumas (O.S.B.) et J. Deshusses, Liber sacramentorum Gellonensis. Introductio, tabulae et indices, Turnhout, Brepols, coll. « Corpus Christianorum. Series latina » (no 159a), 1981, xxxvi + 212 p.
- (in French) Bernard Teyssèdre, Le sacramentaire de Gellone et la figure humaine dans les manuscrits francs du VIIIe siecle : de l'enluminure à l'illustration, éditions Privat, collection « Visions meridionales », 1959, 166 pages.
- (in French) Robert Saint-Jean, Languedoc roman, chapitre sur l'Enluminure, éditions Zodiaque, 1975, La Pierre-qui-Vire, Yonne, p. 366
- (in French) Carl Nordenfalk, L'Enluminure au Moyen Âge, Éditions Skira, Genève, 1988 (1st edition, Le Haut Moyen Âge, 1957), p. 44-53
