= Sélestat Lectionary =

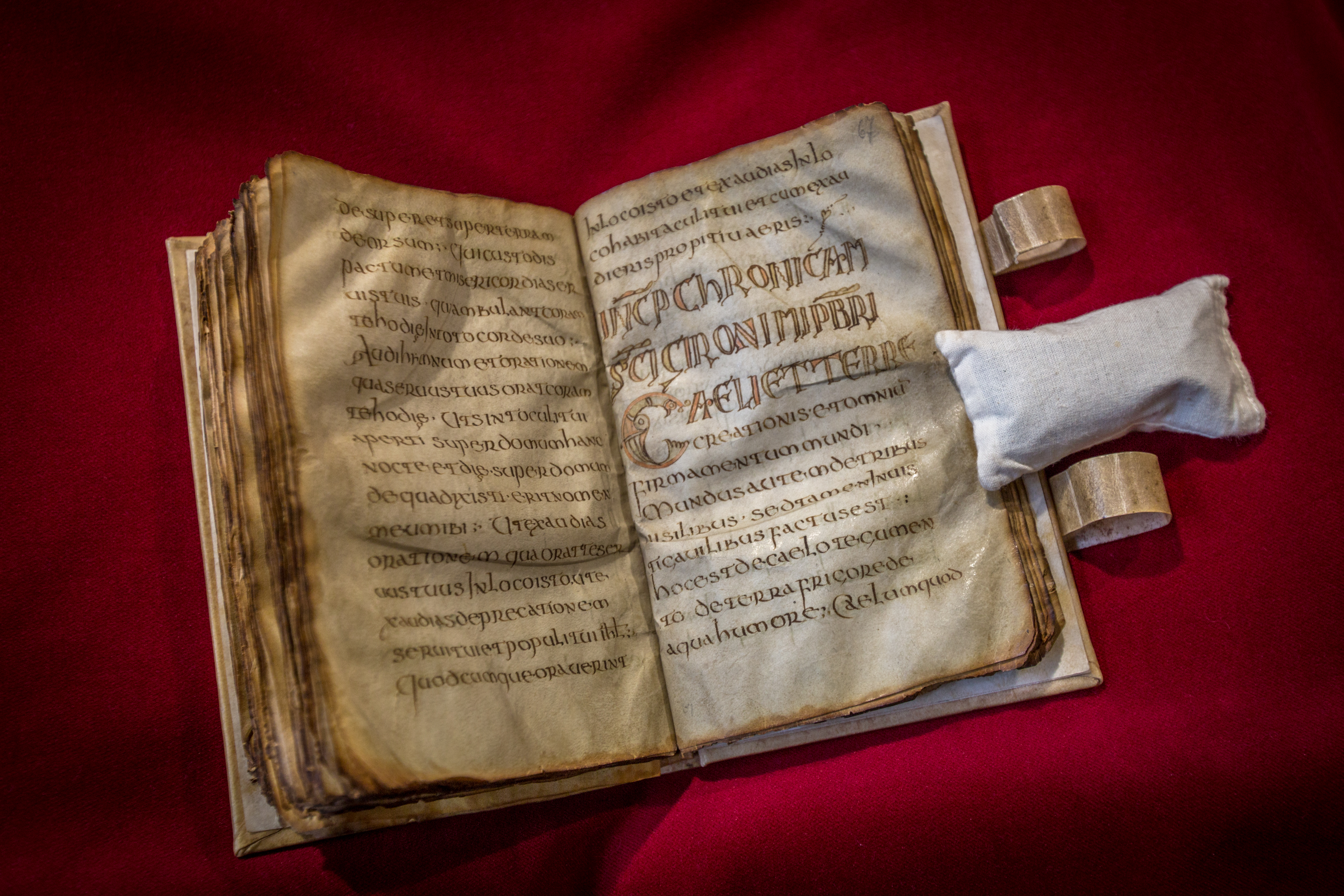
Folios 66v-67r.

The Sélestat Lectionary is a Merovingian illuminated manuscript dating to around 700. It contains part of the texts from a lectionary and is the oldest manuscript in Alsace in France. It is held in the Humanist Library of Sélestat.

Written in semi-uncial, it contains 59 texts for Mass, of which 45 are drawn from the Old Testament books of Isaiah, Jeremiah and Ezekiel and 19 from the Acts of the Apostles. It concludes with an apocryphal chronicle of Jerome. It only contains ornamental initials and occasionally an ornamented title.

== Bibliography ==
- Munier, Charles : « Le lectionnaire de Sélestat ». in : Annuaire 1993 des amis de la bibliothèque humaniste de Sélestat, p. 7- 22.
- Adam, Paul : « Catalogue sommaire des Manuscrits de la bibliothèque humaniste de Sélestat ». in : L'Humanisme à Sélestat, Sélestat : Alsatia, [1978], chapter IV, p. 100.
- Lowe, E. A. : Codices Latini Antiquiores, Oxford : Clarendon press, 1953, n° 829.
- Förster, Max : « Das älteste mittellateinische Gesprächsbüchlein ». in : Sonderabdruck aus "Romanische Forschungen" Bd. XXVII., p. 342 - 348.
- Morin, G. : « Un Lectionnaire mérovingien avec fragments du texte occidental des actes ». in : Revue bénédictine, XXVe année, n°2, 1908
- Munier, Charles : « La chronique pseudo-hiéronymienne de Sélestat ». in : Revue bénédictine, t. 104, n° 2, 1994, p. 106 - 122.
