= Sack of Luxeuil =

Many modern sources report that Luxeuil Abbey was sacked by Arab raiders in 731 or 732. Earlier evidence for such an attack is lacking and it does not appear to have taken place. At best, it is a hypothesis that explains the decline of Luxeuil, but several other theories exist and there is no direct evidence of the destruction of Luxeuil by raiders.

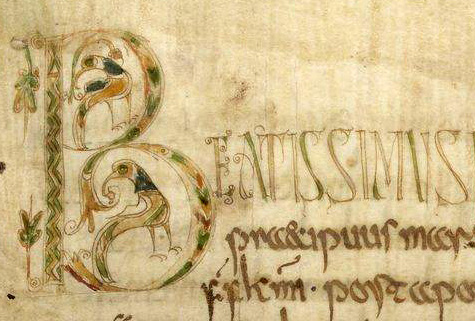
Luxeuil script in the Lectionary of Luxeuil, a manuscript copied at Luxeuil around 700

The earliest reference to the sack of Luxeuil is a forged charter of the 12th century, which attributes the sack to Hungarian invaders and dates it to the reign of Charlemagne (768–814). This story is itself taken over from the 10th-century Vita Deicoli, a biography of Deicolus, founder of Lure Abbey. The Vita, however, makes Lure the victim of the Hungarians earlier in the 10th century.

In 1684, Placide de Villiers in his Chronicon Luxoviense dated the sack of Luxeuil to 778. It became attached to the date 731 because the 12th-century chronicler John of Bèze records the Arab sack of Bèze in that year. It was later transferred to 732 by a misreading of a comment in Jean Mabillon's Annales (1704).

The supposed sack of Luxeuil has been used to explain the decline in book production at Luxeuil in the mid-8th century. Likewise, certain authentic early medieval records may be often explained by reference to the alleged sack. In the 10th century, Adso of Montier-en-Der, relying on a list of abbots, wrote that the monastery went into decline during the abbacy of Mellinus sometime before 814. A version of this list of abbots was published in the first edition of the Gallia Christiana (1656) and by Patrick Fleming (1667), but the manuscript of which is now lost. This version attributed the decline under Mellinus to the destruction of the monastery by the Vandals and/or Hungarians and states that there no abbot for fifteen years. In Charles Le Cointe (1670) and in Mabillon, these are assumed to be Arabs. Mabillon argues that "Vandals" simply indicated invaders from North Africa, the former Vandal Kingdom.

Although evidence for an Arab attack on Luxeuil is absent, such an attack was possible. Ado of Vienne, writing in the 9th century, reports Arab raiding in Burgundy around that time, but does not mention Luxeuil. The Chronicle of Moissac reports the sack of Autun in August 725 and 11th- and 12th-century sources report an attack on Sens. The decline of Luxeuil, however, may be better explained by the actions of Charles Martel in Burgundy in 733–735. Gilles Cugnier attributes the sack of Luxeuil to the Saxons and dates it to the revolt of 778, following a hypothesis first put forward by Jean-Jacques Chifflet in 1618.

The sack of 731 or 732 is seemingly not the only sack that did not happen in the history of Luxeuil. About 1280, Simon of Kéza claimed that Attila the Hun sacked Luxeuil among many other places, but his account is not reliable for such a detail.

== Sources ==
- Barbet-Massin, Dominique (2023). "L'enluminure dans les manuscrits de Luxeuil aux VII^{e} et VIII^{e} siècles". Les cahiers colombaniens: 88–111.
- Cugnier, Gilles (2003). Histoire du monastère de Luxeuil à travers ses abbés, 590–1790. Tome I: Les trois premiers siècles, 590–888. D. Guéniot.
- Ganz, David (2002). "Texts and Scripts in Surviving Manuscripts in the Script of Luxeuil". In Michael Richter (ed.). Ireland and Europe in the Early Middle Ages: Texts and Transmission. Four Courts Press. pp. 186–204.
- Linn, Jason (2021). "Attila's Invasion of Gaul in 451 and Re-horsing the Huns". Acta Antiqua Academiae Scientiarum Hungaricae. 61 (3): 277–293.
- Mouillebouche, Hervé (2010). "Un autre mythe historiographique: le sac d'Autun par les Sarrasins" (PDF). Annales de Bourgogne. 82 (1–2): 5–36.
- Nees, Lawrence (2023). Illuminating the Word in the Early Middle Ages. Cambridge University Press.
- Palmer, James T. (2015). "The Otherness of Non-Christians in the Early Middle Ages". Studies in Church History. 51: 33–52.
- Palmer, James T. (2019). "Was the Arab Destruction of Luxeuil (731) Made Up?". Merovingian World: James T Palmer on the Early Middle Ages and Other Things. WordPress.
- Sénac, Philippe (2023). L'autre bataille de Poitiers: Quand la Narbonnaise était arabe (VIII^{e} siècle). Armand Colin.
