= Humanist Library of Sélestat =

Coordinates: 48°15′38″N 7°27′20″E

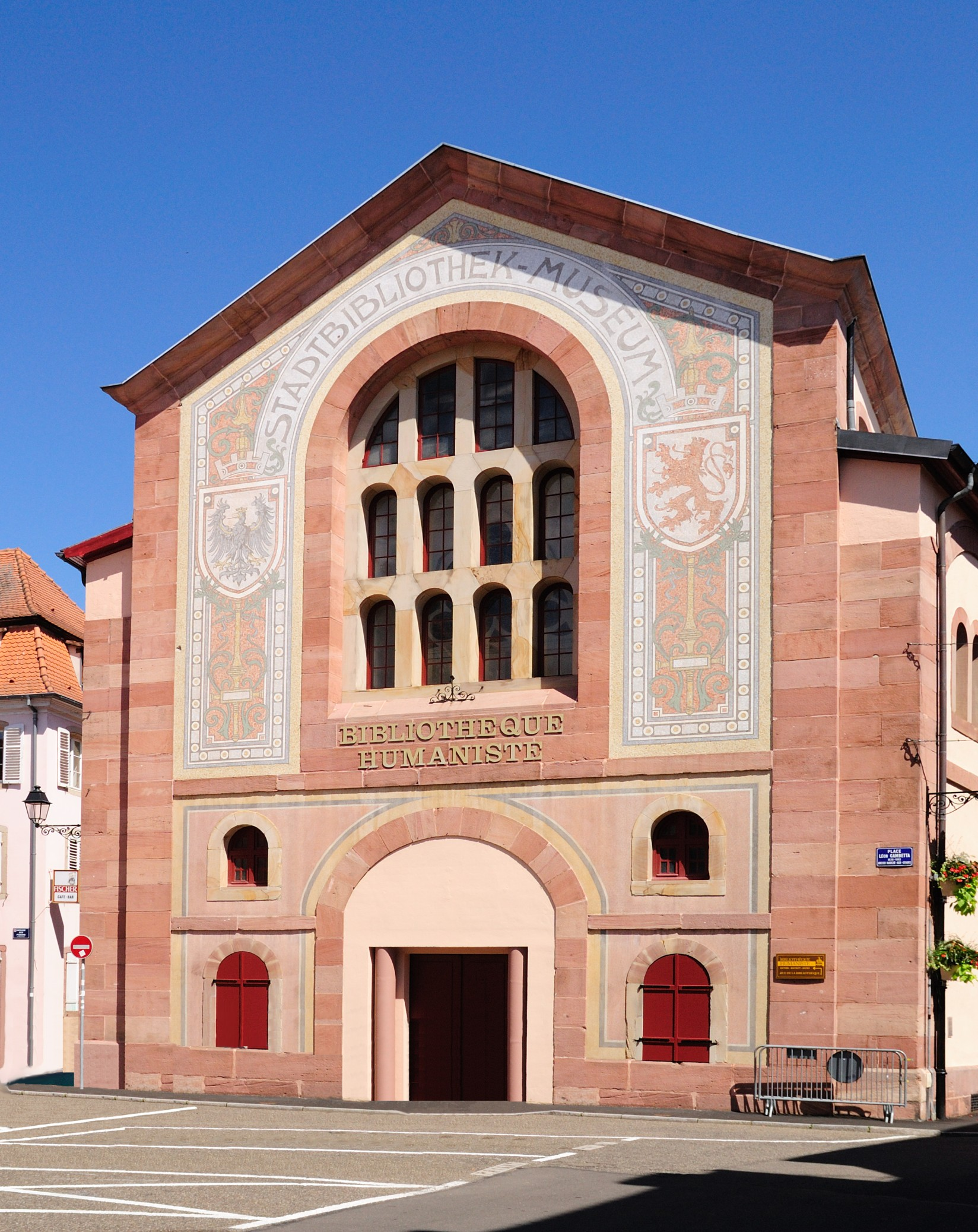
The entrance portal of the library

The Humanist Library in Sélestat is one of the most important cultural treasures of Alsace, France. There are two Renaissance humanist libraries involved, the library of the Humanist School and the private library of the scholar, Beatus Rhenanus (1485–1547). Founded in 1452, it holds 70,000 books.

== The Library of the Humanist School ==
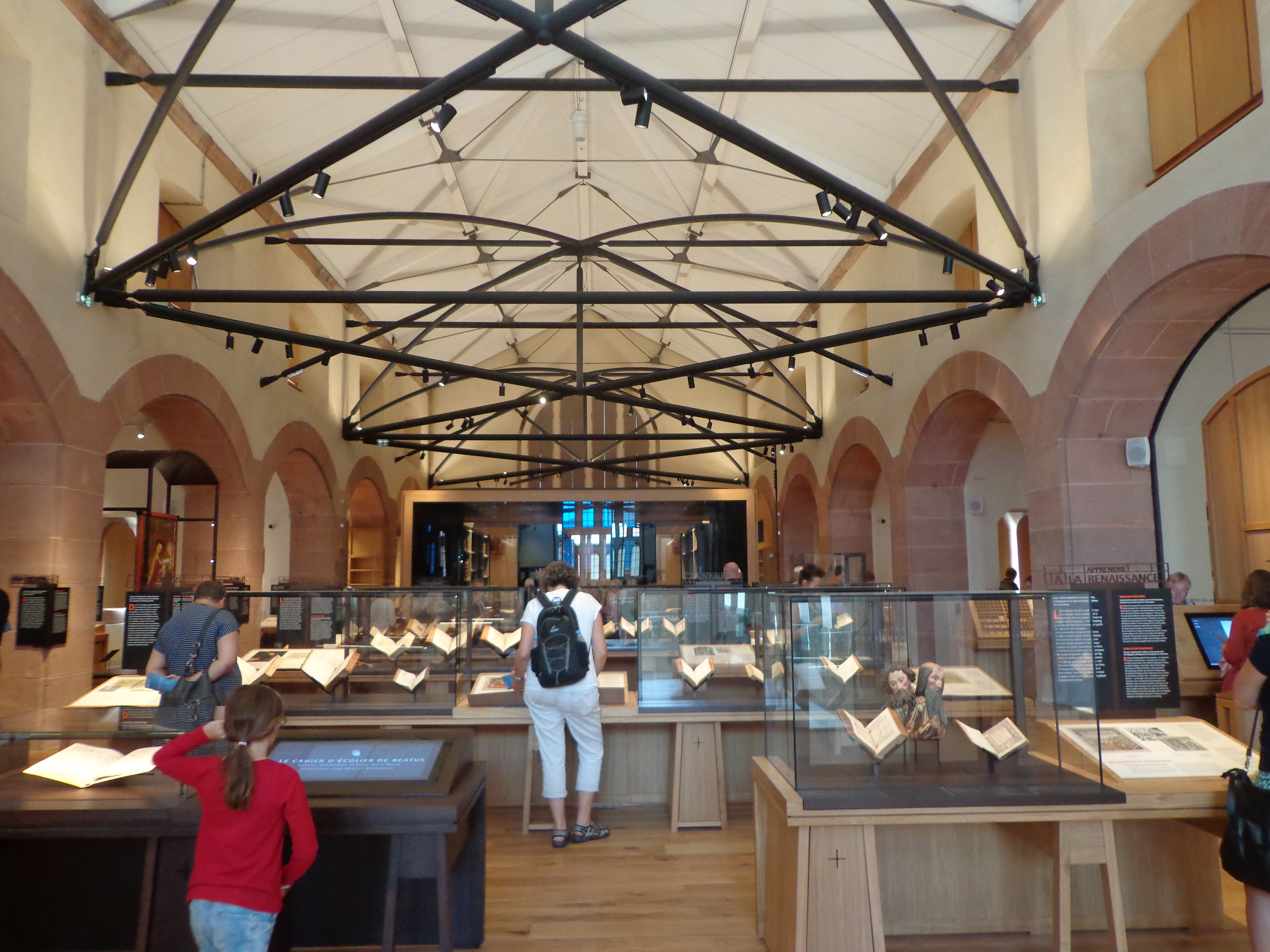
Main reading room after the renovation by Rudy Ricciotti (2018)

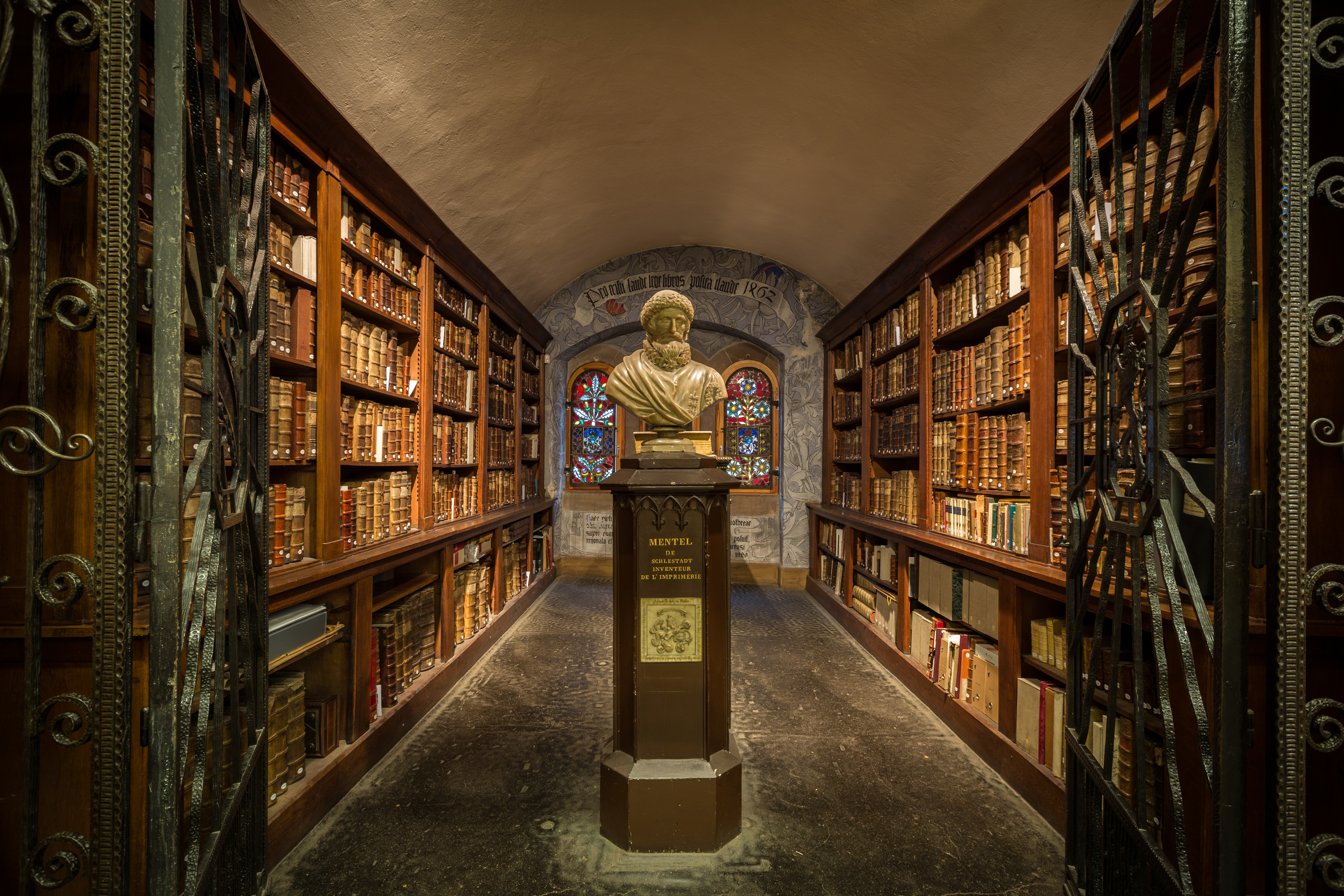
Library of Beatus Rhenanus with a bust of Johannes Mentelin

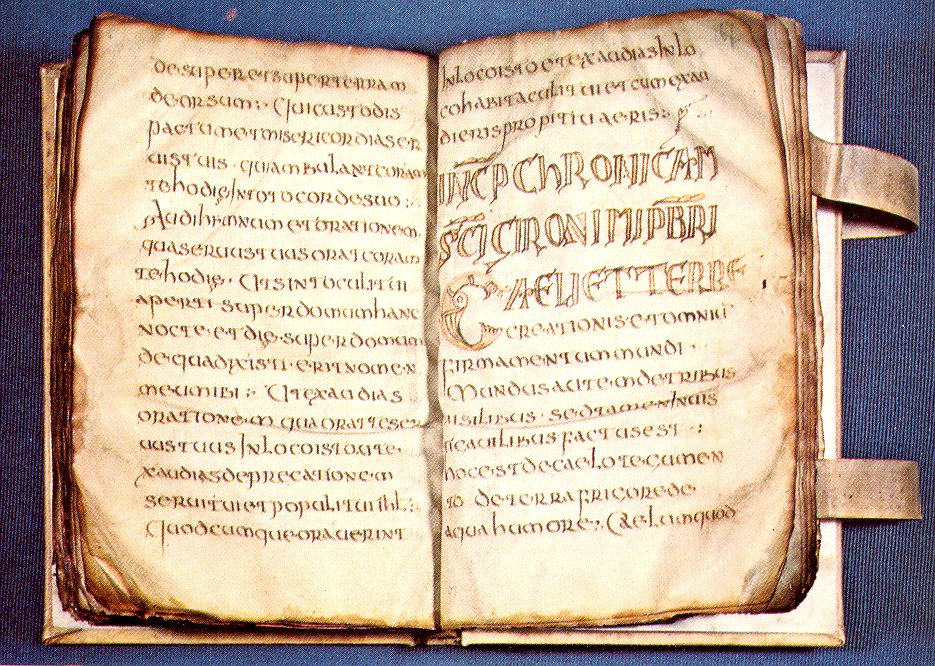
The oldest book in the library, a Merovingian manuscript from the 7th century

In 1441, the municipal authorities of Sélestat – then a free city of the Holy Roman Empire – appointed Ludwig Dringenberg, born in Westphalia, to be the leader of the local Latin school. Under his leadership the school fostered Humanist thinking. His successors. Were Kraft Hofman (1477–1501), Hieronymus Gebwiler (1501–1509) and Hans Sapidus (1510–1525). The school also had a library.

=== Notable alumni ===
- Bonifacius Amerbach
- Beatus Rhenanus

== The Library of Beatus Rhenanus ==
Beatus Rhenanus bequeathed his entire private library to his home city of Sélestat. This library contained about 670 bound leather volumes at the time of his death in 1547, which Rhenanus had collected during his studies and his work in Strasbourg, Basel, Paris and Sélestat. Even at that time, the library was of inestimable value, since books were only published in small numbers of copies and they were extremely expensive. The library of Beatus Rhenanus is the only larger Humanist library preserved virtually intact. Other large libraries, such as those of Erasmus von Rotterdam or Johann Reuchlin, were scattered after the deaths of their owners.

The Library of Beatus Rhenanus was inscribed in the UNESCO's Memory of the World International Register in 2011.

== The Humanists of Sélestat ==
The Alsatian Humanists closely associated with the expansion of the library include:

- Jakob Wimpfeling (1450–1528), theologian, historian and educator
- Martin Butzer (1491–1551), theologian, the "Alsatian Reformer"
- Jakob Spiegel (1483–1547), jurist, advisor to Emperor Charles V
- Hieronymus Gebwiler (1473–1545), vice-chancellor of the school
- Hans Sapidus (1490–1561), vice-chancellor of the school
- Jakob Taurellus (1524–1579), advisor to Emperor Ferdinand I

== The Library today ==
Since 1889, both libraries have been housed in the same building in a former covered market near the Gothic church of Saint George. The library is publicly accessible as a museum and the books can be consulted by scholars and researchers. The collection has as many as 550 incunabula, 460 ancient and modern manuscripts, 2,200 16th century prints, 1,600 17th century prints and 2,600 18th century prints, including the Sélestat Lectionary. The rooms also display a collection of 15th and 16th century Upper-Rhenish religious paintings and sculpture.

== See also ==
- List of libraries in France
