= Gundohinus Gospels =

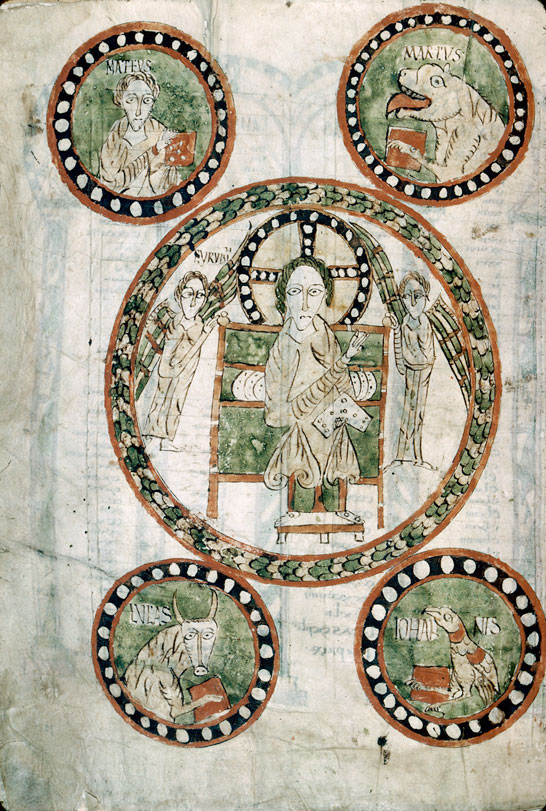
Maiestas Domini (Christ in glory)

The Gundohinus Gospels is an illuminated Gospel Book of 754–755 named after its scribe Gundohinus. It contains one of the earliest figures in a Frankish manuscript and is now in the town library in Autun. It is often held as an example of the new Frankish-papal alliance's opposition to Byzantine iconoclasm.

== Text ==
Its colophon on folio 186 gives Gundohinus' name and states he was working at a scriptorium in Vosevio or Vosevium. It also shows it was completed in the third year of Pepin the Short (c. 754–755) for Fausta (a woman in Pepin's court) and Fuculphus (a monk of a monastery of Saint Mary and Saint John).

The location of Vosevio Abbey has never been decisively proven. Some identify it with Luxeuil Abbey, previously known as Vosges or Vosego. Others believe it was near Laon and that the monastery of saint Mary and saint John was a former monastery in Laon founded around 650 according to another text by one Salberga, sister of a Gundohinus and a Fuculph. Others locate it in Burgundy near Autun.

Gundohinus was neither a trained artist nor accomplished in the writing of a formal uncial script – he labels himself "inexpert" – the miniatures are derived from an early Christian model. Within this medieval artifact there are a variety of artistic illustrations / depictions that are related to the Four Gospels, including decorated initials, Roman influenced pillars surrounding canon tables, a Maiestas Domini illustration, and four Evangelists portraits.

== Artwork ==
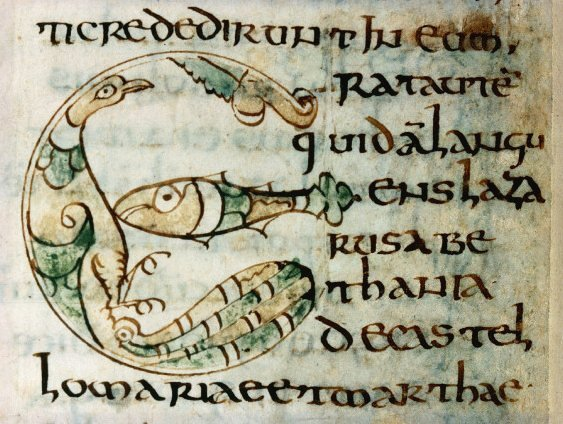
Example of decorated script from Gundohinus Gospels

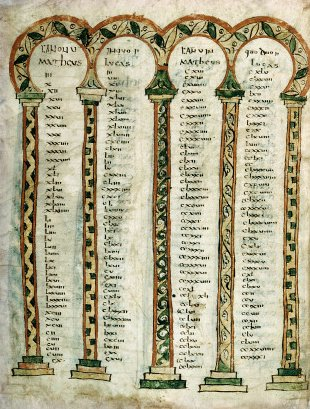
Canon Tables of Gundohinus Gospels

Luke and his symbol, the ox

=== Maiestas Domini illustration ===
Contained within the Gundohinus Gospels is a miniature of the Maiestas Domini. The subject matter of this page has been described as having a larger centered circle or roundel with four smaller circles or medallions located around the center, as if to form a rectangular type of box frame. In the center circle is a depiction of Christ, seated on a throne while holding a book in one hand and offered the sign of peace or blessing with the other. Standing on either side of Christ are angels with one hand each upon the throne of Christ and eyes focused on intently onto him. Within the four corner medallions are four "beasts" that portray representations of the four Evangelists. In the upper left corner is the Man of Matthew, the upper right corner being the Lion of Mark, the lower left corner depicts the Bull of Luke, while the lower right corner symbolizes the Eagle of John.

=== Decorated initials ===
Throughout the Gundohinus Gospels, there are a number of decorated initials that appear either as capital letters or as majuscule script, and are largely composed of animals or beast-like creatures that are used to create the lines or curvature of the letter being illustrated. One example of this style (shown to the left) is through the use of a bird to indicate the side of the letter "C". It is thought that this style has its origination with Roman scriptoria and can be seen in other 8th-Century Merovingian manuscripts.

=== Canon tables ===
The Gundohinus Gospels contains twelve pages of canon tables which were meant to be used to determine which religious passages were shared within which of the Four Gospels. The canon tables (shown to the right) are framed with Roman style pillars or columns with four concentric arches - one over each of the four gospels. The open spaces of the arches are filled with illustrations of leaves and vines, while the columns themselves contain repetitive designs flowing vertically of either geometric shapes or curved scroll like artistry. Unlike the decorated initials previously noted, it does not appear that the use of animals or beasts appear anywhere on the framework surrounding the gospels nor within the script of the gospel citations themselves.

=== Portraits of the Four Evangelists ===
Relevant to the gospels contained within, the Gundohinus Gospels also contains depictions of the four Evangelists; Matthew, Mark, Luke, and John. The last four pages (f.186-188) portray these evangelists contained in architectural roundels similar to those in the St Augustine Gospels and Stockholm Codex, although Nees places them apart from the insular tradition, speculating that they were instead derived from a Ravenna manuscript. Noteworthy is the fact that of all of the surviving Merovingian types of manuscripts, the Gundohinus Gospels is the only such religious document that provides "full-page" portraits of these evangelists. By depicting the four Evangelists in this manner, it adds to the uniqueness of the Gundohinus Gospels in comparison to other such religious or other manuscripts of the medieval time period. From an iconic figural perspective, though these portraits are part of a work created in the mid-700's CE, their depiction can be compared against that of later era Carolingian empire artistic representations.

== Sources ==
- "Initiale - Manuscrit". initiale.irht.cnrs.fr.
- Maître, Claire; Bondéelle-Souchier, Anne; Institut de Recherche et d'Histoire des Textes (Paris) (2004). Catalogue des manuscrits d'Autun: Bibliothèque Municipale et Société Eduenne. Turnhout: Brepols. ISBN 978-2-503-51708-7.
- Nees, Lawrence (1987). The Gundohinus Gospels. Cambridge, Massachusetts: Medieval Academy of America. hdl:2027/heb.31138. ISBN 9780910956932.
- Nees, Lawrence (2002). Early Medieval Art. Oxford University Press. pp. 150–. ISBN 978-0-19-284243-5.
- Bibliothèque nationale (France); Département des manuscrits; Porcher, Jean; Lessing J. Rosenwald Reference Collection (Library of Congress) (1954). Les manuscrits à peintures en France du VIIe au XIIe siècle. Paris.
- Noble, Thomas F. X. (2012). Images, Iconoclasm, and the Carolingians. University of Pennsylvania Press. pp. 139–. ISBN 978-0-8122-0296-0.
- Brown, Michelle P. (1996). The Book of Cerne: Prayer, Patronage, and Power in Ninth-century England. University of Toronto Press. pp. 93–. ISBN 978-0-8020-4113-5.
